= 138th Regiment =

138th Regiment may refer to:

- 138th Infantry Regiment (United States)
- 138th (City of London) Field Regiment, Royal Artillery
- 138th Separate Tank Regiment

== American Civil War regiments ==
- 138th Illinois Infantry Regiment
- 138th Indiana Infantry Regiment
- 138th Ohio Infantry Regiment
- 138th Pennsylvania Infantry Regiment
- 138th United States Colored Infantry Regiment

== See also ==
- 138th Division (disambiguation)
- 138th (disambiguation)
