= McClellan Gate =

- United States
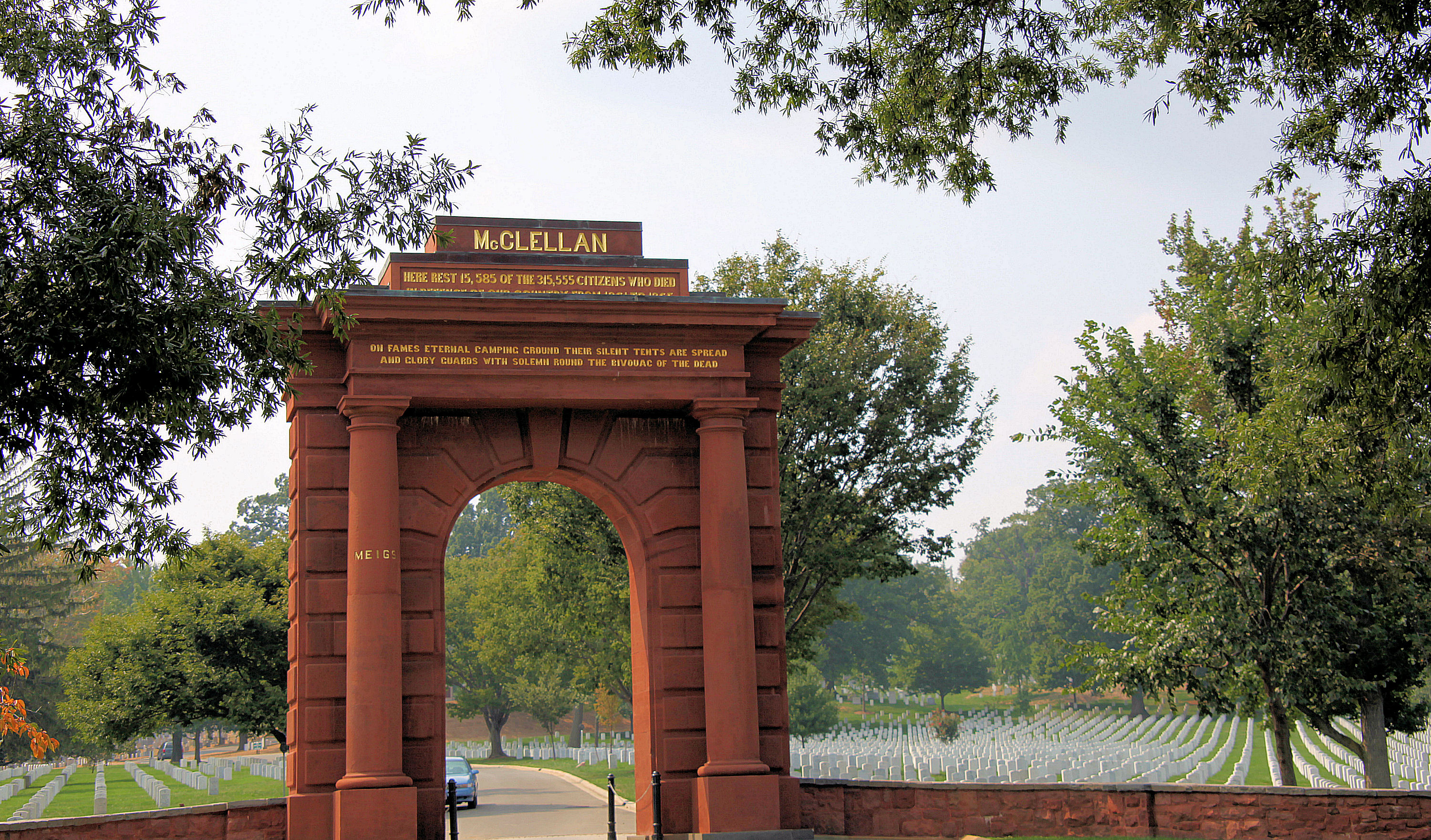
- The McClellan Gate in 2011
- For Major General George B. McClellan, Commander, Army of the Potomac
- Unveiled: c. 1871-1875
- Location: 38.878794°N 77.067150°W near Arlington County, Virginia, U.S.

The McClellan Gate (sometimes known as the McClellan Arch) is a memorial to Major General George B. McClellan located inside Arlington National Cemetery in Arlington County, Virginia, in the United States. Constructed about 1871 on Arlington Ridge Road (then the eastern boundary of the cemetery), it served as a main gate until about 1879 when the Sheridan Gate was constructed. The McClellan Gate became nonfunctional in 1966 when the road closed, and expansion of the cemetery eastward in 1971 left the gate deep inside Arlington. It is the only gate constructed on the cemetery's eastern boundary in the 1800s that survives.

== About the site ==
=== Creating Arlington Estate ===
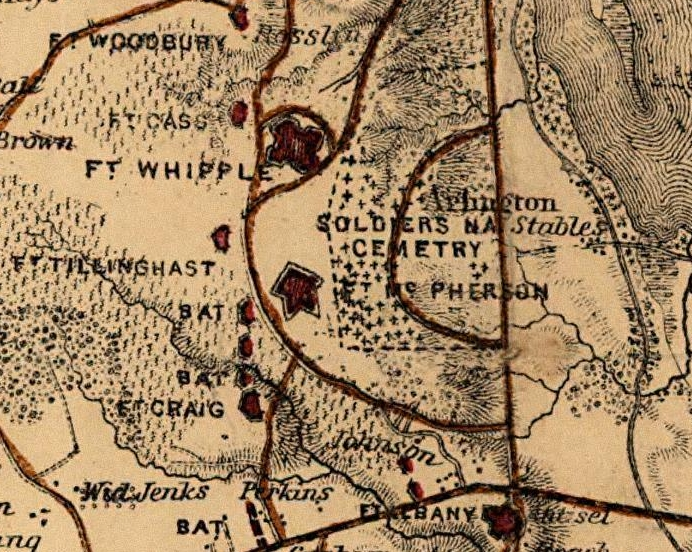
Arlington Estate in 1865, shortly after the creation of Arlington National Cemetery. Arlington Ridge Road runs vertically through the center-right.

In 1778, John Parke Custis purchased an 1,100-acre (4,500,000 m^{2}) tract of forested land on the Potomac River north of the town of Alexandria, Virginia, in 1778. Custis died on November 5, 1781, leaving one-third of his estate to his wife, Eleanor, and a life estate interest in the remaining two-thirds to his step-father, George Washington. After the death of George Washington in 1799 and Martha Washington in 1802, Custis' son, George Washington Parke Custis (known as "G.W.P.") inherited the property. He named his new estate "Mount Washington" after his foster grandfather, and put 57 African slaves to work building log cabins for themselves, clearing land, and farming.

Custis' estate encompassed an area with a highly varied topography. Near the river, the land was flat and lush. But about 1,500 feet (460 m) inland, a ridge ran roughly parallel to the shoreline. Another 300 feet (91 m) or so beyond the ridge, the land rose sharply by nearly 100 feet (30 m) to reach the uplands. "Mount Washington" was too small to be self-supporting as a working farm, so Custis sought to make Arlington into a family seat — complete with a large park, a forest, and gardens. Farming occurred so that G.W.P. could experiment in land management techniques and animal husbandry, and to enhance the diets of his family, farm hands, and slaves. From 1804 to about 1840, Custis worked to create what he called "the Park". Patterned on the English landscape park, "the Park" was bordered by the carriage drive on the south, native forest on the north, uplands and the house on the west, and the ridge in the east.

On July 7, 1804, G.W.P. Custis married Mary Lee Fitzhugh, daughter of one of the wealthiest landowners in northern Virginia. Shortly after their marriage, the Custises began to refer to their estate and home as "Arlington" rather than Mount Washington — an homage to Arlington in the United Kingdom from whence his family emigrated.

=== Creating Arlington Ridge Road ===
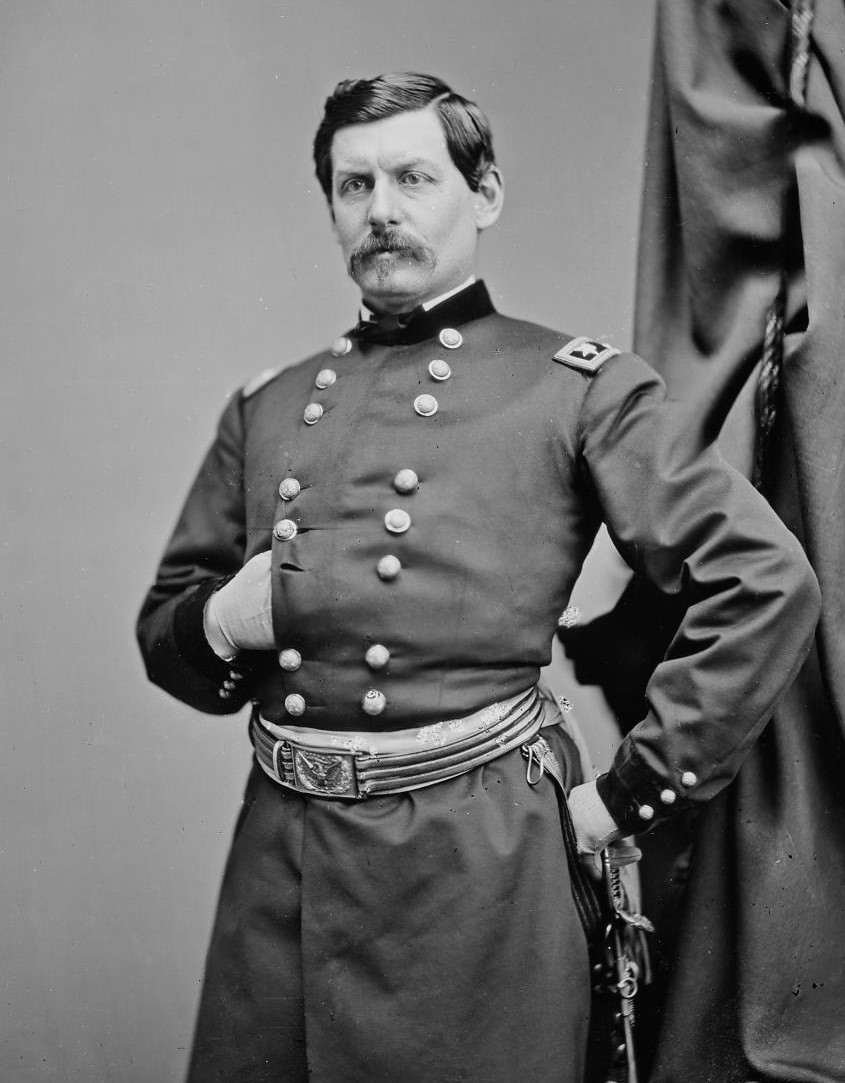
Major General George B. McClellan, for whom the gate is named.

In 1808, the Washington and Alexandria Turnpike was authorized by Congress, and constructed on Custis' land near the river bank. This toll road extended from the Long Bridge (south of the estate) down to Alexandria.

In 1840, Custis agreed to allow a road to be cut across his land. This road was covered in gravel, rather than dirt like the turnpike. It began in the south near the junction of what is now Virginia State Route 27 and the Henry G. Shirley Memorial Highway, and continued in a nearly straight line north-northwest until it reached what is now the intersection of North Fort Myer Drive and U.S. Route 29. For many years, this gravel road was known as Mount Vernon Avenue, but it later became known as Arlington Ridge Road after the great estate through which it passed.

The nature of Arlington Estate changed abruptly in 1861. G.W.P. Custis died on October 10, 1857, leaving the estate to his daughter, Mary. She had married United States Army officer Robert E. Lee on June 30, 1831. At the outbreak of the American Civil War, Robert E. Lee resigned his commission and joined the army of the Confederate States of America. The U.S. Army occupied Arlington on May 24, 1861. The estate served as headquarters for a portion of the regional defenses of Washington, D.C., and the Arlington Line of forts lined the upland: Forts Cass, Craig, DeKalb, Tillinghast, and Woodbury. South of the estate, north of what is now Overlook Park, Fort Albany was built on the side of Arlington Ridge Road. Extensive horse and mule corrals were built east of the road (near the current Visitors Center and parking lots and the area just south of them). In August 1862, Fort Whipple (now known as Fort Myer) was constructed in the northwest part of the estate. Freedmen's Village, a housing development for escaped slaves ("contraband") and free blacks, was constructed in May 1863 the very southern part of the estate immediately west of Arlington Ridge Road. East across Arlington Ridge Road from Freedmen's Village was Hell's Bottom, a 37.5-acre (152,000 m^{2}) site at the foot of the Long Bridge. A horse racing track occupied the bottom.

=== Enclosing Arlington National Cemetery ===
Not all of the Arlington estate was immediately used for burials. Only 200 acres (810,000 m^{2}) were allotted to the cemetery initially. Most burials occurred in what is now Section 13, the "Field of the Dead". By the end of the war in April 1865, more than 16,000 remains were interred at Arlington, surrounding Arlington House on the north, west, and south. Because Arlington National Cemetery was segregated until 1948, more than 4,000 free African Americans, contrabands, and veterans of the United States Colored Troops were buried in the far northeast corner of the cemetery in Section 27. This left roughly 900 acres (3,600,000 m^{2}) land for other purposes. About 400 acres (1,600,000 m^{2}) land was being cultivated by former slaves at Freedmen's Village, who used it for subsistence farming. The remaining 500 acres (2,000,000 m^{2}) was either not in use or was used by the U.S. Army for growing fruits, vegetables, hay, and grain for consumption at nearby Fort Whipple.

In February 1867, Congress passed a national cemeteries bill which required that all military cemeteries be surrounded by a fence. Arlington was already enclosed by a picket fence, painted white. Construction soon began on a fence composed of sandstone taken from Seneca Quarry in Maryland. Five years later, all the Arlington Estate land not encompassed by the cemetery was declared to belong to Fort Whipple (now Fort Myer). Enclosure of Arlington National Cemetery was complete by 1891. (Due to expansion into the area formerly occupied by Freedmen's Village, the fence was enlarged. This enlargement was completed in 1897.)

== Constructing the McClellan Gate ==
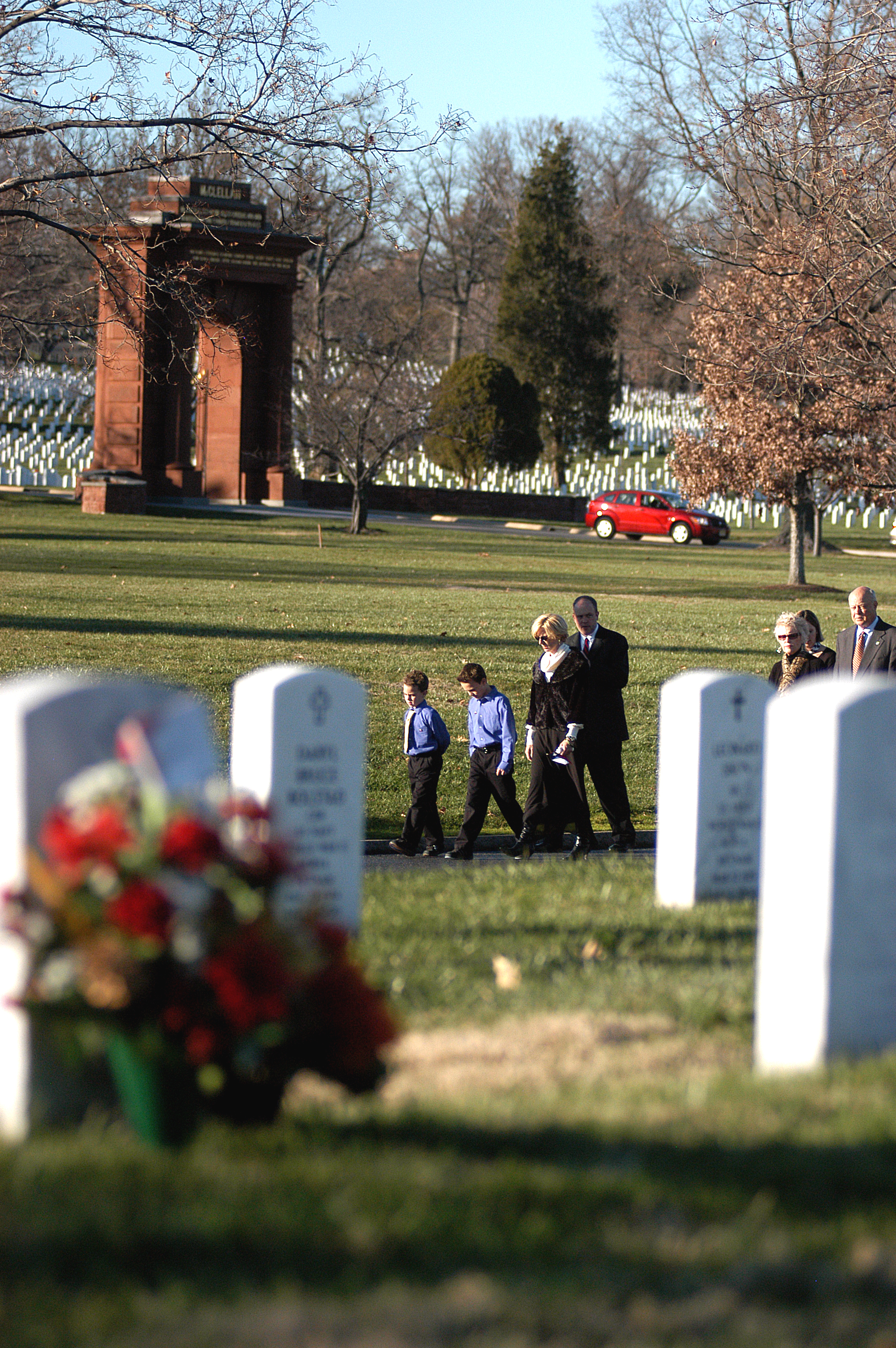
The McClellan Gate, seen from the southeast approximately from the former location of Arlington Ridge Road.

The need to enclose Arlington National Cemetery with a boundary wall naturally led to the decision to create gates to the cemetery. With Fort Whipple to the west and Freedmen's Village to the south, the gates were created on the long eastern boundary which fronted Arlington Ridge Road and on the narrow north boundary.

Four gates were constructed:

- Fort Myer Gate - For military personnel conducting funerals, the main gate was the Fort Myer Gate (later renamed the "Wright Gate" in honor of Orville and Wilbur Wright). This gate was in the west-central boundary wall. A winding road (now called Meigs Avenue) passed between the "Field of the Dead" in Section 13 and the original "officers' section" (Section 1).
- McClellan Gate c. 1871/1872.
- Treasury Gate (also known as the "Meigs Gate") in 1874 or c. 1890/1891.
- Ord-Weitzel Gate - Constructed in 1879, this gate was in the cemetery's eastern boundary wall near the corner with the northern boundary wall, and provided access to a sexton's lodge that served as a receiving vault and kitchen and rest facilities for gravediggers.
- Sheridan Gate - Constructed in 1879.

Brigadier General Montgomery C. Meigs was Quartermaster General of the United States Army, had founded Arlington National Cemetery, and was superintendent over all Army cemeteries until his retirement in February 1882. Meigs personally designed or oversaw the design of most of the early structures at the cemetery (such as the Civil War Unknowns Monument and Old Amphitheater), and in 1871 he ordered a gate constructed in the eastern boundary wall to honor Major General George B. McClellan. When built, the structure was a tribute, not a memorial, to McClellan, for McClellan was still living.

The McClellan Gate was to be constructed of red sandstone from the famed Seneca Quarry in Montgomery County, Maryland. Red brick may also have been used in the interior and foundation of the structure. Wrought iron was used to close the gate. Washington, D.C., sculptor Lot Flannery was hired to sculpt and construct the gate. Just when the gate was completed is a matter of dispute. Although Flannery was hired during fiscal year 1871 (which ran from July 1, 1870, to June 30, 1871), construction proceeded slowly due to delays in obtaining suitable stone, and it was not complete as of December 1871. Historian Rick Atkinson claims the date of the gate's construction was 1870, but this seems improbable. Architectural historian James M. Goode and the Historic American Buildings Survey of the National Park Service claim a date of 1871, but given the date of the United States Secretary of War's report (December 1871) this seems unlikely. Architects Sara A. Butler and Richard Guy Wilson claim the much later date of 1875. The Evening Star newspaper describes the gate as incomplete in May 1872, but fully complete in May 1873.

As the first gate to be built, the McClellan Gate was for several years considered the cemetery's main gate. The Treasury, Sheridan, and Ord-Weitzel gates were all modeled on the McClellan Gate. (All were also constructed of columns salvaged from other important government buildings in Washington, D.C.) After its construction, however, the Sheridan Gate was generally considered to be the cemetery's main entrance. This gate stood adjacent to the intersection of what is now Custis Walk and Schley Drive, and across the street from the Washington, Alexandria, and Mount Vernon Railway streetcar station.

== About the McClellan Gate ==
The 30-foot-high (9.1 m) McClellan Gate is located in Section 33 of Arlington National Cemetery. The main face is to the east.

It is a triumphal arch constructed of red "Seneca sandstone" (named from the Maryland quarry from which it was taken). The interior is in the form of an arch, while the exterior is rectangular with a rusticated facade. On both sides of the arch, a sandstone column with Doric capitals support an entablature. The structure has been described as Victorian in style, although the entablature is Neoclassical.

The upper portion of the cornice of the arch is inscribed with the name "MCCLELLAN" in gilt capital letters. The lower portion of the cornice is inscribed with the following words in gilt letters: "Here Rest 15,585 of the 315,555 Citizens Who Died in the Defense of Our Country From 1861 to 1865". On the south column on the east side is inscribed the name "MEIGS" in capital gilt letters.

=== The O'Hara poem ===
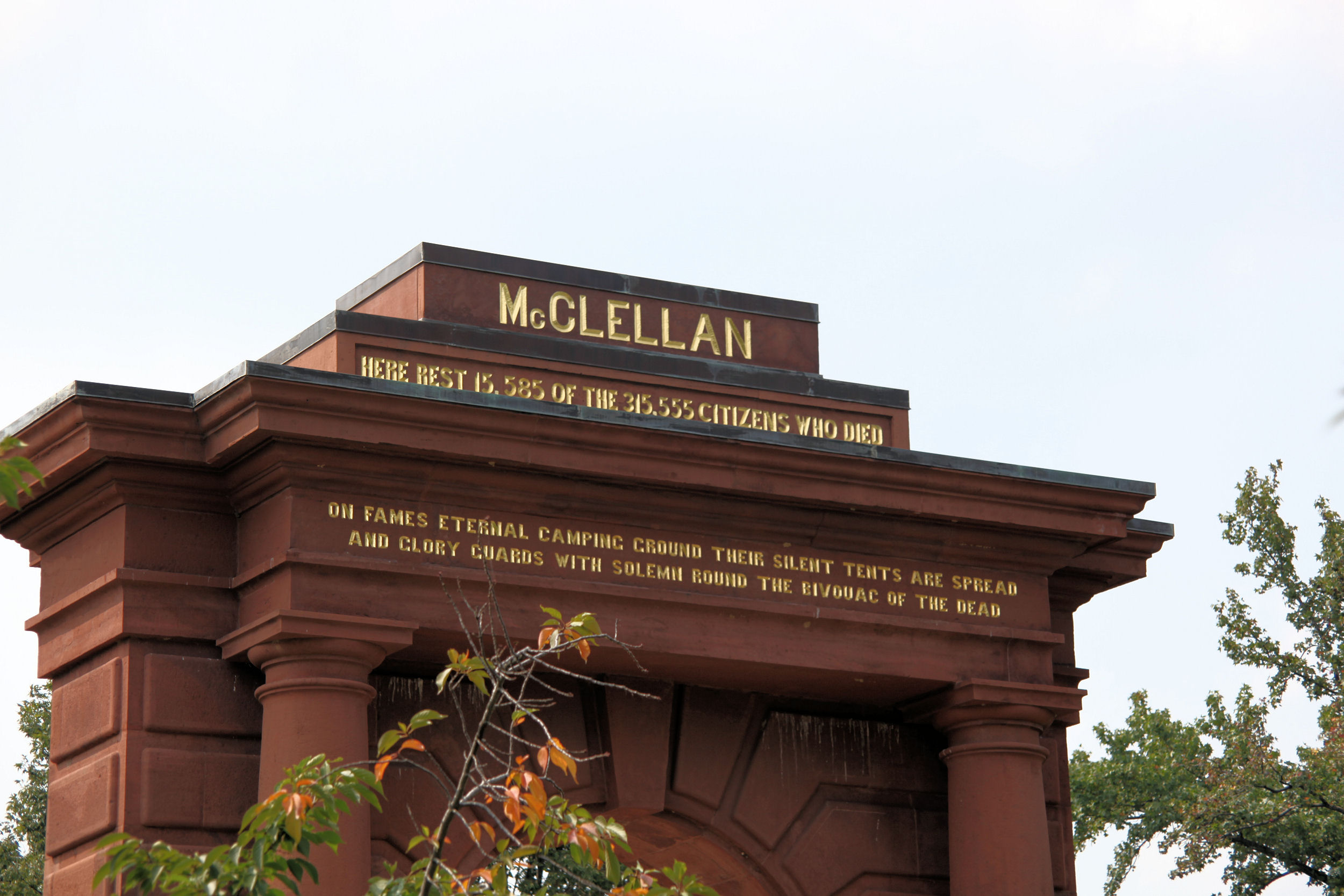
Lines from "Bivouac of the Dead" on the east facade of the McClellan Gate.

Both sides of the McClellan Gate are inscribed with lines from Theodore O'Hara's poem "Bivouac of the Dead". His name, however, is not on the memorial.

A native of Kentucky, O'Hara served in U.S. Army in the Mexican–American War of 1846-1848, and mustered out as a brevet major in October 1848. In 1850, he joined the private army being raised by Narciso López to overthrow the Spanish colonial rule of Cuba. He was wounded in both legs in 1849, and returned home to Frankfort, Kentucky, to recuperate. The state's Veterans Memorial was dedicated in Frankfort on June 25, 1850, and O'Hara spent a great deal of time over the next weeks and months contemplating the memorial. Some time in the latter half of 1850, he composed the poem Bivouac of the Dead as a memorial to those who fought in the Mexican–American War. During the American Civil War, O'Hara fought for the Confederacy in the 12th Regiment Alabama Infantry as a lieutenant colonel. When he died in 1867, his poem had circulated widely throughout the country — usually without credit to its author.

"Bivouac of the Dead" is believed to have been one of Montgomery Meigs' favorite poems. Meigs ordered the lines from the poem be inscribed in gilt letters on the McClellan Gate. On the east side architrave is written: "On Fame's Eternal Camping Ground Their Silent Tents Are Spread and Glory Guards With Solemn Round the Bivouac of the Dead". On the west side architrave is written: "Rest on Embalmed and Sainted Dead, Dear as the Blood Ye Gave; No Impious Footsteps Here Shall Tread on the Herbage of Your Grave".

O'Hara was apparently unaware that his poem was being used to commemorate Civil War dead at Arlington National Cemetery. His family learned of the inscriptions only after the gate became nationally famous in the years after its construction.

== Impact of the McClellan Gate ==
The design of the McClellan Gate was influential. It served as a model for similar gates at Chattanooga National Cemetery, Nashville National Cemetery, and Vicksburg National Cemetery.

Meigs was so impressed with the effect of "Bivouac of the Dead" that he had lines from the poem inscribed on wooden plaques and placed the plaques throughout Arlington National Cemetery. These were replaced with either bronze or iron plaques in 1881. He also had similar plaques placed in Antietam National Cemetery, Fredericksburg National Cemetery, Gettysburg National Cemetery, Vicksburg National Cemetery, and others.

== Functional changes and restoration ==
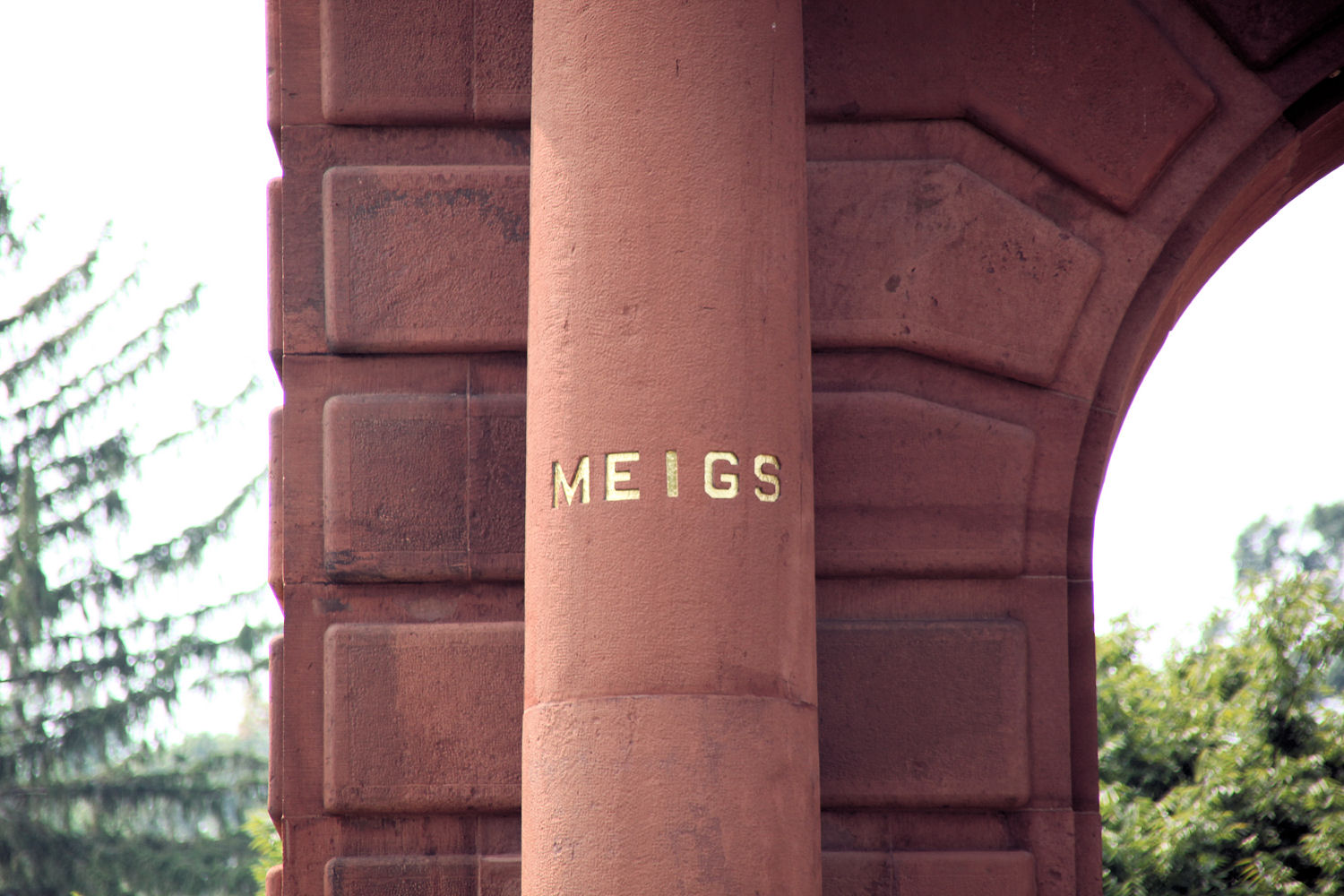
Brig. Gen. Montgomery C. Meigs had his name carved into a pillar on the gate.

The McClellan Gate is the only surviving gate of the original public entrances constructed in the 1800s.

McClellan Gate was rendered obsolete by 1932. Congress authorized construction of the Arlington Memorial Bridge in 1922. As part of the bridge project, Congress also approved a wide avenue known as Memorial Drive to link the bridge to the cemetery, and a new entrance to the cemetery (the "Hemicycle") to replace the old entrance gates. The Hemicycle and Memorial Drive opened in January 1932.

The McClellan Gate continued to provide access to the cemetery until 1971. Arlington Ridge Road continued to be the eastern boundary for the cemetery into the 1960s. But with burial space at Arlington becoming scarce, Congress approved the expansion of the cemetery eastward into the South Post of Fort Myer. The road was closed in October 1966, barring the public from using the McClellan Gate. The cemetery finally expanded eastward in 1971, leaving the McClellan Gate deep inside the cemetery.

For reasons which remain unclear, the McClellan Gate survived. The Ord-Weitzel Gate and Sheridan Gate were both dismantled in 1971, and the east boundary wall demolished. The McClellan Gate, which was not constructed of historic marble or masonry, remained intact.

The McClellan Gate underwent a $660,000 restoration ($1,323,221 in 2024 dollars) in 1996 and 1997. Some stone was reset, some stone replaced, spalls were patched or reattached, mortar was repointed, and structural repairs made. Two companies, Gruber-Latimer Restoration and Samaha Associates, conducted the work. Regilding of the letters was done by Gordon Ponsford, a restorer who also worked on the cemetery's Rough Riders Memorial and Confederate Memorial.

== Bibliography ==
- Aiken, Charles Curry and Kane, Joseph Nathan. The American Counties: Origins of County Names, Dates of Creation, Area, and Population Data, 1950-2010. Lanham, Md.: Scarecrow Press, 2013.
- Annual Report of the Secretary of War for the Year 1891. Part 1. Washington, D.C.: Government Printing Office, 1892.
- Arlington Memorial Bridge Commission. The Arlington Memorial Bridge. Washington, D.C.: Government Printing Office, 1924.
- "Arlington National Cemetery, Ord-Weitzel Gate (North Gateway). Arlington, Virginia." HABS VA-1348-C. Historic American Buildings Survey. National Park Service. U.S. Department of the Interior. 1999.
- "Arlington National Cemetery, Sheridan Gate (Center Gateway). Arlington, Virginia." HABS VA-1348-B. Historic American Buildings Survey. National Park Service. U.S. Department of the Interior. 1999.
- Atkinson, Rick. Where Valor Rests: Arlington National Cemetery. Washington, D.C.: National Geographic Society, 2007.
- Bell, William Gardner. Quarters One: The United States Army Chief of Staff's residence, Fort Myer, Virginia. Washington, D.C.: Center of Military History, U.S. Army, 2001.
- Bigler, Philip. In Honored Glory: Arlington National Cemetery, the Final Post. Arlington, Va.: Vandamere Press, 1999.
- Bryan, Wilhelmus Bogart. A History of the National Capital: From Its Foundation Through the Period of the Adoption of the Organic Act. New York: Macmillan, 1914.
- Butler, Sara A. and Wilson, Richard Guy. Buildings of Virginia: Tidewater and Piedmont. Oxford, U.K.: Oxford University Press, 2002.
- Carroll, James. Crusade: Chronicles of an Unjust War. New York: Henry Holt, 2004.
- Chase, Enoch Aquila. "The Arlington Case: George Washington Custis Lee against the United States of America." Records of the Columbia Historical Society. 31/32: 1930.
- Committee on Appropriations. Sundry Civil Bill, 1919. U.S. House of Representatives. 65th Cong., 2d sess. Washington, D.C.: Government Printing Office, 1918.
- Connery, William S. Civil War: Northern Virginia, 1861. Charleston, S.C.: The History Press, 2011.
- Cultural Landscape Program. Arlington House: The Robert E. Lee Memorial Cultural Landscape Report. National Capital Region. National Park Service. U.S. Department of the Interior. Washington, D.C.: 2001.
- Decker, Karl and McSween, Angus. Historic Arlington. Washington, D.C.: Decker and McSween Publishing Company, 1892.
- Dieterle, Lorraine Jacyno. Arlington Cemetery: A Nation's Story Carved in Stone. San Francisco: Pomegranate, 2001.
- Dodge, George W. Arlington National Cemetery. Charleston, S.C.: Arcadia Publishing, 2006.
- Goode, James M. Capital Losses: A Cultural History of Washington's Destroyed Buildings. Washington, D.C.: Smithsonian Institution Press, 2003.
- Franscell, Ron. The Crime Buff's Guide to Outlaw Washington, D.C. Guilford, Conn.: Globe Pequot, 2012.
- Holt, Dean W. American Military Cemeteries. Jefferson, N.C.: McFarland & Co., 2010.
- Jacob, Kathryn Allamong. "Arlington." In Encyclopedia of the American Civil War: A Political, Social, and Military History. David Stephen Heidler, Jeanne T. Heidler, and David J. Coles, eds. New York: W.W. Norton & Company, 2002.
- Lowther, Minnie Kendall. Mount Vernon, Arlington and Woodlawn. Washington, D.C.: C.H. Potter & Co., 1922.
- Miller, David W. Second Only to Grant: Quartermaster General Montgomery C. Meigs: A Biography. Shippensburg, Pa.: White Mane Books, 2000.
- National Capital Planning Commission. Federal Capital Improvements Program for the National Capital Region. Washington, D.C.: National Capital Planning Commission, 1995.
- National Park Service. Glen Echo Park, George Washington Memorial Parkway, Statement for Management B1: Cultural Resources Management Plan: Environmental Impact Statement. Washington, D.C.: U.S. Government Printing Office, 1982.
- Netherton, Nan and Netherton, Ross De Witt. Arlington County in Virginia: A Pictorial History. Norfolk, Va.: Donning Co., 1987.
- Pepper, Melville. Every-Day Life in Washington. New York: The Christian Herald, 1900.
- Peters, James Edward. Arlington National Cemetery, Shrine to America's Heroes. Bethesda, Md.: Woodbine House, 2000.
- Poole, Robert M. On Hallowed Ground: The Story of Arlington National Cemetery. New York: Walker & Co., 2009.
- Ramage, James A. and Watkins, Andrea A. Kentucky Rising: Democracy, Slavery, and Culture From the Early Republic to the Civil War. Lexington, Ky.: University Press of Kentucky, 2011.
- Report of the Secretary of War, Being Part of the Message and Documents Communicated to the Two Houses of Congress at the Beginning of the Second Session of the Forty-Second Congress. Volume 1. Executive Document 1, Part 2. Washington, D.C.: Government Printing Office, 1871.
- Reynolds, Charles Bingham. Washington Standard Guide. New York: Foster & Reynolds, 1903.
- Rose, Cornelia Bruère. Arlington County, Virginia: A History. Arlington County, Va.: Arlington Historical Society, 1976.
- Subcommittee on VA-HUD-Independent Agencies. Departments of Veterans Affairs and Housing and Urban Development and Independent Agencies Appropriations for Fiscal Year 1998: Hearings on H.R. 2158/S. 1034. Committee on Appropriations. U.S. Senate. 105th Cong., 1st sess. Washington, D.C.: U.S. Government Printing Office, 1998.
- Templeman, Eleanor Lee Reading. Arlington Heritage: Vignettes of a Virginia County. Arlington, Va.:Eleanor Lee Reading Templeman, 1959.
