= 35th New York Infantry Regiment =

- Active: June 11th, 1861 to June 5, 1863
- Country: United States
- Allegiance: Union
- Branch: Infantry
- Nickname: "Jefferson County Regiment"
- Engagements: American Civil War: First Battle of Rappahannock Station; Second Battle of Bull Run; Battle of Chantilly; Battle of South Mountain; Battle of Antietam; Battle of Fredericksburg; Battle of Chancellorsville

Commanders
- Colonel: John G. Todd

Insignia
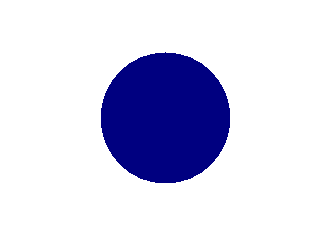
- 3rd Division, I Corps

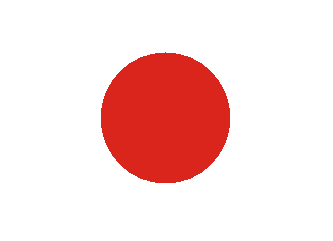
- 1st Division, I Corps

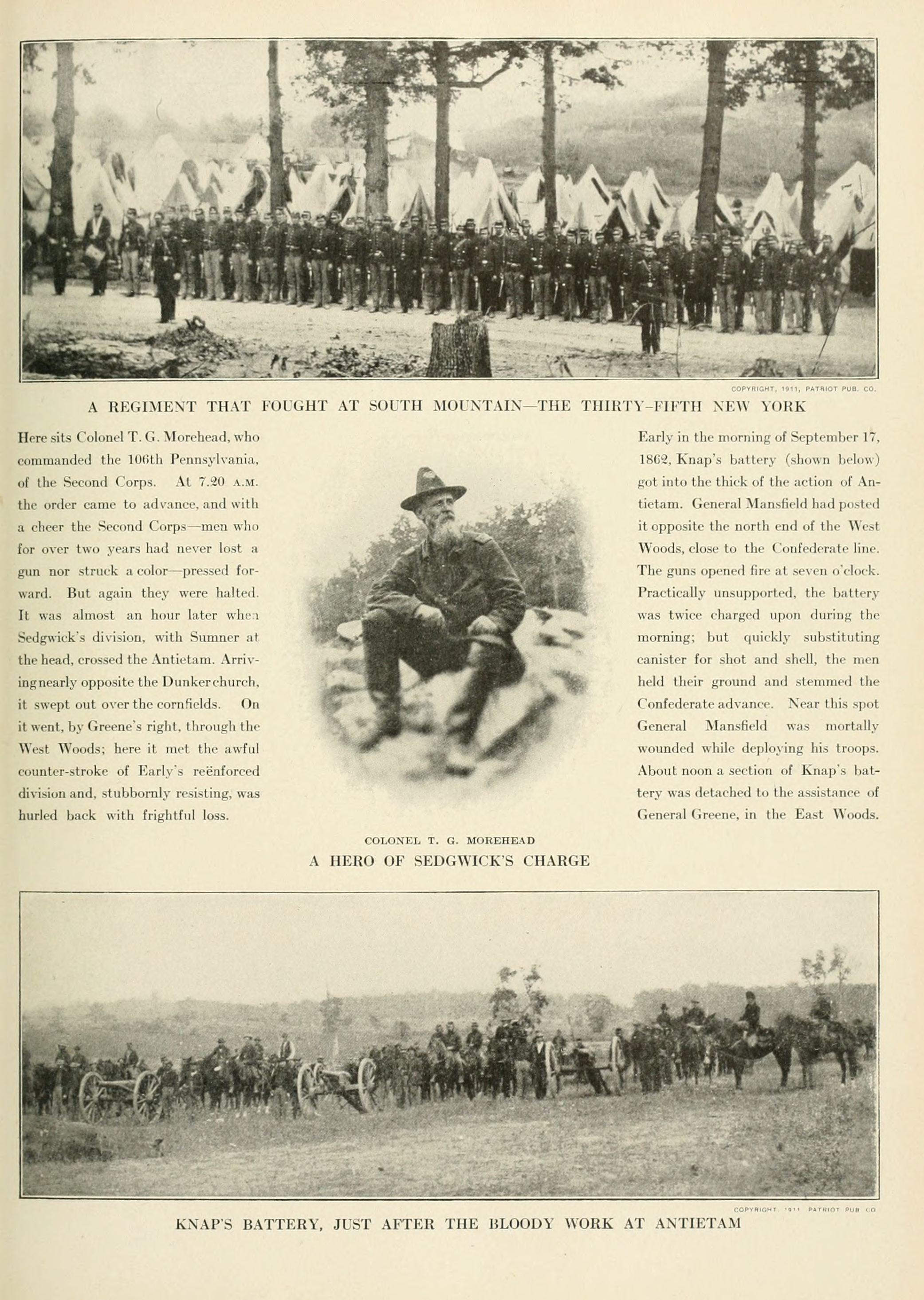
35th New York lined up in a camp, 1862.

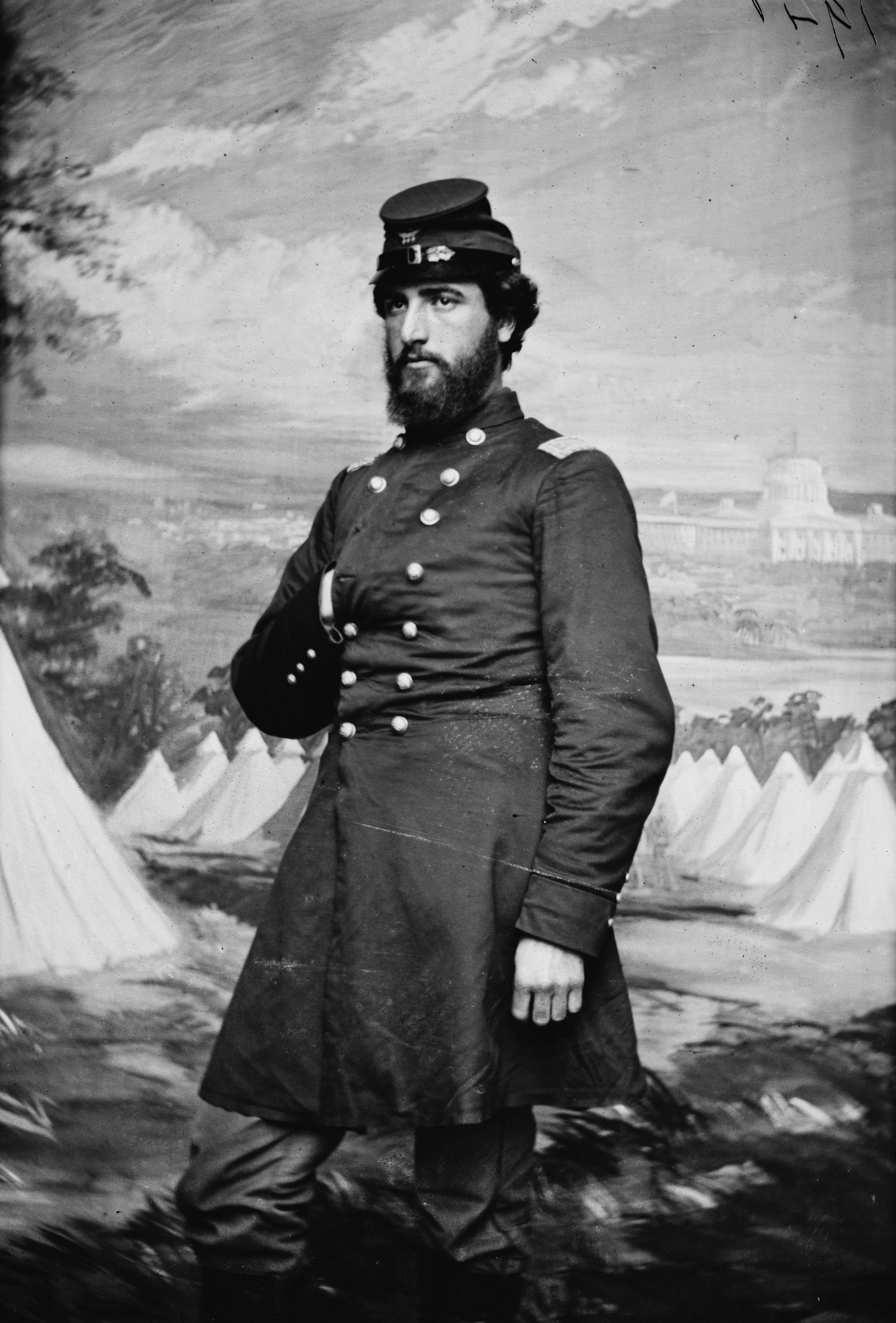
Col. John G. Todd, 35th New York Volunteer Infantry

The 35th New York Infantry Regiment, the "Jefferson County Regiment", was an infantry regiment of the Union Army during the American Civil War.

== Service ==
This regiment was accepted by the State May 25, 1861; organized at Elmira, and there mustered in the service of the United States for two years June 11, 1861. On June 5, 1863 the regiment was mustered out and the men of the regiment were transferred to the 80th New York Volunteer Infantry Regiment.

The regiment left the State July 9, 1861; served at and near Washington, D. C., from July, 1861; in Porter's Brigade, Army of Northeastern Virginia, from July, 1861; in Hunter's Brigade, Division of Potomac, from August, 1861; in Wadsworth's Brigade, Irvin McDowell's Division, Army of the Potomac, from October, 1861; in 2d, Patrick's, Brigade, 3d, King's, Division, 1st Corps, Army of the Potomac, from March, 1862; in 2d Brigade, King's Division, Department of Rappahannock, from May, 1862; in 3d Brigade, 1st Division, 3d Corps, Army of Virginia, from June, 1862; in same brigade and division, 1st Corps, Army of the Potomac, from September, 1862; in the Provost Guard Brigade, Army of the Potomac, from January, 1863; at Aquia Creek from April, 1863; and was honorably discharged and mustered out June 5, 1863, at Elmira.

The companies were recruited principally:

- A and E at Watertown;
- B (Jefferson Grays) at Copenhagen;
- C at Theresa;
- D at New York City, Buffalo and Elmira;
- F at Corning and Hammondsport;
- G at Adams;
- H at Cazenovia;
- I at Redwood, and
- K at Brownville.

The 35th camped on Meridian Hill; moved to Arlington House and was engaged for a time in construction work on Fort Tillinghast and Fort Craig, and moved to Falls Church, Virginia, where it passed the winter of 1861-62. In March, 1862, camp was broken for the Manassas movement and in April the 35th proceeded to Falmouth, Virginia. During the latter part of August, the regiment was in action at Rappahannock Station, Sulphur Springs, Gainesville, and participated in the second battle of Bull Run. It was present at Chantilly, but not closely engaged and then returned to Falls Church. At South Mountain the command lost 13 in killed, wounded and missing, and at Antietam the loss was 67. Until October, the regiment encamped at Sharpsburg, Maryland, then moved to Brooks' station, and was held in reserve at Fredericksburg, Virginia until the day of the battle, when the loss was 23 killed, wounded and missing. In January, 1863, the regiment was assigned to the provost guard brigade, which was stationed at Falmouth, and also performed guard duty along the Aquia Creek railroad. In May, the regiment left Aquia Creek for Elmira.

== Total strength and casualties ==
The total enrollment of the regiment was 1,250. During its service the regiment lost by death, killed in action, 1 officer, 25 enlisted men; of wounds received in action, 18 enlisted men; of disease and other causes, 56 enlisted men; total, 1 officer, 99 enlisted men; aggregate, 100; of whom 5 enlisted men died in the hands of the enemy.

== Commanders ==
- Colonel William C. Brown
- Colonel Newton B. Lord
- Colonel John G. Todd

== See also ==
- List of New York Civil War regiments
