= 138 =

138 may refer to:

- 138 (number), the natural number following 137 and preceding 139
- 138 BC
- AD 138
- 138 (New Jersey bus)
- 138 Tolosa, a main-belt asteroid
- Tatra 138, a heavy truck

== See also ==
- 138th (disambiguation)
