= Fort Woodbury =

Former Civil War fort in Arlington, Virginia

- Part of the Civil War defenses of Washington, D.C.
- Court House, Arlington County, Virginia
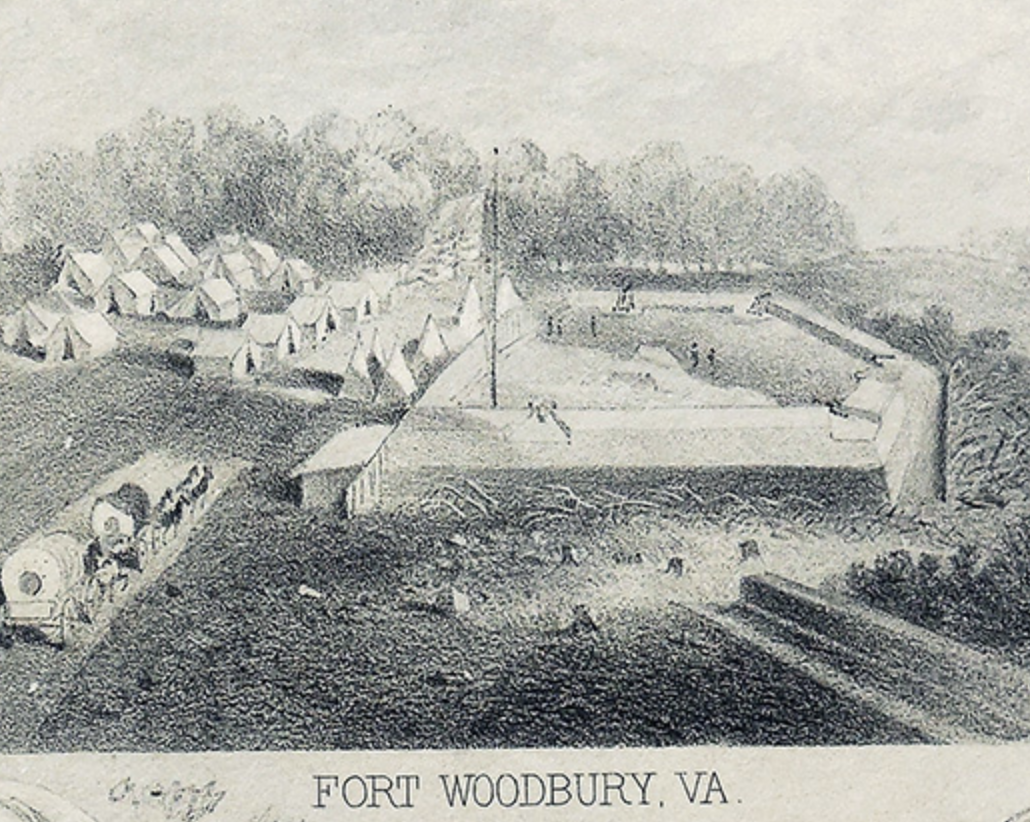
- Lithographic print of Fort Woodbury by Lieutenant Charles Ferdinand Gruner of 4th Michigan Infantry

Site information
- Type: Lunette
- Controlled by: Union Army
- Condition: No visible remnants

Site history
- Built: 1861
- Built by: U.S. Army Corps of Engineers
- In use: 1861–1865
- Materials: Earth, timber
- Demolished: 1865
- Battles/wars: American Civil War

Fort Woodbury was a lunette fortification built in 1861 by the 4th Michigan Infantry Regiment during the early American Civil War. It was part of the larger Arlington Line, an extensive network of fortifications erected in present-day Arlington County, Virginia, designed to protect Washington, D.C., from Confederate attack. Like the other three lunettes in the Arlington Line, Fort Woodbury occupied the highlands in Arlington that had a direct line of sight towards Washington.

Fort Woodbury did not experience any action throughout the course of the Civil War and was abandoned after the war's end in 1865. The site of the fort was eventually chosen for Arlington County's courthouse in 1898 and is today part of the Court House neighborhood, where it is marked with a commemorative sign.

== Background ==
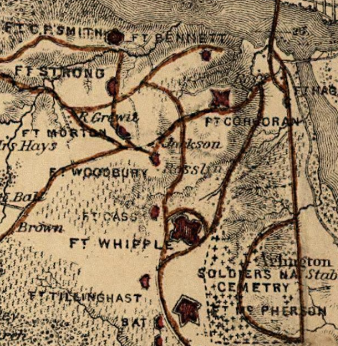
Fort Woodbury and adjacent defenses

Following the occupation of Alexandria County by the Union on May 24, 1861, work immediately began on the construction of fortifications to defend Washington from any Confederate incursions. By July, these defenses had secured the bridgehead at the Aqueduct Bridge between Rosslyn and Georgetown. The Confederate victory at the First Battle of Bull Run on July 21, 1861 further necessitated the expansion of fortifications, particularly in the hills of Arlington Heights surrounding Robert E. Lee's Arlington plantation that provided a direct line of sight towards Washington. This became the Arlington Line, a system of 33 forts that protected the capital and Alexandria from attack. The Arlington Line included the four earthen lunettes of Forts Cass, Craig, Tillinghast, and Woodbury. Colonel B. S. Alexander and Major D. P. Woodbury were charged with the design and engineering of all the lunettes.

== Construction ==
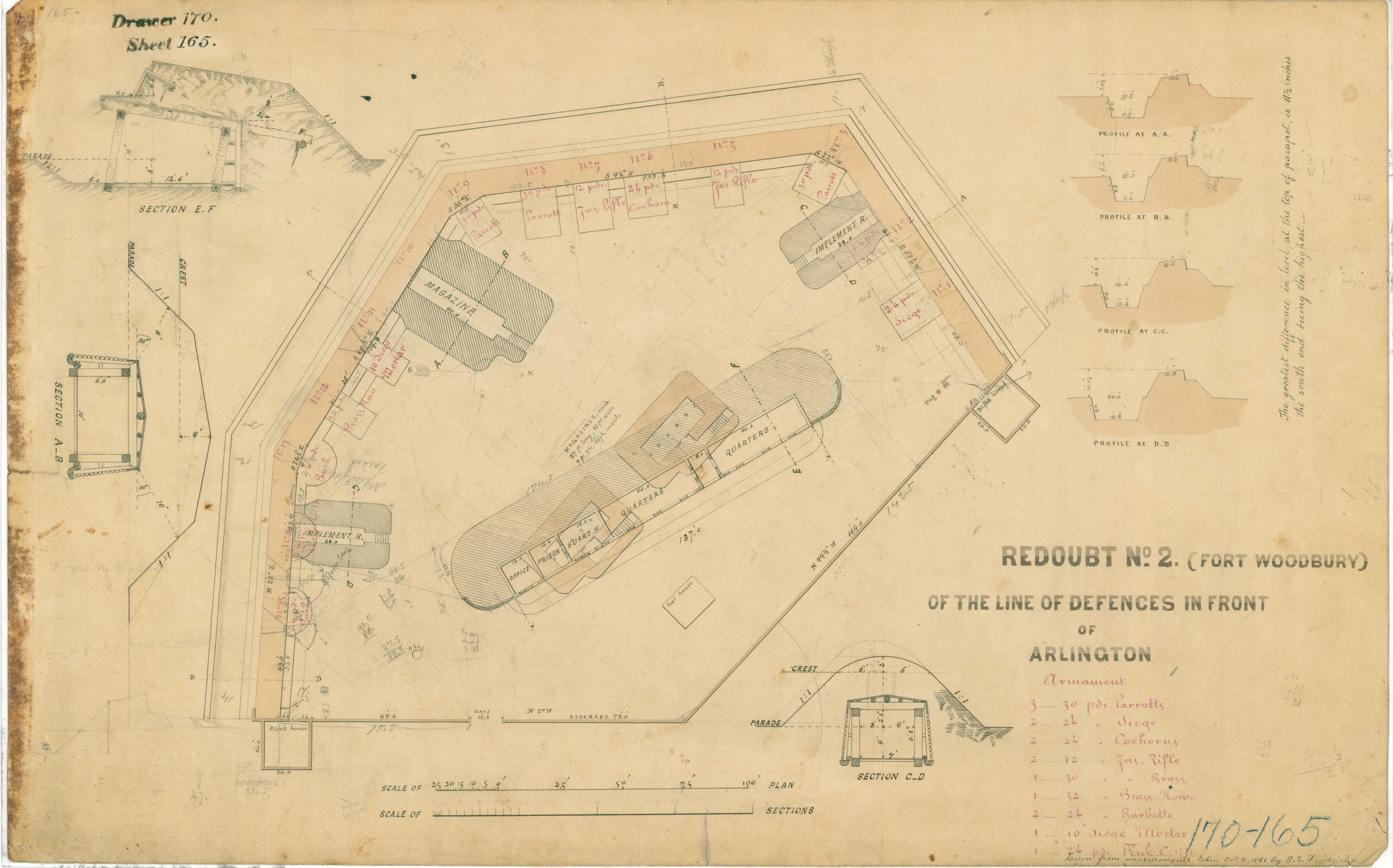
Plan of Fort Woodbury outlining its design, parameters, and armament

Fort Woodbury was constructed in August 1861 by the 4th Michigan Infantry Regiment, who were commanded by Colonel Dwight A. Woodbury (no relation to D. P.). The fort was either named for D. P. Woodbury or Dwight A. Woodbury. Located on a hill, Fort Woodbury had a 275-yard parameter with placements for up to 13 guns, 2 magazines, a barracks, and an abatis. Its armament consisted of five 24-pounder guns, three 30-pound Parrott rifles, four 6-pounder guns, and one 24-pound Coehorn mortar. Trees in the forested area surrounding the fort were widely slashed, and half-sunk field gun placements were positioned in between each lunette. The lunettes collectively formed a defensive line on Arlington's high ground between Forts Richardson and Albany to the south, and the shore of the Potomac opposite Georgetown to the north.

== Garrisons ==
The following regiments were garrisoned at Fort Woodbury between 1861 and 1865:

- 1st Massachusetts Heavy Artillery Regiment
- 4th Michigan Infantry Regiment
- 88th Pennsylvania Infantry Regiment
- 4th New York Heavy Artillery Regiment
- 16th Maine Infantry Regiment
- 128th Pennsylvania Infantry Regiment
- 2nd New York Infantry Regiment
- 1st Maryland Light Artillery
- 164th Ohio National Guard
- 145th Ohio National Guard
- 1st New York Light Artillery Battalion
- 2nd New York Heavy Artillery Regiment

Like the rest of the Arlington Line, Fort Woodbury never saw any major engagements. It was abandoned after the war's end.

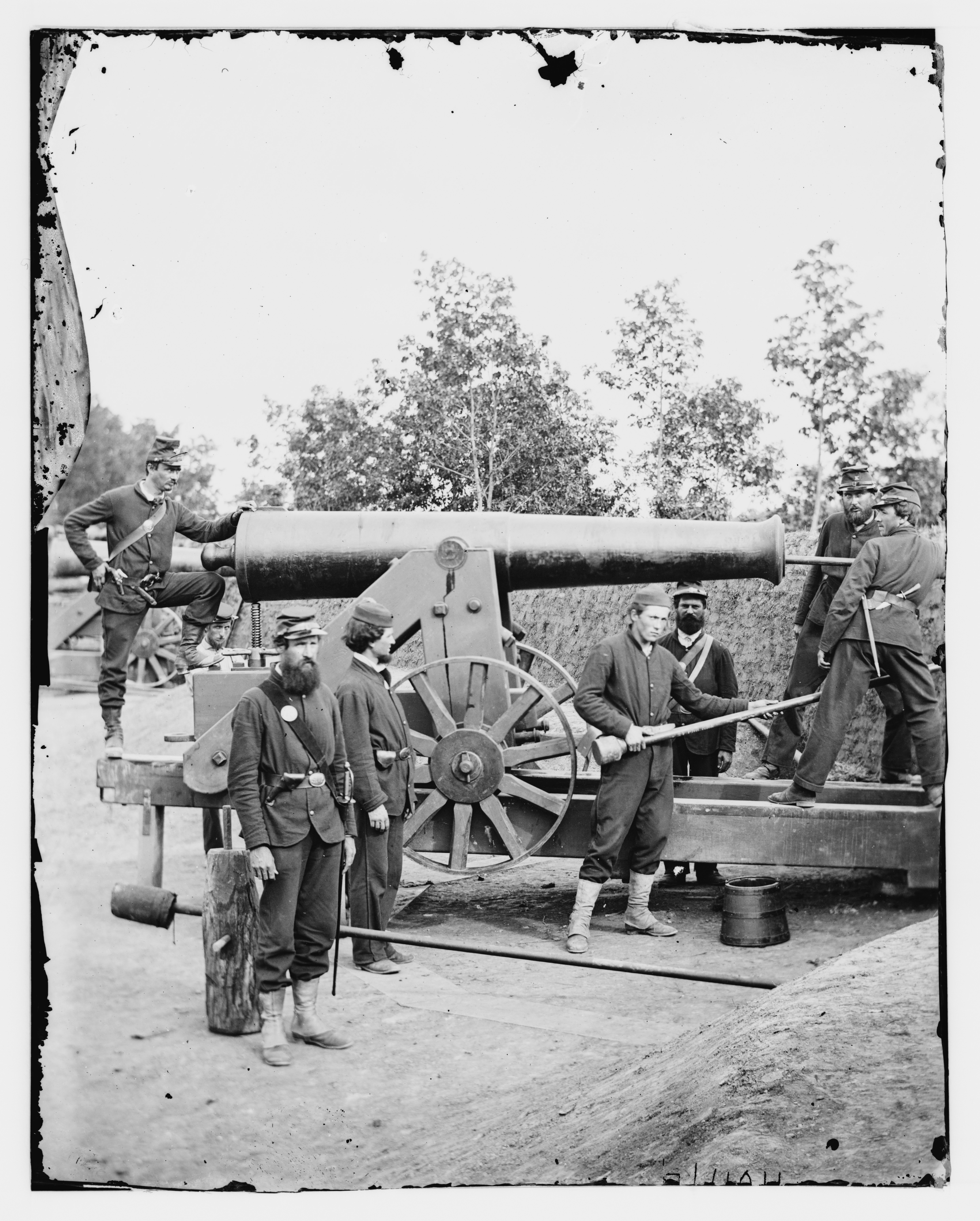
Soldiers with mounted gun at Fort Woodbury by Mathew Brady, ca. 1861

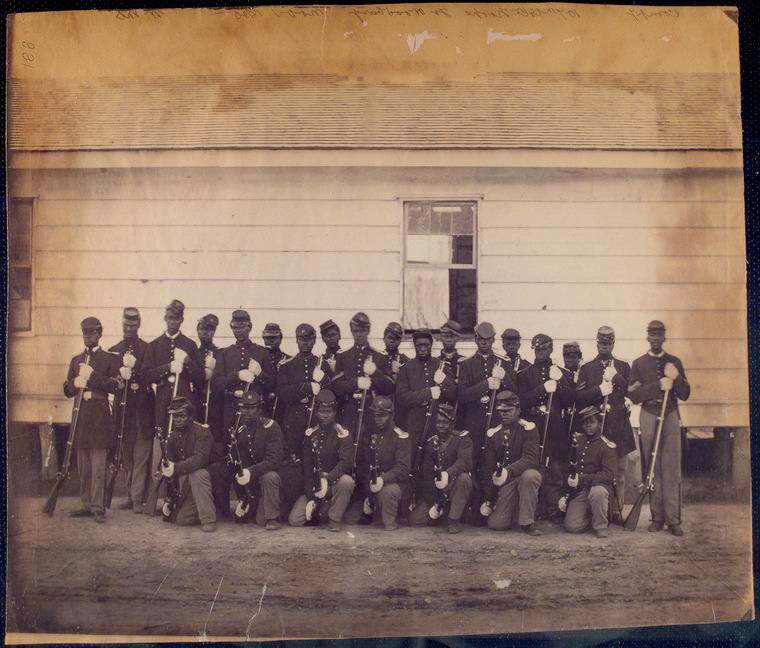
The 107th Regiment of the United States Colored Troops at Fort Woodbury by Alexander Gardner, November 1, 1865

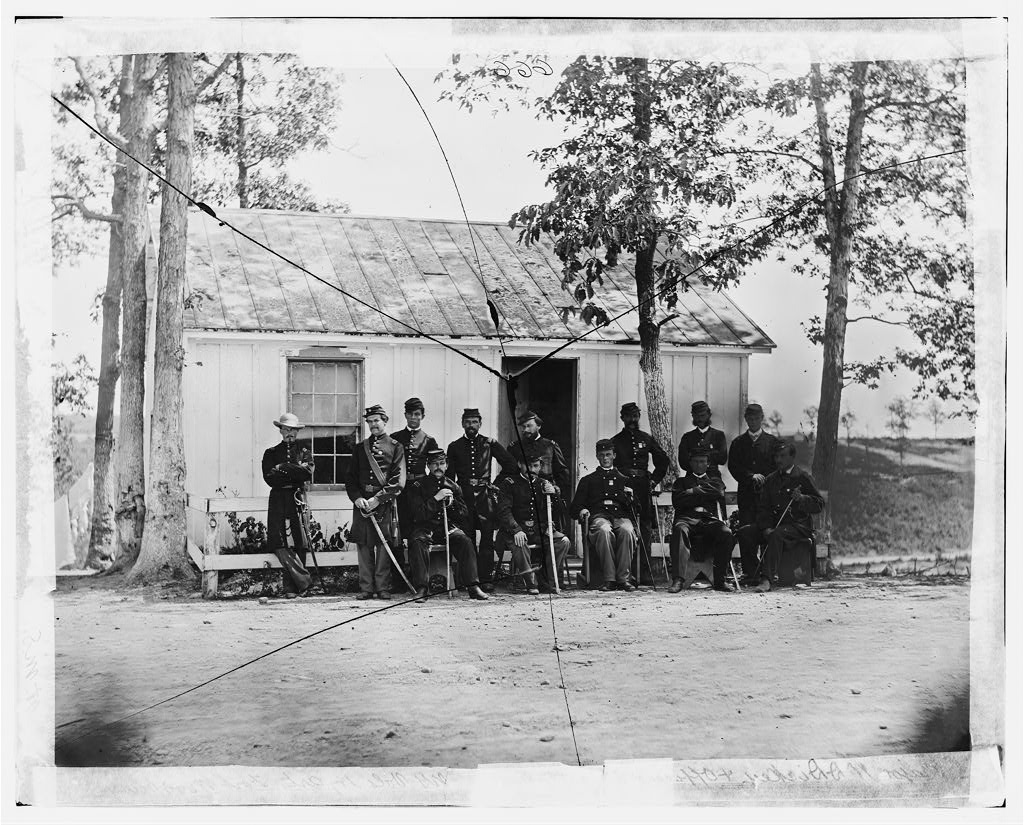
Officers of 3rd Battalion, 15th New York Heavy Artillery at Fort Woodbury, August 1864

== Post war ==
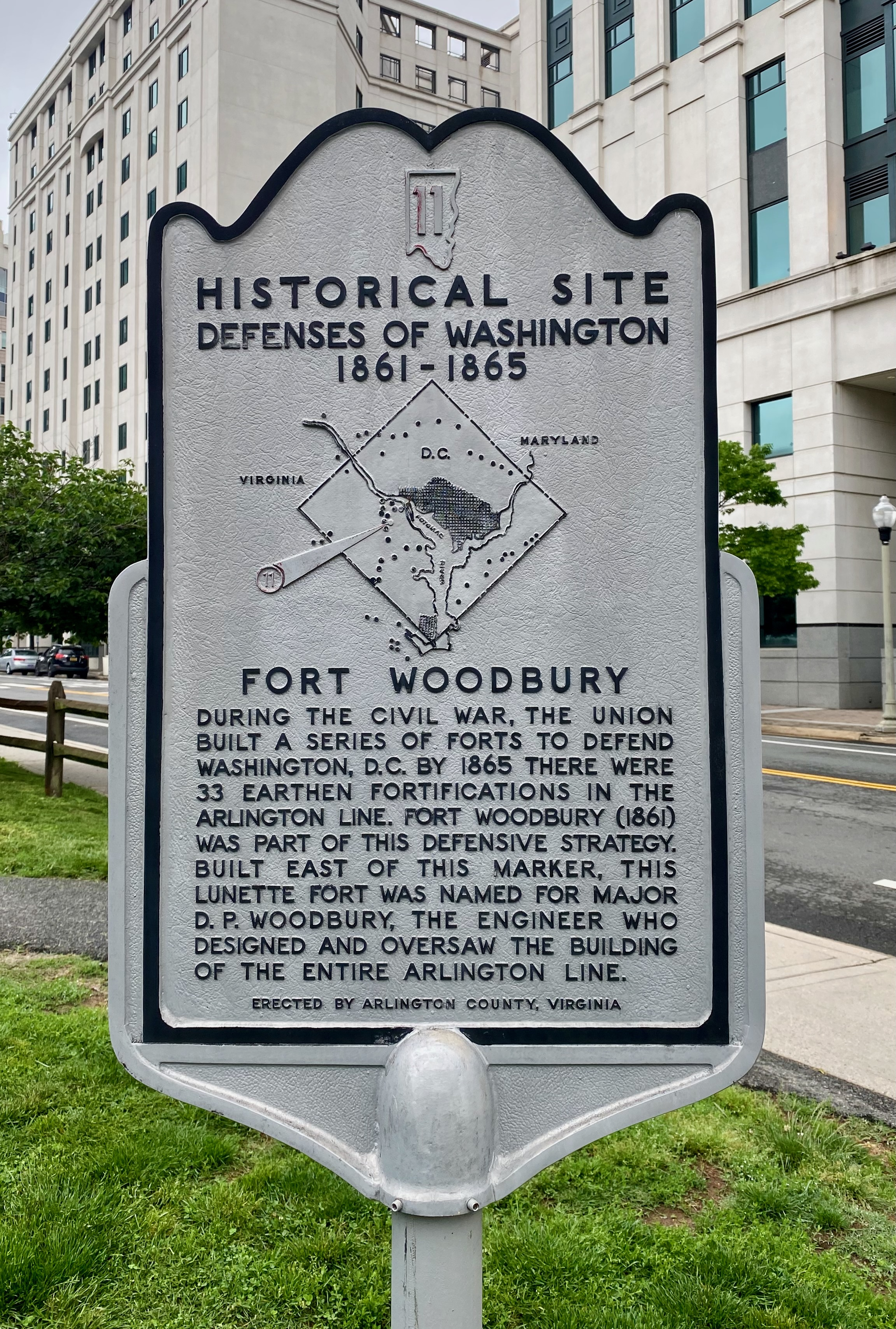
Historical marker commemorating Fort Woodbury

The hill where Fort Woodbury stood was selected for Arlington's first courthouse in 1898, and eventually became the location of Arlington's Court House neighborhood. No visible remains of the fort exist; it was located at intersection of Troy Street N and 14th Street N. Fort Woodbury is commemorated by a historical marker on the corner of 14th Street N and Courthouse Road. The marker reads:

During the Civil War, the Union built a series of forts to defend Washington, D.C. By 1865 there were 33 earthen fortifications in the Arlington Line. Fort Woodbury (1861) was part of this defensive strategy. Built east of this marker, this lunette was named for Major D. P. Woodbury, the engineer who designed and oversaw the building of the entire Arlington Line.

== See also ==
- Arlington Line
- Civil War Defenses of Washington
- Virginia in the American Civil War

== Bibliography ==
- Barrett, O. S. (1888). Reminiscences, Incidents, Battles, Marches and Camp Life of the Old 4th Michigan Infantry in War of Rebellion, 1861-1864. Detroit, Michigan: W. S. Ostler.
- Cooling, Benjamin Franklin; Owen, Walton H. (2010). Mr. Lincoln's forts: a guide to the Civil War defenses of Washington (New ed.). Lanham, Md: Scarecrow Press. ISBN 978-0-8108-6307-1.
- Rose, Jeanne (October 1979). "A History of the Arlington County Courthouse" (PDF). Arlington Historical Magazine. 6 (3): 32–41.
- Rose Jr., C. B. (October 1960). "Civil War Forts in Arlington" (PDF). Arlington Historical Magazine. 1 (4): 15.
- Sprenger, George F. (1885). Concise History of the Camp and Field Life of the 122d Regiment, Penn'a Volunteers: Compiled from Notes, Sketches, Facts and Incidents. Lancaster, Pennsylvania: New Era Steam Book Print.
