= 138th =

138th may refer to:

- 138th (Edmonton, Alberta) Battalion, CEF, a unit in the Canadian Expeditionary Force during the First World War
- 138th (Lincoln and Leicester) Brigade, infantry brigade of the British Army that saw active service in World War I
- 138th Aero Squadron, Air Service, United States Army unit that fought on the Western Front during World War I
- 138th Attack Squadron, unit of the New York Air National Guard 174th Attack Wing located at Hancock Field Air National Guard Base, Syracuse, New York
- 138th Brigade (People's Republic of China), one of the five maneuver elements of the 26th Group Army in the Jinan Military Region
- 138th Delaware General Assembly, meeting of the legislative branch of the state government, consisting of the Delaware Senate and House of Representatives
- 138th Field Artillery Brigade, field artillery (also known as fires) brigade of the United States Army
- 138th Fighter Wing, unit of the Oklahoma Air National Guard, stationed at the Tulsa International Airport, Tulsa, Oklahoma
- 138th Georgia General Assembly succeeded the 137th and served as the precedent for the 139th General Assembly in 1987
- 138th Guards Motor Rifle Brigade, a formation of the Russian Ground Forces
- 138th Illinois Volunteer Infantry Regiment, infantry regiment from Illinois that served in the Union Army during the American Civil War
- 138th Indiana Infantry Regiment served in the Union Army during the American Civil War
- 138th Infantry Regiment (United States), infantry battalion in the Missouri National Guard
- 138th meridian east, line of longitude across the Arctic Ocean, Asia, the Pacific Ocean, Australasia, the Indian Ocean, the Southern Ocean, and Antarctica
- 138th meridian west, line of longitude across the Arctic Ocean, North America, the Pacific Ocean, the Southern Ocean, and Antarctica
- 138th New York State Legislature
- 138th Ohio Infantry, an infantry regiment in the Union Army during the American Civil War
- 138th Pennsylvania Infantry, infantry regiment that served in the Union Army during the American Civil War
- 138th Rifle Division (Soviet Union) began service as a standard Red Army rifle division
- 138th Street (IRT Third Avenue Line), station on the demolished IRT Third Avenue Line
- 138th Street (Manhattan), New York
- 138th Street – Grand Concourse (IRT Jerome Avenue Line), local station on the IRT Jerome Avenue Line of the New York City Subway
- 138th Street Bridge, vertical lift bridge carrying the Metro-North Railroad across the Harlem River
- Connecticut's 138th assembly district elects one member of the Connecticut House of Representatives
- Pennsylvania's 138th Representative District or Pennsylvania House of Representatives, District 138
- The Simpsons 138th Episode Spectacular" is the tenth episode of The Simpsons' seventh season
- Third Avenue – 138th Street (IRT Pelham Line), express station on the IRT Pelham Line of the New York City Subway

== See also ==
- 138 (number)
- AD 138, the year 138 (CXXXVIII) of the Julian calendar
- 138 BC
