= 1st Massachusetts Heavy Artillery Regiment =

1st Massachusetts Heavy Artillery Regiment, U.S. Volunteers
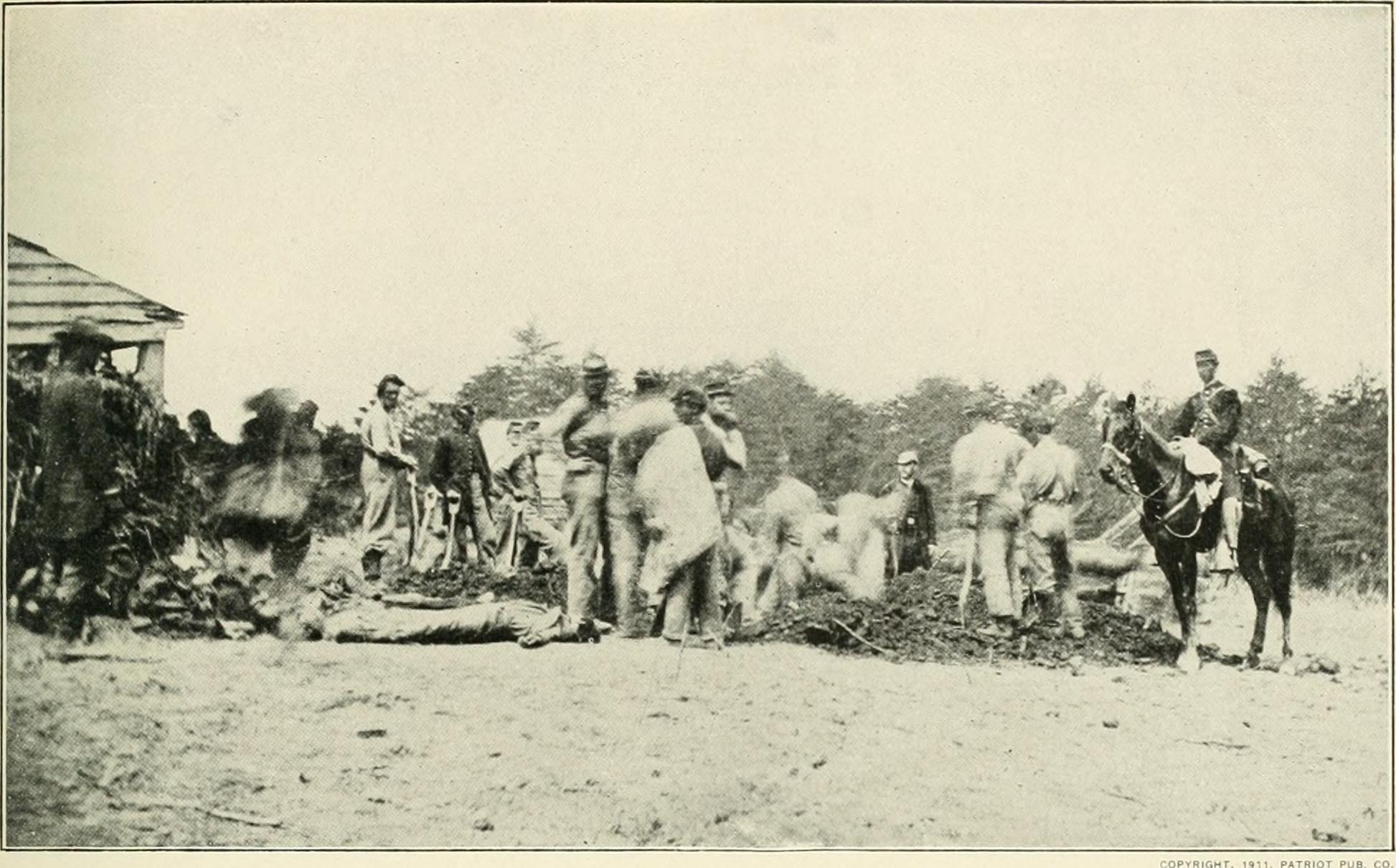
- Men of the 1st Massachusetts burying Confederate dead on May 19, 1864 at the Alsop farm after the Harris Farm Engagement, part of the Battle of Spotsylvania
- Active: Spring 1861 to August 1865
- Country: United States of America
- Allegiance: Union
- Branch: Union Army
- Type: Heavy artillery
- Size: 2552

Commanders
- Colonel: William B. Greene
- Lieutenant Colonel: Levi P. Wright

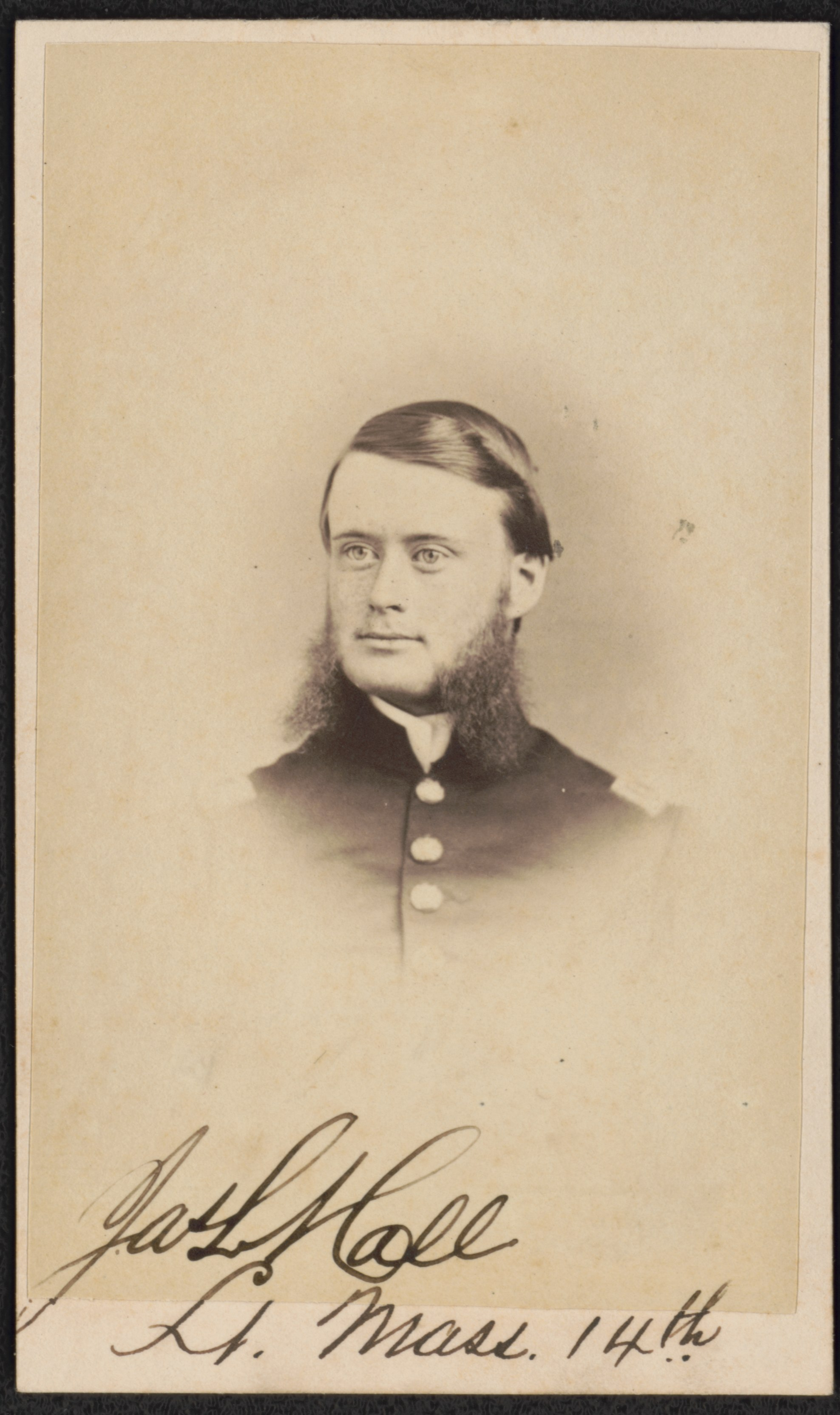
Lieutenant James L. Hall of Co. L, 1st Massachusetts Heavy Artillery Regiment

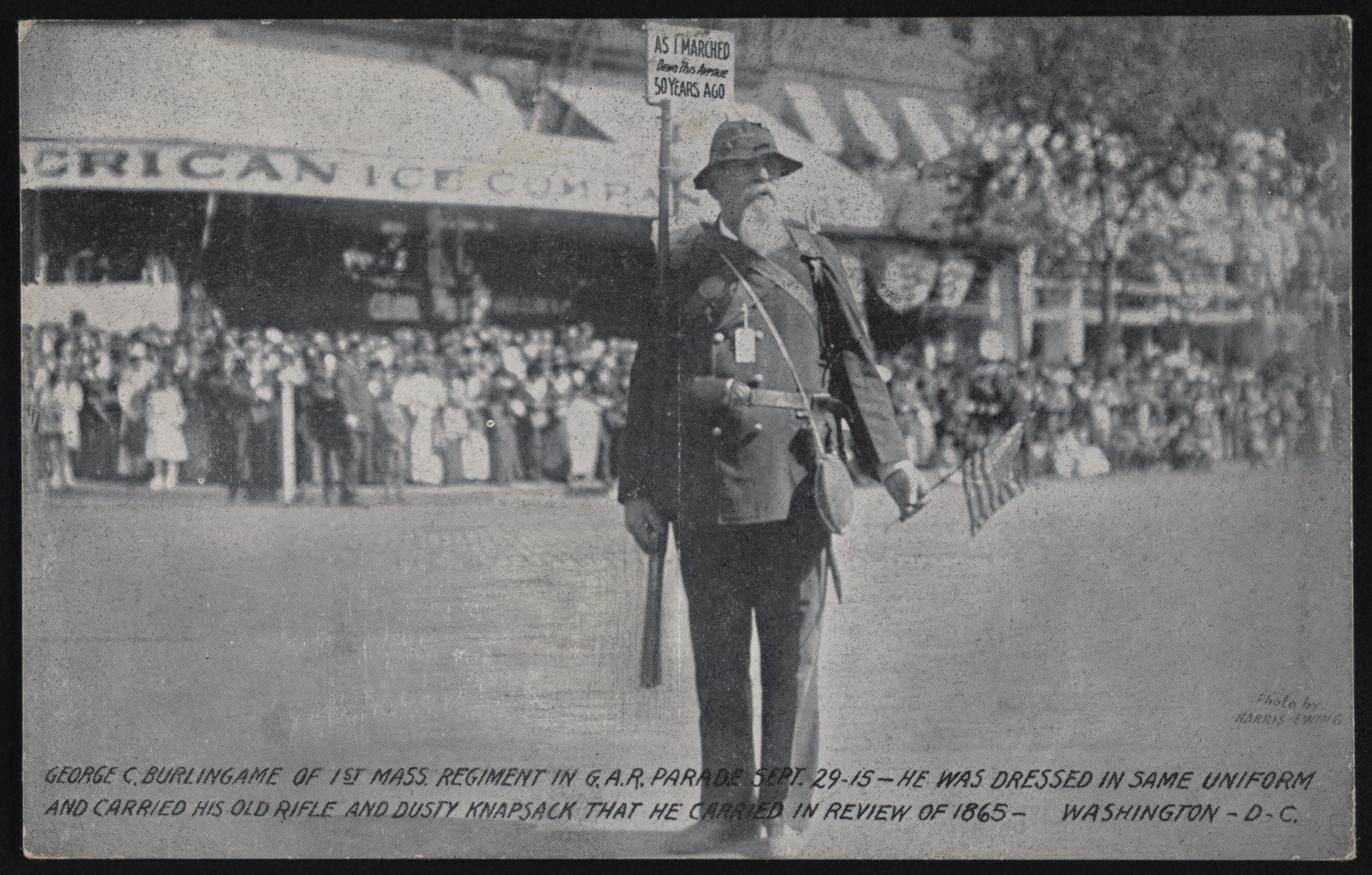
George Burlingame of 1st Mass. Regiment in G.A.R. parade of 29 September 1915. He was dressed in same uniform and carried his old rifle and dusty knapsack that he carried in review of 1865, Washington, D.C.

The 1st Massachusetts Volunteer Heavy Artillery Regiment was a unit that served in the Union Army during the American Civil War. It was originally raised as the 14th Massachusetts Volunteer Infantry Regiment.

== History ==
=== 14th Mass Infantry ===
The 14th Massachusetts Infantry began its recruitment in spring 1861, with most of its members coming from Essex County. They were mustered in on 5 July 1861, and left the state on 7 August for Washington, DC, where it would serve in its defenses until the end of the year. Colonel William B. Greene, a West Point graduate and a veteran of the Florida Indian Wars, resigned in October, and was replaced as leader of the unit by Colonel Thomas R. Tannatt, who transferred over from the 16th Regiment Massachusetts Volunteer Infantry.

=== Reorganization as artillery ===
On 1 January 1862, the regiment was reorganized and became a heavy artillery regiment. As artillery units required more men, fifty additional soldiers were added to each company and two additional ones were formed. They served in several military garrisons around Washington, including forts Woodbury, Tillinghast, Craig, Albany, and DeKalb.

=== Early skirmishes ===
On 26 August 1862, the regiment was sent to the front, and was present at the Second Battle of Bull Run, though it did not participate. During the Union retreat from the battlefield, Confederate cavalry overtook the 1st Massachusetts, capturing the surgical staff, the wagoners, and others. The doctors were quickly released, while the others were later paroled.

A battalion of two companies were detached (two more joined a month or two later) on 27 September 1862 and sent to Maryland Heights, where they were to serve until December 1863. When the Union army abandoned its position at Winchester, VA in June 1863, Company I stayed behind to destroy the guns and ammunition, and 44 men were captured on 10 June. At this time, Company H was covering the army's retreat from Harpers Ferry.

=== First engagement ===
On 17 May 1864, many heavy artillery regiments filled in as infantry units and joined the Army of the Potomac as part of Grant's 1864 campaign. In their first real engagement as a regiment, they engaged Ewell's Division at Harris Farm Engagement, on the Fredericksburg Road near Spotsylvania, VA on 19 May 1864. In this battle, they lost 55 killed, 312 wounded, and 27 missing. In reserve during the Battle of North Anna on 23–26 May 1864, losing only 1 killed, they moved on to Cold Harbor, losing two members during the trench warfare there from 4–12 June.

=== Siege of Petersburg ===
The regiment took part in the assault on Petersburg on the 16 June 1864, and lost 25 killed and 132 wounded. They remained as part of the siege of the city until April 1865. During this time, they were also involved in the Battle of Globe Tavern (or the 2nd Battle of Weldon Railroad), when 185 men were captured when a Confederate offensive flanked the division, and the Battle of Hatcher's Run.

=== Lee's surrender ===
Following Lee's surrender in April 1865, the 1st Massachusetts Heavy Artillery returned to Washington, DC and stationed the forts until they were mustered out in August. They returned to Boston on the 20th, and were encamped at Gallop's Island until the 25th, when they were paid and discharged.

== Complement ==
Through its four years of service, the regiment had a total of 2552 soldiers in its ranks, consisting of 24 field officers and staff, 111 line officers, and 2417 enlisted men.

== Losses ==
A total of 486 officers and men were lost, 215 of them killed or died of wounds, 115 died by disease or accident, 156 died as prisoners, and four dead listed as MIA.

== See also ==
- List of Massachusetts Civil War Units
- Massachusetts in the American Civil War
