= 138th Division =

In military terms, 138th Division or 138th Infantry Division may refer to:

- 138th Division (1st Formation) (People's Republic of China), 1948–1953
- 138th Division (Imperial Japanese Army)
- 138th Rifle Division, Soviet Union

== See also ==
- List of military divisions by number
- 138th Brigade (disambiguation)
- 138th Regiment (disambiguation)
- 138th (disambiguation)
