= 138th Ohio Infantry Regiment =

- Active: May 14, 1864, to September 1, 1864
- Country: United States
- Allegiance: Union
- Branch: Infantry

Insignia
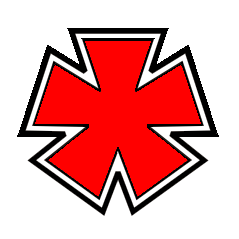
- XXII Corps

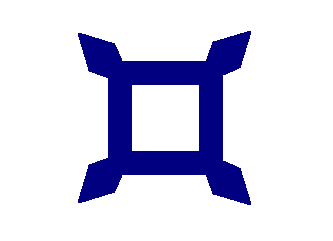
- 3rd Division, X Corps

The 138th Ohio Infantry Regiment, sometimes 138th Ohio Volunteer Infantry (or 138th OVI) was an infantry regiment in the Union Army during the American Civil War.

== Service ==
The 138th Ohio Infantry was organized at Camp Dennison near Cincinnati, Ohio, and mustered on May 14, 1864, for 100 days service.

The regiment was attached to the 1st Brigade, DeRussy's Division, XXII Corps. Assigned to 2nd Brigade, 3rd Division, X Corps, Army of the James.

The 138th Ohio Infantry mustered out of service at Camp Dennison on September 1, 1864.

== Detailed service ==
Left Ohio for Washington, D.C., on May 14. Picket duty at Harpers Ferry, West Virginia, May 16–22. Reached Washington May 22. Assigned to garrison duty at Forts Albany, Craig, and Tillinghast, defenses of Washington, south of the Potomac, until June 5. Moved to White House Landing, Virginia, June 5. Picket and guard duty there until June 16. Moved to Bermuda Hundred, Virginia, June 16. Picket and fatigue duty at Bermuda Hundred, Point of Rocks, Broadway Landing, and Cherrystone Inlet until August.

== Ohio National Guard ==
Over 35,000 Ohio National Guardsmen were federalized and organized into regiments for 100 days service in May 1864. Shipped to the Eastern Theater, they were designed to be placed in "safe" rear areas to protect railroads and supply points, thereby freeing regular troops for Lt. Gen. Ulysses S. Grant’s push on the Confederate capital of Richmond, Virginia. As events transpired, many units found themselves in combat, stationed in the path of Confederate Gen. Jubal Early’s veteran Army of the Valley during its famed Valley Campaigns of 1864. Ohio Guard units met the battle-tested foe head on and helped blunt the Confederate offensive thereby saving Washington, D.C. from capture. Ohio National Guard units participated in the battles of Monacacy, Fort Stevens, Harpers Ferry, and in the siege of Petersburg.

== Casualties ==
The regiment lost 8 enlisted men during service, all due to disease.

== See also ==
- List of Ohio Civil War units
- Ohio in the Civil War
