= 138th Illinois Infantry Regiment =

- Active: June 21–October 14, 1864
- Disbanded: October 14, 1864
- Country: United States
- Allegiance: Union
- Branch: Infantry
- Size: Regiment (Note: According to Brigadier General J.N. Reece (1900), The Report of the Adjutant General of the State of Illinois. Containing reports for the years 1861–1866. Volume 7., the 138th Illinois Infantry Regiment was composed of ten companies. Companies "A" to "I" and "K".)
- Garrison/HQ: Fort Leavenworth, Kansas
- Engagements: American Civil War

Commanders
- Colonel: John W. Goodwin
- Lieutenant Colonel: Alexander H. Holt
- Major: John Tunison

The 138th Illinois Infantry Regiment was an infantry regiment from Illinois that served in the Union Army between June 21 and October 14, 1864, during the American Civil War.

== Service ==
The regiment was organized at Camp Wood, Quincy, Illinois and mustered in for one-hundred day service on June 21, 1864, with Colonel J.W. Goodwin as commander. The Secretary of War, Edwin M. Stanton, ordered the regiment to proceed to Fort Leavenworth, Kansas, where it was assigned to garrison duty.

The counties of Jackson, Clay, Platte, Ray, Lafayette as well as other counties along the western border of Missouri, were over-run by bands of pro-Confederate bushwhackers. On July 7, Companies "C" and "F" were ordered to Weston, Missouri, and during July, August, and a portion of September, they remained on active duty and succeeded in clearing the counties of bushwhackers. Following the defeat of the bushwhackers, Companies "C" and "F" returned to garrison duty at Fort Leavenworth.

In the meantime, General Sterling Price, had invaded and occupied Missouri from the southeast, cutting off communications between St. Louis and the southeast. The regiment voluntarily extended its term of service and proceeded along the Iron Mountain Railroad guarding railway bridges from destruction by Price's Army. Following the defeat of General Price's army, the regiment returned to Camp Butler, Illinois and was mustered out on October 14, 1864. During its service the regiment incurred ten fatalities.

== See also ==
- List of Illinois Civil War Units

== Bibliography ==
- Dyer, Frederick H. (1959). A Compendium of the War of the Rebellion. New York and London. Thomas Yoseloff, Publisher. LCCN 59-12963.
- Reece. Brigadier General J.N. (1900). The Report of Illinois from Military and Naval Department of the Adjutant General of the State of Illinois. Containing Reports for the Years 1861–1866. Springfield, Illinois. Journal Company, Printers and Binders.
