= Arlington Line =

Union Army fortifications around Washington, D.C. during the Civil War (1860s)

Coordinates: 38°53′22.5″N 77°5′1.5″W

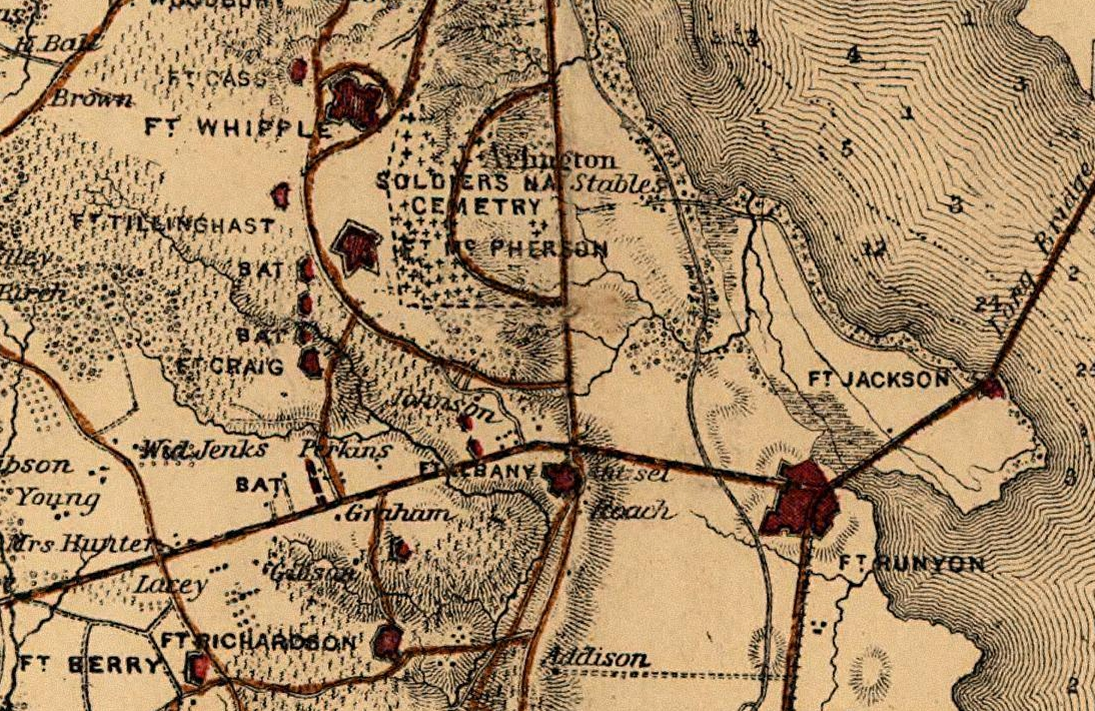
1865 map showing Fort Craig and nearby fortifications on the Arlington Line

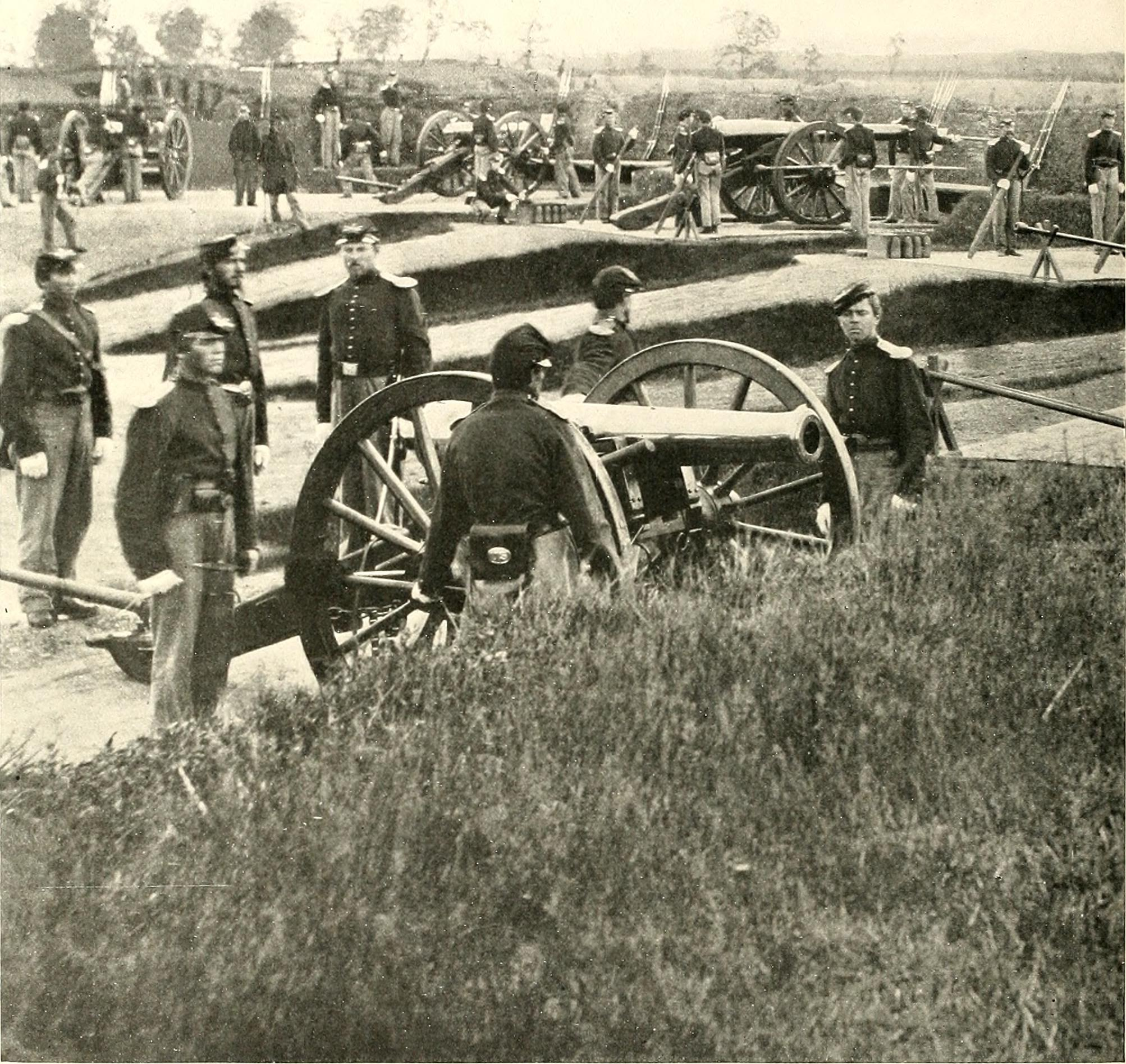
Battery at Fort Whipple

The Arlington Line was a series of fortifications that the Union Army erected in Alexandria County (now Arlington County), Virginia, to protect the City of Washington during the American Civil War (see Civil War Defenses of Washington and Washington, D.C., in the American Civil War).

Just across the Potomac River from the Union capital city, Confederate Virginia was a major Union concern when the war began. In May 1861, federal troops seized much the County and immediately began constructing a group of forts near Washington on the Virginia side of the River to protect the capital city.

After the Confederate Army routed the Union Army at the First Battle of Bull Run (Manassas) in late July 1861, the Union Army began construction on a line of breastworks and lunettes to the west of the earlier fortifications. These and larger fortifications later constructed nearby became known as the Arlington Line. They included a lunette (Fort Cass) and Fort Whipple, which became parts of Fort Myer, later to be renamed as Joint Base Myer–Henderson Hall.

The Arlington Line was never attacked, even after the federal defeat at the Second Battle of Bull Run (Manassas) in late August 1862. The Line therefore effectively served its strategic purpose.

Major Daniel Phineas Woodbury was the Union engineer who designed and constructed the Arlington Line. One of its forts, Fort Woodbury (which once stood in what is today Arlington's Courthouse neighborhood), was named for him.

== References/External links ==
- Arlington Historical Society - Military-use structures
