= 138th Pennsylvania Infantry Regiment =

Union Army infantry regiment

138th Regiment, Pennsylvania Volunteer Infantry
- Active: August 16, 1862, to June 23, 1865
- Country: United States
- Allegiance: Union
- Branch: Infantry
- Engagements: Bristoe Campaign; Mine Run Campaign; Battle of the Wilderness; Battle of Spotsylvania Court House; Battle of Totopotomoy Creek; Battle of Cold Harbor; Battle of Monocacy; Shenandoah Valley Campaign; Third Battle of Winchester; Battle of Cedar Creek; Siege of Petersburg; Appomattox Campaign; Battle of Sayler's Creek

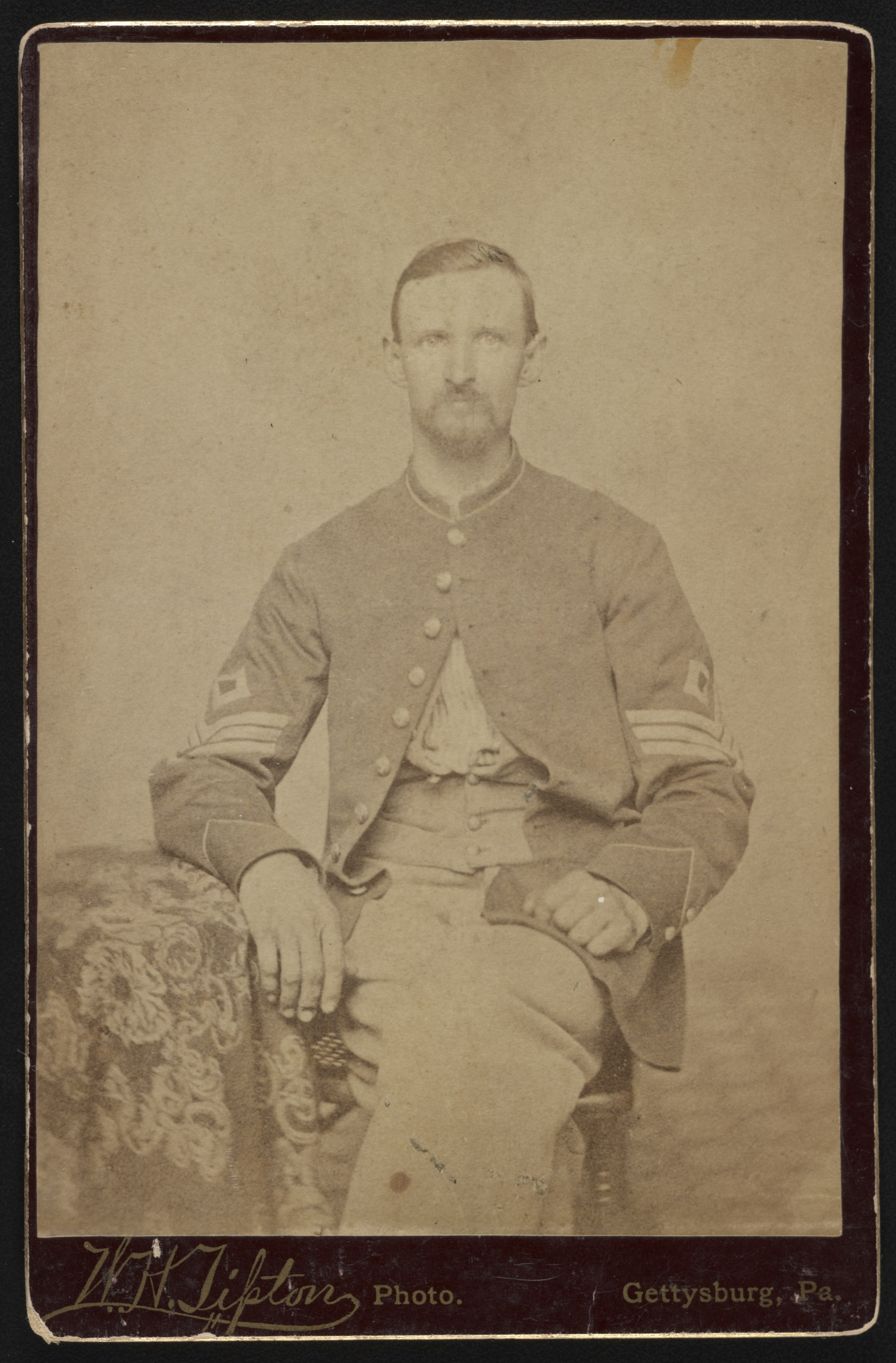
Sergeant Nicholas G. Wilson of Co. G, 138th Pennsylvania Infantry Regiment. From the Liljenquist Family Collection of Civil War Photographs, Prints and Photographs Division, Library of Congress

The 138th Regiment, Pennsylvania Volunteer Infantry was an infantry regiment that served in the Union Army during the American Civil War.

== Service ==
The 138th Pennsylvania Infantry was organized at Harrisburg, Pennsylvania, and mustered in for a three-year enlistment on August 16, 1862, under the command of Colonel Charles L. K. Sumwalt.

The regiment was attached to Relay House, Defenses of Baltimore, VIII Corps, Middle Department, to February 1863. 3rd Separate Brigade, VIII Corps, to June 1863. Elliott's Command, VIII Corps, to July 1863. 2nd Brigade, 3rd Division, III Corps, Army of the Potomac, to March 1864. 2nd Brigade, 3rd Division, VI Corps, Army of the Potomac and Army of the Shenandoah, to June 1865.

The 138th Pennsylvania Infantry mustered out of service on June 23, 1865.

== Detailed service ==
Moved to Baltimore, Md., August 30, thence to Relay House. Duty at Relay House, Md., until June 1863. Moved to Harper's Ferry, W. Va., June 16. Escort stores to Washington July 1–5. Join Division at Frederick, Md., July 7. Pursuit of Lee July 7–24. Wapping Heights July 23. Bristoe Campaign October 9–22. Advance to line of the Rappahannock November 7–8. Kelly's Ford November 7. Brandy Station November 8. Mine Run Campaign November 26-December 2. Payne's Farm November 27. Demonstration on the Rapidan February 6–7, 1864. Duty at and near Brandy Station until May. Rapidan Campaign May 4-June 12. Battles of the Wilderness May 5–7; Spotsylvania May 8–12; Spotsylvania Court House May 12–21. Assault on the Salient May 12. North Anna River May 23–26. On line of the Pamunkey May 26–28. Totopotomoy May 28–31. Cold Harbor June 1–12. Before Petersburg June 17–18. Jerusalem Plank Road, Weldon Railroad, June 22–23. Siege of Petersburg until July 6. Moved to Baltimore, Md., July 6–8. Battle of Monocacy July 9. Pursuit of Early to Snicker's Gap July 14–24. Sheridan's Shenandoah Valley Campaign August to December. Charlestown August 21–22. Battle of Opequan, Winchester, September 19. Fisher's Hill, September 22. Battle of Cedar Creek October 19. Duty at Kernstown until December. Moved to Washington, D.C., thence to Petersburg, Va., December. Siege of Petersburg December 1864 to April 1865. Fort Fisher, Petersburg, March 25, 1865. Appomattox Campaign March 28-April 9. Assault on and fall of Petersburg April 2. Sayler's Creek April 6. Appomattox Court House April 9. Surrender of Lee and his army. March to Danville April 23–27, and duty there until May 23. March to Richmond, Va., thence to Washington, D. C., May 23-June 3, Corps review June 8.

== Casualties ==
The regiment lost a total of 167 men during service; 6 officers and 90 enlisted men killed or mortally wounded, 1 officer and 70 enlisted men died of disease.

== Commanders ==
- Colonel Charles L. K. Sumwalt
- Colonel Matthew Robert McClennan
- Major Lewis A. May - commanded at the Battle of Monocacy

== Notable members ==
- Corporal Trustrim Connell, Company I - Medal of Honor recipient for action at the battle of Sayler's Creek
- Corporal John W. Mauk, Company F - killed Confederate General A. P. Hill at Petersburg, April 2, 1865
- Corporal Peter Thorn, Company B - caretaker of Evergreen Cemetery in Gettysburg

== See also ==
- List of Pennsylvania Civil War Units
- Pennsylvania in the Civil War
