= 138th Indiana Infantry Regiment =

- Active: May 27, 1864 – September 22, 1864
- Disbanded: September 22, 1864
- Country: United States
- Allegiance: Union
- Branch: Infantry
- Size: Regiment
- Engagements: American Civil War

The 138th Indiana Infantry Regiment served in the Union Army between May 27 and September 22, 1864, during the American Civil War.

== Service ==
The regiment was organized at Indianapolis, Indiana and mustered in on May 27, 1864. It was ordered to Tennessee and Alabama for railroad guard duty, until late September 1864. The regiment was mustered out on September 22, 1864. During its service the regiment lost eight men to disease and one to desertion.

The regiment was part of Indiana's quota of Hundred Days Men, which also included seven other regiments.

=== Companies and their counties of origin ===
Men often enlisted in a company recruited in the counties where they lived, though not always. After many battles, companies might be combined because so many men were killed or wounded.

- Company A - mostly from Miami County, Indiana
- Company B - mostly from La Porte County, Indiana
- Company C - mostly from Porter County, Indiana
- Company D - mostly from La Porte County, Indiana and St. Joseph County, Indiana
- Company E - mostly from Marshall County, Indiana
- Company F - mostly from Wabash County, Indiana
- Company G - mostly from Wabash County, Indiana
- Company H - mostly from St. Joseph County, Indiana
- Company I - mostly from Wells County, Indiana, Huntington County, Indiana,& and Blackford County, Indiana
- Company K - mostly from Cass County, Indiana

== See also ==
- List of Indiana Civil War regiments

== Bibliography ==
- Dyer, Frederick H. (1959). A Compendium of the War of the Rebellion. New York and London. Thomas Yoseloff, Publisher. LCCN 59-12963.
- Howard, Timothy Edward (1907). A History of St. Joseph County, Indiana. Lewis Publishing Company.
- "Indiana Volunteers" (PDF). civilwarindex.com.
