= Fort Tillinghast =

- Part of the Civil War defenses of Washington, D.C.
- Arlington County, Virginia
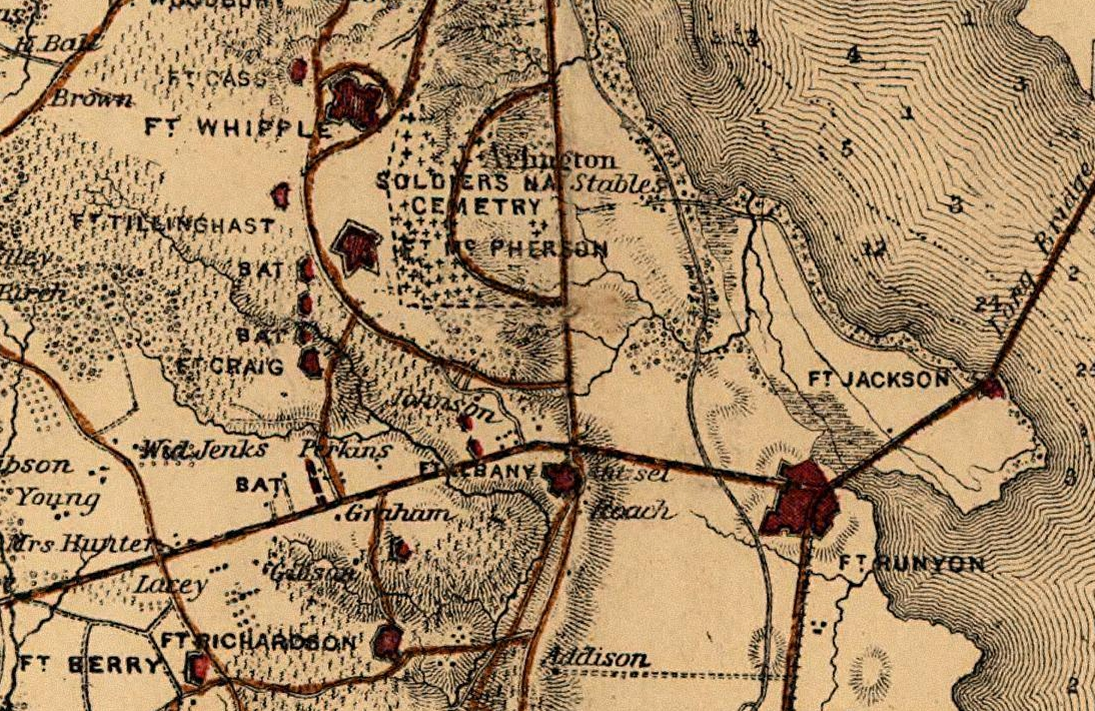
- Map of Fort Craig and surrounding area including Fort Tillinghast, 1865.

Site information
- Type: Earthwork fort
- Controlled by: Union Army
- Condition: Residential Area

Location
- Coordinates: 38°52′46.2″N 77°05′08.2″W

Site history
- Built: 1861
- Built by: U.S. Army Corps of Engineers
- In use: 1861–1865
- Materials: Earth, timber
- Demolished: 1865
- Battles/wars: American Civil War

Fort Tillinghast was a small lunette that the Union Army constructed in Alexandria County (now Arlington County), Virginia, as part of the Civil War defenses of Washington (see Washington, D.C., in the American Civil War). Fort Tillinghast stood about 0.6 miles away from Arlington House, the Union-occupied estate of Confederate General Robert E. Lee.

== History ==
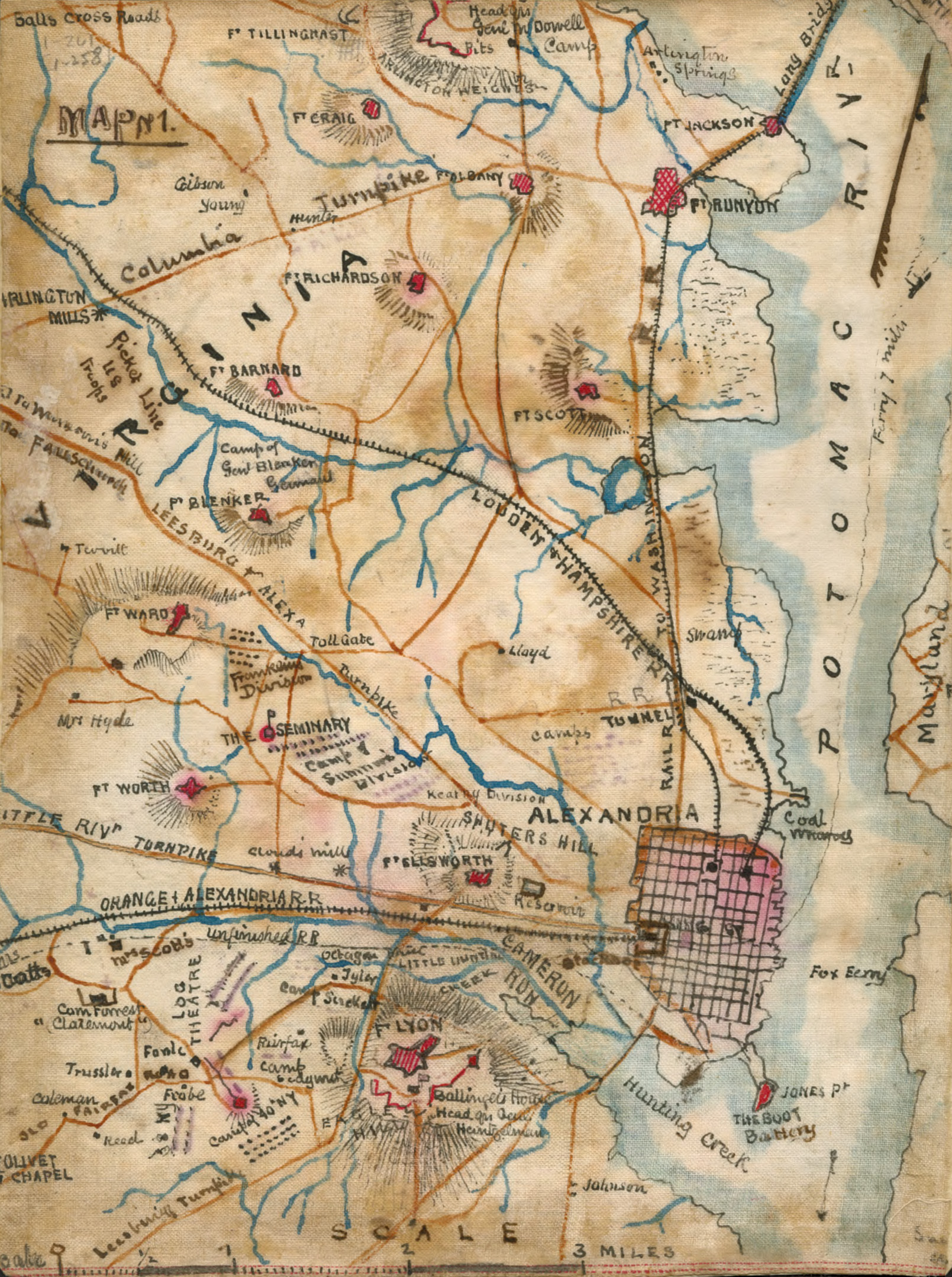
Map of Civil War forts near Alexandria, showing Fort Tillinghast (ca. September 1861)

Following the Union Army's rout at the First Battle of Bull Run (Manassas) in late July 1861, the Union Army constructed Fort Tillinghouse in August of that year. The lunette was part of the Arlington Line and tied into Fort Craig approximately 0.6 miles (1.0 km) to the south and Fort Cass approximately 0.3 miles (0.5 km) to the north. Along with Forts Cass, Woodbury, Morton, and Strong, the fortification covered approaches to the Long Bridge and the Aqueduct Bridge (near the modern Key Bridge).

The lunette was named in honor of Captain Otis H. Tillinghast, Quartermaster, killed at the First Battle of Bull Run on July 21, 1861. Oriented to the west, it had a perimeter of 298 yards (272 m), emplacements for 12 guns, and two magazines as well as a bomb-proof. The fortification's armaments included four 24-pound guns, one 24-pound field howitzer, four 30-pound Parrott rifles, two 20-pound Parrott rifles, and two 24-pound Coehorn mortars. Units garrisoned at the lunette included the 16th Maine Infantry, 1st Massachusetts Heavy Artillery, 4th New York Heavy Artillery, and the 145th and 138th Ohio Infantry.

A May 17, 1864, report from the Union Army's Inspector of Artillery (see Union Army artillery organization) noted the following:

Fort Tillinghast, Major Rolfe commanding.–Garrison, two companies First Massachusetts Heavy Artillery– 7 commissioned officers, 1 ordnance-sergeant, 220 men. Armament, one 24- pounder field howitzer (smooth), two 20-pounder Parrotts (rifled), three 24-pounder siege guns (smooth), one 24-pounder F. D. howitzer, four 30-pounder Parrotts (rifled), two 24-pounder Coehorn mortars. Magazines being rebuilt; at present unserviceable; work progressing slowly; ammunition kept in bomb-proof. Ammunition, full supply and serviceable. Implements, complete and in good order. Drill in artillery, fair. Drill in infantry, fair. Discipline, fair. Garrison sufficient for the work.

In June, 1865, Fort Tillinghast was ordered dismantled and the site returned to its previous owners. The fortification stood near 205 North Wayne Street in Arlington, but no sections remain today. A historic marker, near the intersection of Arlington Boulevard (U.S. 50) and North 2nd Street in Arlington, shows the location where the fort once stood. The marker depicts the fort's position on a map of the city's defenses and states:

Here stood Fort Tillinghast, a lunette in the Arlington Line constructed in August 1861. It had a perimeter of 298 yards and emplacements for 13 guns. A model of this fort, typical of all lunettes in the Arlington Line, can be seen at the Hume School museum of the Arlington Historical Society.
