= Fort Albany (Arlington, Virginia) =

- Arlington, Virginia

Location
- Location within Washington, D.C.
- Coordinates: 38°51′57″N 77°04′00″W

Site history
- Built: 1861

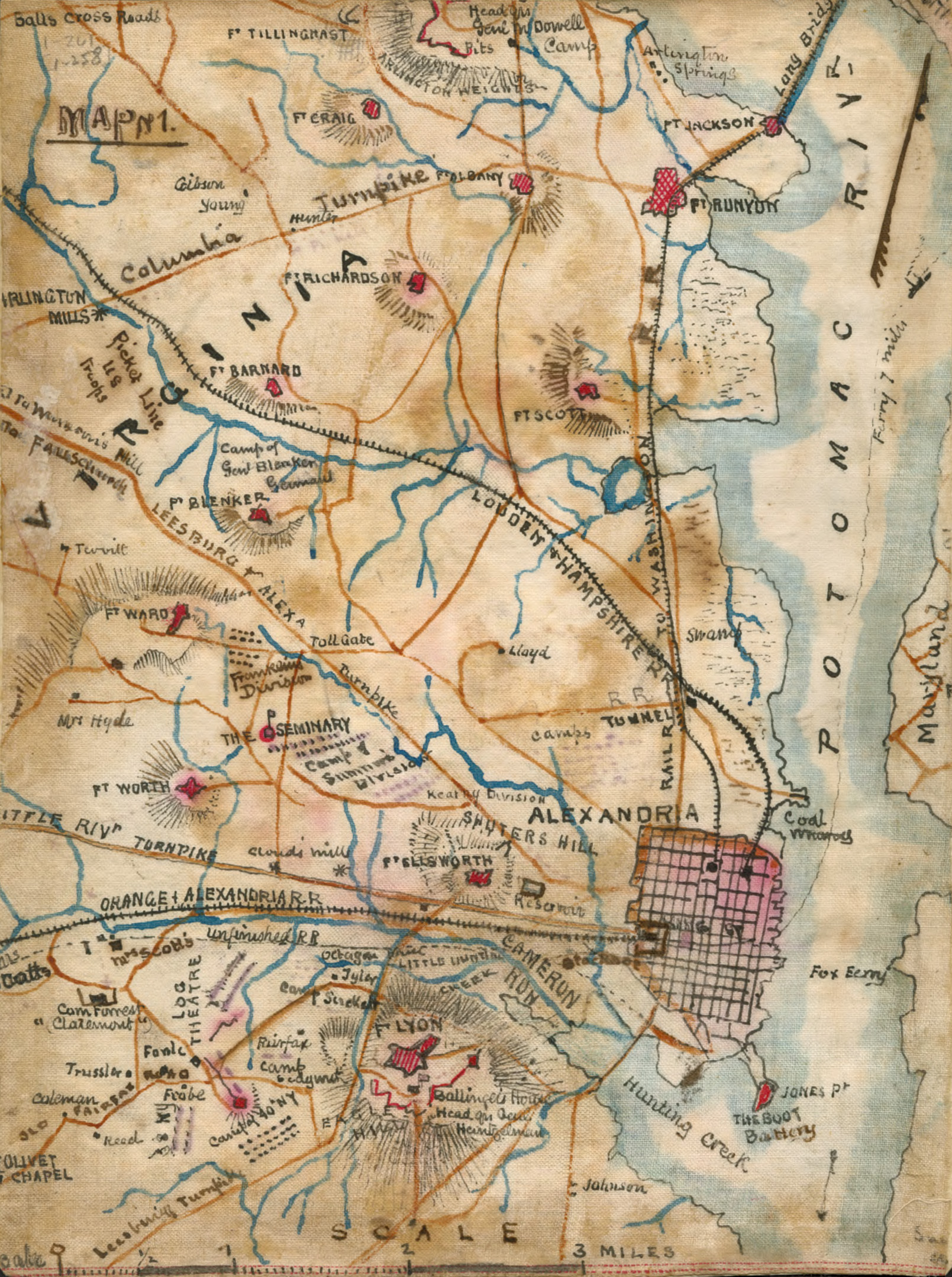
Map of Civil War forts near Alexandria, showing Fort Albany (ca. September 1861)

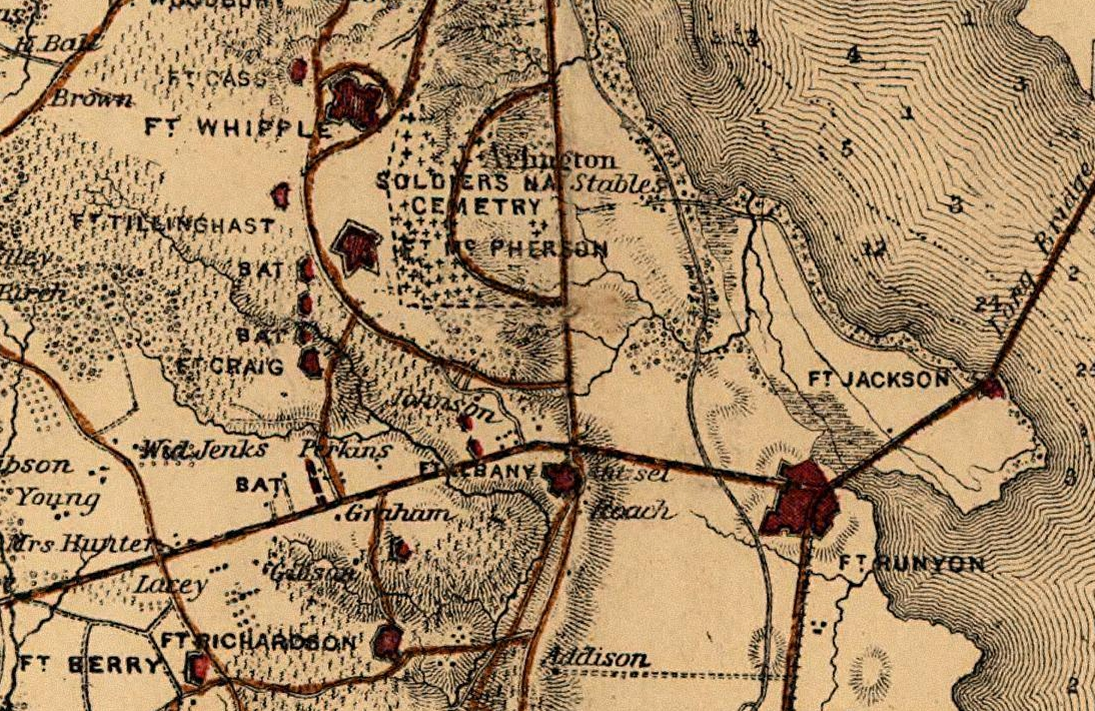
Map of Fort Craig and surrounding area including Fort Albany (1865)

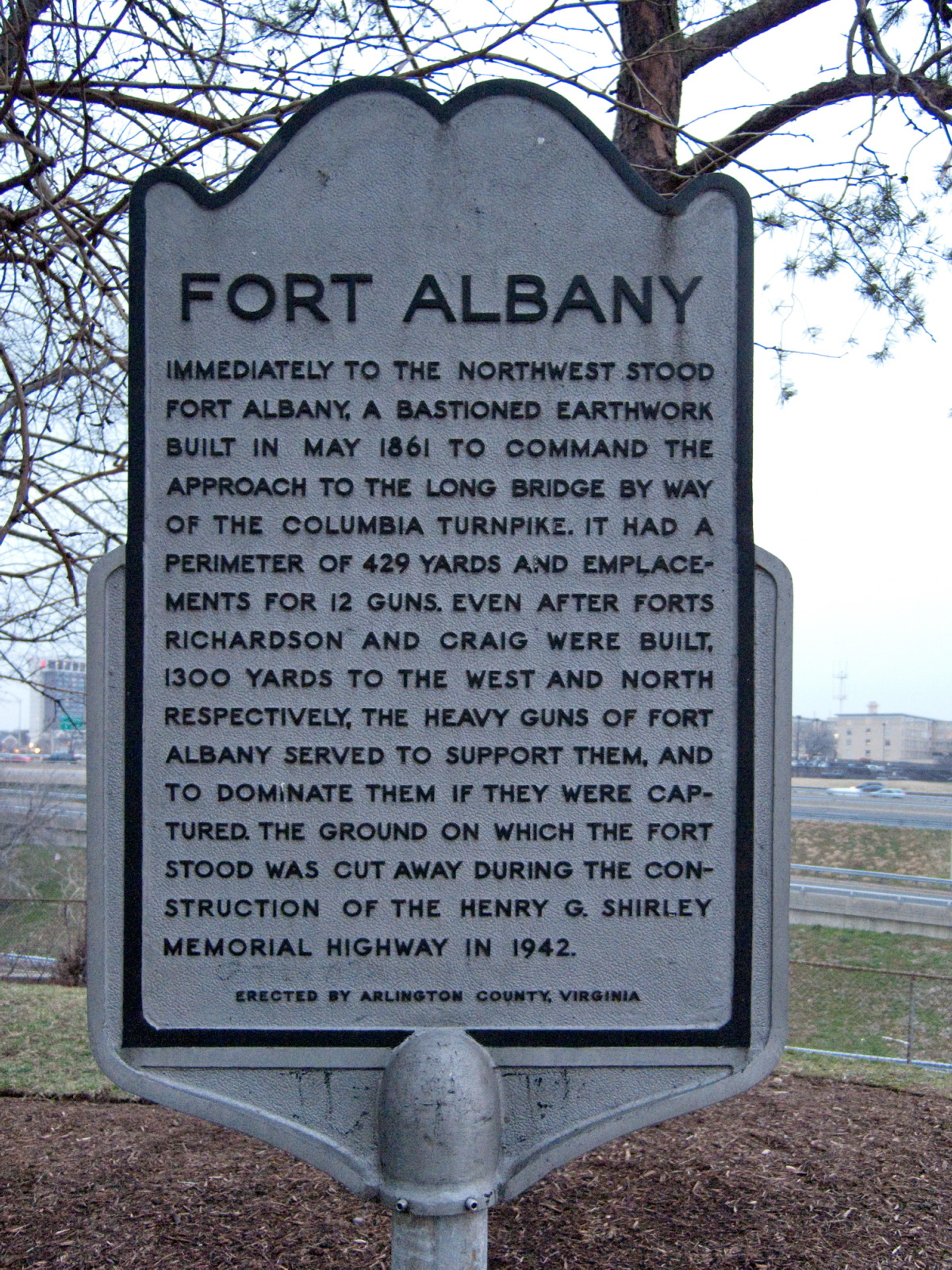
Fort Albany Historical Marker

Fort Albany was a bastioned earthwork that the Union Army built in Arlington County (known at the time as Alexandria County) in Virginia. The Army constructed the fort during May 1861 as part of its Civil War defenses of Washington (see Washington, D.C., in the American Civil War).

The fort was built by New York troops, and therefore named after the state capital of New York. It had a perimeter of 429 yards and emplacements for 12 guns. Fort Richardson, Fort Craig and Fort Tillinghast provided supporting fire for the fort.

A May 17, 1864, report from the Union Army's Inspector of Artillery (see Union Army artillery organization) noted the following:

Fort Albany, Captain Rhodes commanding.–Garrison, one company First Massachusetts Volunteers–5 commissioned officers, 1 ordnance-sergeant, 145 men. Armament, two 24-pounder field howitzers, four 24-pounder siege, two Parrotts, one Coehorn mortar, one 10-inch mortar. Magazines, two; dry and in good order. Ammunition, full supply and in good condition. Implements, complete and in good order. Drill in artillery, fair. Drill in infantry, fair. Discipline, fair. Garrison of sufficient strength. (See: Official Records of the War of the Rebellion)

The fort was abandoned in 1865, after the war ended. No trace of it remains, although a historic marker shows the location where the fort once stood, guarding the approach to the Long Bridge along the Columbia Turnpike, near the modern-day Pentagon. The ground on which the fort stood was cut away during the construction of the Henry G. Shirley Memorial Highway, in 1942.
