= Fort Craig (Virginia) =

Civil War-era fort in Arlington County, Virginia

- Part of the Civil War defenses of Washington, D.C.
- Arlington County, Virginia
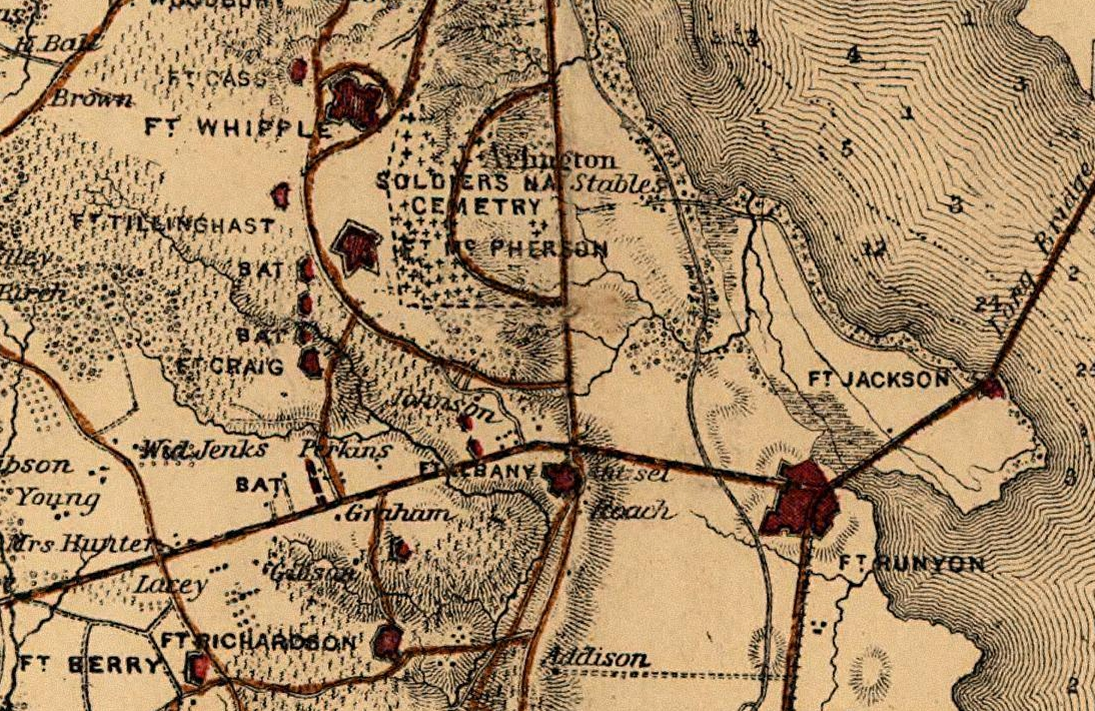
- Map of Fort Craig and surrounding area, 1865.

Site information
- Type: Earthwork fort
- Controlled by: Union Army

Location
- Coordinates: 38°52′13.5″N 77°04′53.7″W

Site history
- Built: 1861
- Built by: U.S. Army Corps of Engineers
- In use: 1865
- Materials: Earth, timber
- Fate: demolished
- Events: American Civil War

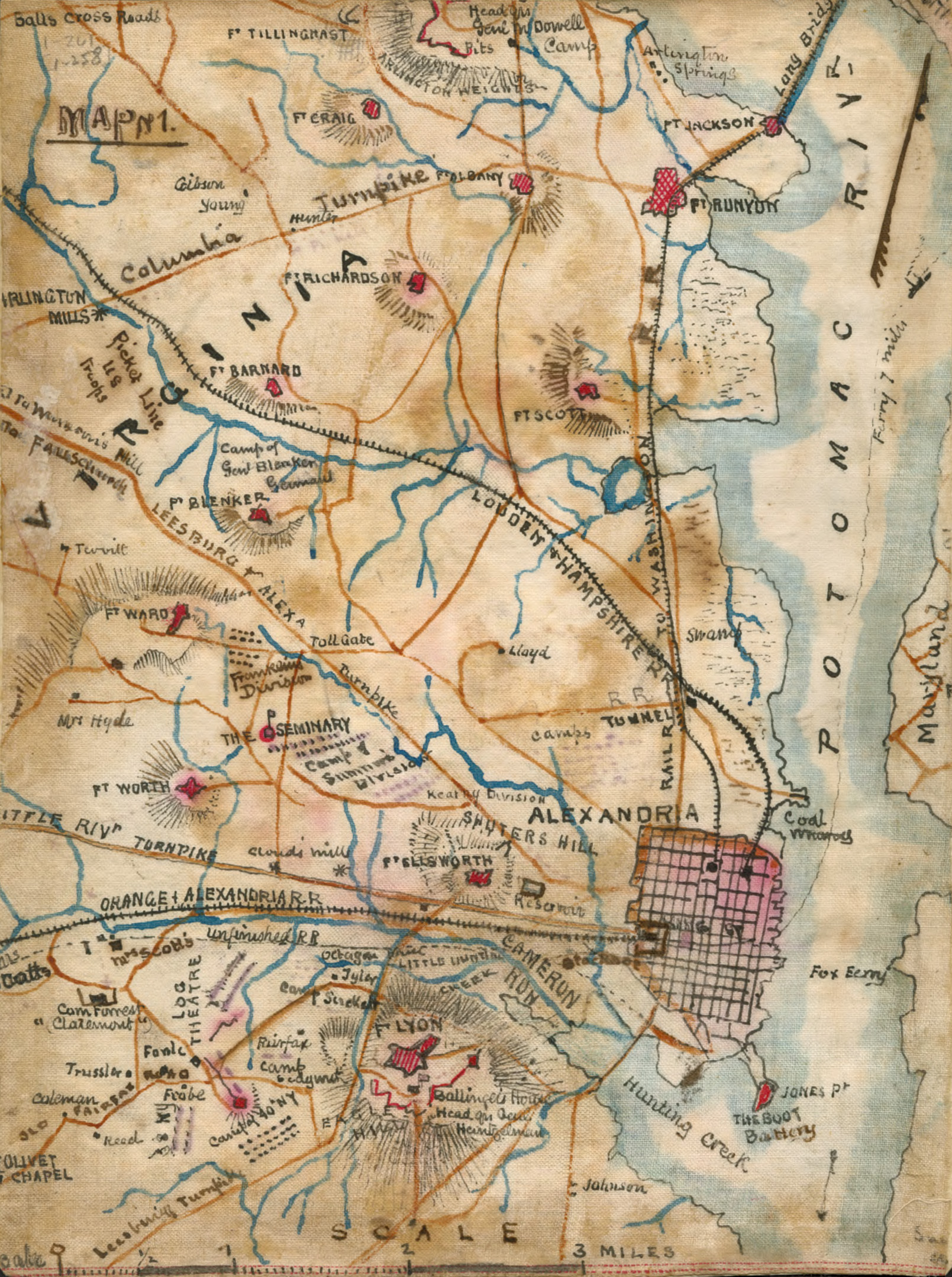
Map of Civil War forts near Alexandria, showing Fort Craig (c. September 1861)

Fort Craig was a small lunette that the Union Army constructed in September 1861 in Arlington County (at that time Alexandria County) in Virginia during the American Civil War. The lunette was part of the Civil War defenses of Washington (see Washington, D.C., in the American Civil War).

The lunette stood less than a mile away from Arlington House, the Union-occupied estate of Confederate General Robert E. Lee. It remained in use throughout the war.

The lunette was part of the Arlington Line. It tied into Fort Tillinghast approximately 0.6 miles to the north and Fort Albany approximately 0.9 miles to the south. The fortification helped guard the capital from an approach along the Columbia Turnpike and over the Long Bridge on the Potomac River.

== Construction ==
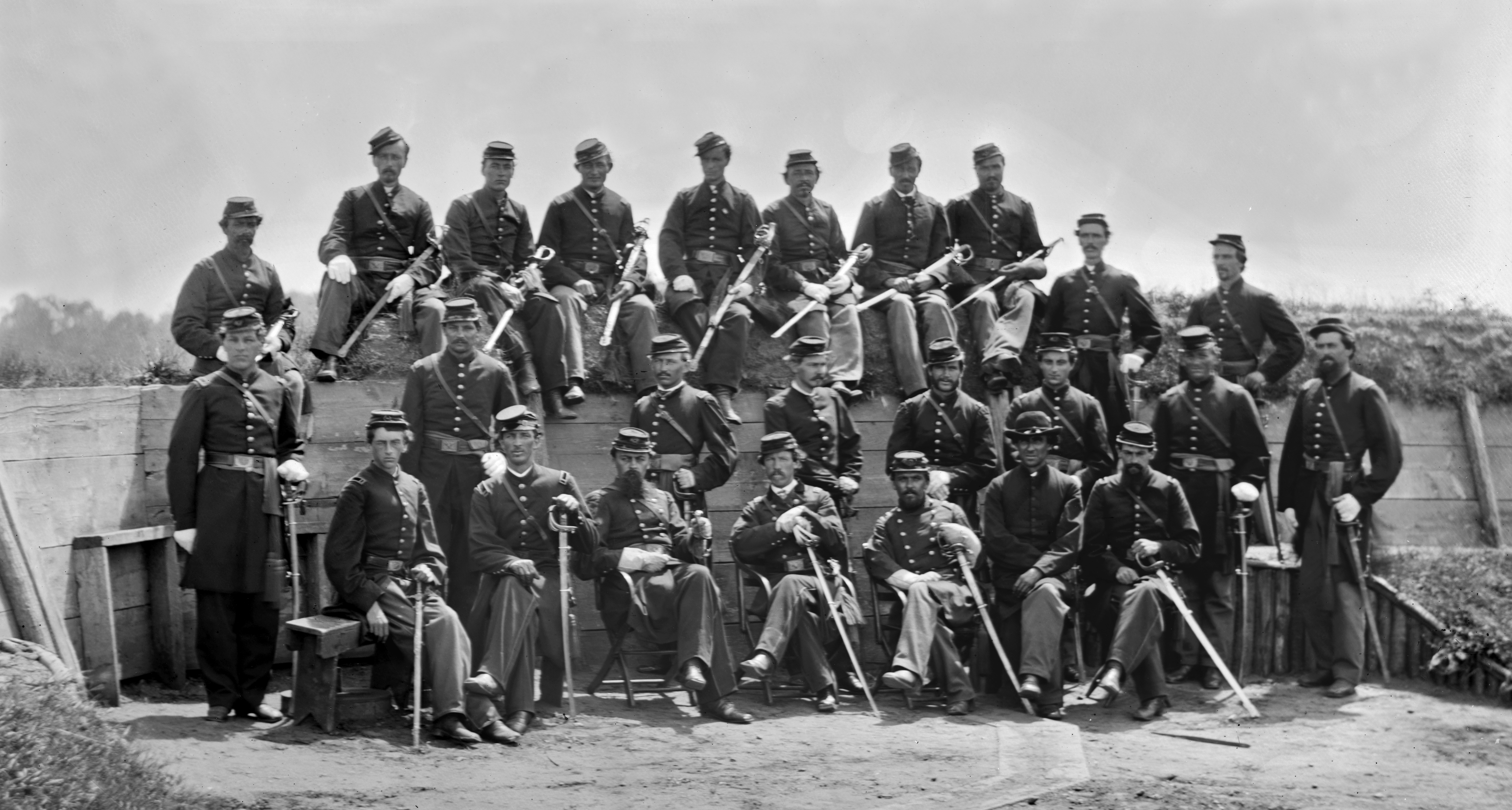
Col. William H. Telford and officers, 50th Regiment Pennsylvania Infantry at Fort Craig, July 1865.

Constructed on local farmland in August 1861, the lunette was named for Lt. Presley O. Craig, 2nd U.S. Artillery Regiment, who was killed at the First Battle of Bull Run on July 21, 1861. Oriented to the southwest, it had a perimeter of 324 yards, emplacements for 11 guns, and 2 magazines. The fort's armament included four 24-pound guns, one 24-pound field howitzer, five 30-pound Parrott rifles, a 10-inch mortar, and a 24-pound Coehorn mortar.

Units garrisoned at the lunette included the 1st Massachusetts Heavy Artillery, 138th Ohio Infantry, 6th Pennsylvania Heavy Artillery, and 16th Maine Infantry.

In June 1865, Fort Craig was ordered dismantled and the site returned to its previous owners. No trace of the lunette remains today in what has become a residential area. A historic marker, near the intersection of South Courthouse Road and 4th Street South in Arlington, shows the location where the lunette once stood. The marker depicts the fort's position on a map of the city's defenses and reads: Here stood Fort Craig, a lunette in the Arlington Line constructed in August 1861. It had a perimeter of 324 yards and emplacements for 11 guns.

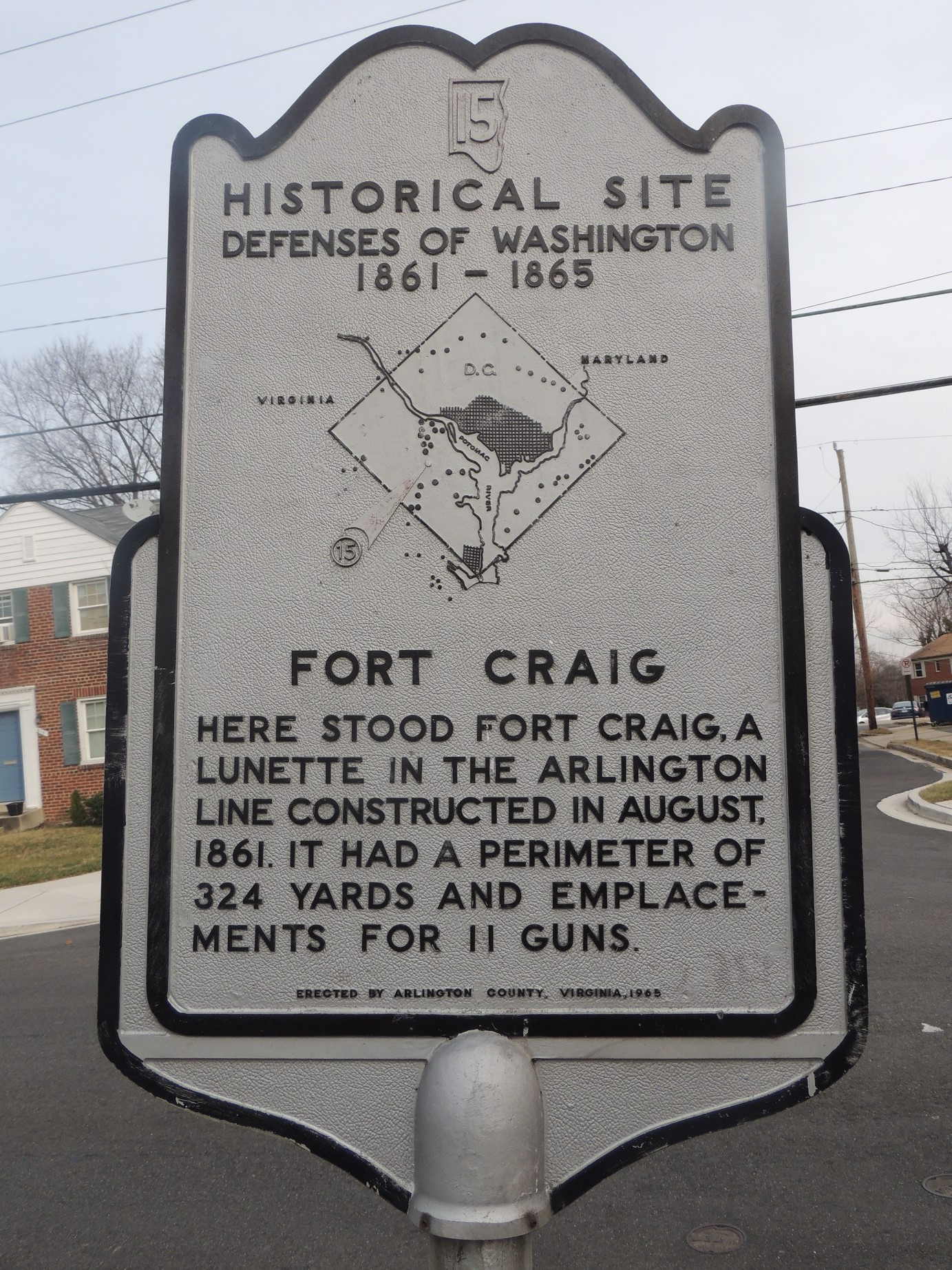
Historical marker at the site of Fort Craig in Arlington, VA (2016)
