= Battle of Peachtree Creek order of battle: Union =

The following Union Army units and commanders fought in the Battle of Peachtree Creek of the American Civil War. The Confederate order of battle is listed separately.

== Abbreviations used ==
=== Military rank ===
- MG = Major General
- BG = Brigadier General
- Col = Colonel
- Cpt = Captain

=== Other ===
- w = wounded
- k = killed

== Army of the Cumberland ==
MG George Henry Thomas

=== IV Corps ===
MG Oliver O. Howard

Division	Brigade	Regiments and Others
First Division; MG David S. Stanley	1st Brigade Col Isaac M. Kirby	21st Illinois; 38th Illinois; 31st Indiana; 81st Indiana; 2nd Kentucky; 90th Ohio; 101st Ohio
First Division; MG David S. Stanley	2nd Brigade Col Jacob E. Taylor	96th Illinois; 115th Illinois; 35th Indiana; 84th Indiana; 21st Kentucky; 40th Ohio; 51st Ohio
First Division; MG David S. Stanley	3rd Brigade Col William Grose	59th Illinois; 75th Illinois; 80th Illinois; 84th Illinois; 9th Indiana; 30th Indiana; 36th Indiana; 77th Pennsylvania
First Division; MG David S. Stanley	Artillery Cpt Theodore Thomasson	5th Indiana Light Battery; Battery B, Pennsylvania Light
Second Division; BG John Newton	1st Brigade BG Nathan Kimball	44th Illinois; 36th Illinois; 73rd Illinois; 88th Illinois; 2nd Missouri; 15th Missouri; 24th Wisconsin
Second Division; BG John Newton	2nd Brigade Col John W. Blake	100th Illinois; 40th Indiana; 57th Indiana; 28th Kentucky; 97th Ohio
Second Division; BG John Newton	3rd Brigade BG Luther P. Bradley	22nd Illinois; 27th Illinois; 42nd Illinois; 51st Illinois; 79th Illinois; 3rd Kentucky; 64th Ohio; 125th Ohio
Second Division; BG John Newton	Artillery Cpt Charles Aleshire; Cpt Wilbur Goodspeed	Battery M, 1st Illinois Light; Battery A, 1st Ohio Light
Third Division; BG Thomas J. Wood	1st Brigade Col William H. Gibson	25th Illinois; 35th Illinois; 89th Illinois; 8th Kansas; 15th Ohio; 49th Ohio; 15th Wisconsin; 124th Ohio
Third Division; BG Thomas J. Wood	2nd Brigade BG William B. Hazen	59th Illinois; 6th Indiana; 5th Kentucky; 6th Kentucky; 23rd Kentucky; 1st Ohio; 6th Ohio; 41st Ohio; 71st Ohio; 93rd Ohio
Third Division; BG Thomas J. Wood	3rd Brigade Col Frederick Knefler	79th Indiana; 86th Indiana; 9th Kentucky; 17th Kentucky; 13th Ohio; 19th Ohio; 59th Ohio
Third Division; BG Thomas J. Wood	Artillery Cpt Cullen Bradley	Bridges' Illinois Light Battery; 6th Ohio Light Battery

=== XIV Corps ===
MG John M. Palmer

Division	Brigade	Regiments and Others
First Division; BG Richard W. Johnson	1st Brigade Col Anson G. McCook	104th Illinois: Ltc Douglas Hapeman; 42nd Indiana; 88th Indiana; 15th Kentucky; 2nd Ohio; 33rd Ohio; 94th Ohio; 10th Wisconsin; 21st Wisconsin: Maj Michael H. Fitch
First Division; BG Richard W. Johnson	2nd Brigade BG John H. King	11th Michigan; 15th U.S. (6 companies); 15th U.S. (9 companies); 16th U.S. (4 companies); 18th U.S. (8 companies); 18th U.S. (4 companies); 19th U.S. (5 companies)
First Division; BG Richard W. Johnson	3rd Brigade Col Marshall F. Moore	37th Indiana; 38th Indiana; 21st Ohio; 74th Ohio; 78th Pennsylvania; 79th Pennsylvania; 1st Wisconsin
First Division; BG Richard W. Johnson	Artillery Cpt Lucius Drury	1st Illinois Light Battery; Battery I, 1st Ohio
Second Division; BG Jefferson C. Davis	1st Brigade BG James D. Morgan	10th Illinois; 16th Illinois; 60th Illinois; 10th Michigan; 14th Michigan; 17th New York
Second Division; BG Jefferson C. Davis	2nd Brigade Col John G. Mitchell	34th Illinois; 78th Illinois; 98th Ohio; 108th Ohio; 113th Ohio; 121st Ohio
Second Division; BG Jefferson C. Davis	3rd Brigade Col Caleb J. Dilworth	85th Illinois; 86th Illinois; 110th Illinois; 125th Illinois; 22nd Indiana; 52nd Ohio
Second Division; BG Jefferson C. Davis	Artillery Cpt Charles Barnett	2nd Illinois Light Artillery, Battery I; 2nd Minnesota Battery (detachment); 5th Wisconsin Light Battery

=== XX Corps ===
MG Joseph Hooker

Division	Brigade	Regiments and Others
First Division; BG Alpheus S. Williams	1st Brigade BG Joseph F. Knipe	5th Connecticut; 3rd Maryland (detachment); 123rd New York; 141st New York; 46th Pennsylvania; 3rd Wisconsin
First Division; BG Alpheus S. Williams	2nd Brigade BG Thomas H. Ruger	27th Indiana; 2nd Massachusetts; 13th New Jersey; 107th New York; 150th New York
First Division; BG Alpheus S. Williams	3rd Brigade Col James S. Robinson	82nd Illinois; 101st Illinois; 45th New York; 143rd New York; 61st Ohio; 82nd Ohio; 31st Wisconsin (Transferred from Nashville, TN, on July 21, 1864.)
First Division; BG Alpheus S. Williams	Artillery Cpt John D. Woodbury	Battery I, 1st New York Light; Battery M, 1st New York Light
Second Division; BG John W. Geary	1st Brigade Col Charles Candy	5th Ohio; 7th Ohio (Mustered out on July 11, 1864.); 29th Ohio; 66th Ohio; 28th Pennsylvania; 147th Pennsylvania
Second Division; BG John W. Geary	2nd Brigade Col Patrick Henry Jones	33rd New Jersey; 119th New York; 134th New York; 154th New York; 73rd Pennsylvania; 109th Pennsylvania
Second Division; BG John W. Geary	3rd Brigade Col David Ireland	60th New York; 102nd New York; 137th New York; 149th New York; 29th Pennsylvania; 111th Pennsylvania: Col George A. Cobham, Jr. (k)
Third Division; BG William T. Ward	1st Brigade Col Benjamin Harrison	102nd Illinois; 105th Illinois; 129th Illinois; 70th Indiana; 79th Ohio
Third Division; BG William T. Ward	2nd Brigade Col John Coburn	33rd Indiana; 85th Indiana; 19th Michigan; 22nd Wisconsin
Third Division; BG William T. Ward	3rd Brigade Col James Wood	20th Connecticut; 33rd Massachusetts; 136th New York; 55th Ohio; 73rd Ohio; 26th Wisconsin
Third Division; BG William T. Ward	Artillery Cpt Marco B. Gary	Battery I, 1st Michigan Light: Cpt Luther R. Smith; Battery C, 1st Ohio Light
Unattached Units	Reserve Brigade Col Heber Le Favour	9th Michigan; 22nd Michigan
Unattached Units	Pontoniers Col George P. Buell	58th Indiana
Unattached Units	Siege Artillery Cpt Arnold Sutermeister	11th Indiana Battery

== Notes ==
- Official Records permanent book link
