= Battle of Franklin (1863) order of battle =

The following Union and Confederate army units and commanders fought in the Battle of Franklin on April 10, 1863. Organization is compiled from the Official Records of the American Civil War.

== Abbreviations used ==
=== Military Rank ===
- Gen = General
- LTG = Lieutenant General
- MG = Major General
- BG = Brigadier General
- Col = Colonel
- Ltc = Lieutenant Colonel
- Maj = Major
- Cpt = Captain
- Lt = Lieutenant

=== Other ===
- w = wounded
- mw = mortally wounded
- k = killed

== Union ==
=== Army of Kentucky ===
MG Gordon Granger

Division	Brigade	Regiments and Others
Baird's Division; BG Absalom Baird	1st Brigade Col John Coburn	33rd Indiana; 85th Indiana; 19th Michigan; 22nd Wisconsin; 9th Ohio Battery
Baird's Division; BG Absalom Baird	2nd Brigade Col Smith D. Atkins	92nd Illinois; 96th Illinois; 115th Illinois; 84th Indiana; 40th Ohio: Cpt Charles G. Matchett; 18th Ohio Battery
Baird's Division; BG Absalom Baird	3rd Brigade Col William P. Reid	78th Illinois: Col William H. Bennison; 98th Ohio: Ltc John S. Pearce; 113th Ohio: Ltc Darius B. Warner; 121st Ohio: Ltc Henry B. Banning; 1st Illinois Artillery, Battery M
Baird's Division; BG Absalom Baird	4th Brigade BG George Crook	11th Ohio; 26th Ohio; 89th Ohio; 92nd Ohio; 18th Kentucky; 21st Indiana Battery
Baird's Division; BG Absalom Baird	Unattached	124th Ohio; 125th Ohio
Gilbert's Division; BG Charles C. Gilbert	Not brigaded	78th Illinois; Further composition unknown
1st Cavalry Division; BG David S. Stanley	1st Brigade Ltc William B. Sipes	4th U.S. Cavalry: Cpt James B. McIntire; 4th Michigan Cavalry: Ltc Josiah B. Parke; 7th Pennsylvania Cavalry: Ltc William B. Sipes; 1st Middle Tennessee Cavalry: Ltc Robert Galbraith; 1st Ohio Battery: Lt Nathaniel M. Newell
1st Cavalry Division; BG David S. Stanley	2nd Brigade Ltc Oliver P. Robie	3rd Indiana Cavalry: Ltc Robert Klein; 3rd Ohio Cavalry; 4th Ohio Cavalry
1st Cavalry Division; BG David S. Stanley	3rd Brigade Col Daniel M. Ray	2nd East Tennessee Cavalry; 4th Indiana Cavalry
Attached cavalry	4th Cavalry Brigade (Dept. of the Cumberland) BG Green Clay Smith	4th Kentucky Cavalry; 6th Kentucky Cavalry: Col Louis D. Watkins; 2nd Michigan Cavalry; 9th Pennsylvania Cavalry: Col Thomas J. Jordan

== Confederate ==
=== Cavalry Corps, Army of Tennessee ===
MG Earl Van Dorn

Brigade	Regiments and Other
First Brigade BG Frank Armstrong	3rd Arkansas Cavalry; 4th Mississippi Cavalry; 1st Tennessee Cavalry; Sanders’ Tennessee Cavalry Battalion; Escort (James H. Polk's Mississippi Company)
Second Brigade Col James W. Starnes	3rd Tennessee Cavalry; 9th Tennessee Cavalry; Escort (Detachment, 3rd Tennessee Cavalry)
Unattached	Freeman's Tennessee (Horse Artillery) Battery; Forrest's Tennessee Escort
