= List of Ohio units in the American Civil War =

During the American Civil War, nearly 320,000 Ohioans served in the Union Army, more than any other Northern state except New York and Pennsylvania. Of these, 5,092 were free blacks. Ohio had the highest percentage of population enlisted in the military of any state. Sixty percent of all the men between the ages of 18 and 45 were in the service. Ohio mustered 230 regiments of infantry and cavalry, as well as 25 light artillery batteries and 5 independent companies of sharpshooters. Total casualties among these units numbered 35,475 men, more than 10% of all the Buckeyes in uniform during the war. There were 6,835 men killed in action, including 402 officers.

== Volunteer infantry regiments ==
- 1st Ohio Infantry
- 2nd Ohio Infantry
- 3rd Ohio Infantry
- 4th Ohio Infantry
- 5th Ohio Infantry
- 6th Ohio Infantry
- 7th Ohio Infantry
- 8th Ohio Infantry
- 9th Ohio Infantry
- 10th Ohio Infantry
- 11th Ohio Infantry
- 12th Ohio Infantry
- 13th Ohio Infantry
- 14th Ohio Infantry
- 15th Ohio Infantry
- 16th Ohio Infantry
- 17th Ohio Infantry
- 18th Ohio Infantry
- 19th Ohio Infantry
- 20th Ohio Infantry
- 21st Ohio Infantry
- 22nd Ohio Infantry
- 23rd Ohio Infantry
- 24th Ohio Infantry
- 25th Ohio Infantry
- 26th Ohio Infantry
- 27th Ohio Infantry
- 28th Ohio Infantry
- 29th Ohio Infantry
- 30th Ohio Infantry
- 31st Ohio Infantry
- 32nd Ohio Infantry
- 33rd Ohio Infantry
- 34th Ohio Infantry
- 35th Ohio Infantry
- 36th Ohio Infantry
- 37th Ohio Infantry
- 38th Ohio Infantry
- 39th Ohio Infantry
- 40th Ohio Infantry
- 41st Ohio Infantry

- 42nd Ohio Infantry
- 43rd Ohio Infantry
- 44th Ohio Infantry
- 45th Ohio Infantry
- 46th Ohio Infantry
- 47th Ohio Infantry
- 48th Ohio Infantry
- 49th Ohio Infantry
- 50th Ohio Infantry
- 51st Ohio Infantry
- 52nd Ohio Infantry
- 53rd Ohio Infantry
- 54th Ohio Infantry
- 55th Ohio Infantry
- 56th Ohio Infantry
- 57th Ohio Infantry
- 58th Ohio Infantry
- 59th Ohio Infantry
- 60th Ohio Infantry
- 61st Ohio Infantry
- 62nd Ohio Infantry
- 63rd Ohio Infantry
- 64th Ohio Infantry
- 65th Ohio Infantry
- 66th Ohio Infantry
- 67th Ohio Infantry
- 68th Ohio Infantry
- 69th Ohio Infantry
- 70th Ohio Infantry
- 71st Ohio Infantry
- 72nd Ohio Infantry
- 73rd Ohio Infantry
- 74th Ohio Infantry
- 75th Ohio Infantry
- 76th Ohio Infantry
- 77th Ohio Infantry
- 78th Ohio Infantry
- 79th Ohio Infantry
- 80th Ohio Infantry
- 81st Ohio Infantry
- 82nd Ohio Infantry

- 83rd Ohio Infantry
- 84th Ohio Infantry
- 85th Ohio Infantry
- 86th Ohio Infantry
- 87th Ohio Infantry
- 88th Ohio Infantry
- 89th Ohio Infantry
- 90th Ohio Infantry
- 91st Ohio Infantry
- 92nd Ohio Infantry
- 93rd Ohio Infantry
- 94th Ohio Infantry
- 95th Ohio Infantry
- 96th Ohio Infantry
- 97th Ohio Infantry
- 98th Ohio Infantry
- 99th Ohio Infantry
- 100th Ohio Infantry
- 101st Ohio Infantry
- 102nd Ohio Infantry
- 103rd Ohio Infantry
- 104th Ohio Infantry
- 105th Ohio Infantry
- 106th Ohio Infantry
- 107th Ohio Infantry
- 108th Ohio Infantry
- 109th Ohio Infantry-failed to complete organization; men transferred to 113th OVI
- 110th Ohio Infantry
- 111th Ohio Infantry
- 113th Ohio Infantry
- 114th Ohio Infantry
- 115th Ohio Infantry
- 116th Ohio Infantry
- 117th Ohio Infantry
- 118th Ohio Infantry

- 119th Ohio Infantry-failed to complete organization: men transferred to 124th OVI
- 120th Ohio Infantry
- 121st Ohio Infantry
- 122nd Ohio Infantry
- 123rd Ohio Infantry
- 124th Ohio Infantry
- 125th Ohio Infantry
- 126th Ohio Infantry
- 127th Ohio Infantry See 5th Regiment United States Colored Troops
- 128th Ohio Infantry
- 129th Ohio Infantry
- 130th Ohio Infantry
- 131st Ohio Infantry
- 132nd Ohio Infantry
- 133rd Ohio Infantry
- 134th Ohio Infantry
- 135th Ohio Infantry
- 136th Ohio Infantry
- 137th Ohio Infantry
- 138th Ohio Infantry
- 139th Ohio Infantry
- 140th Ohio Infantry
- 141st Ohio Infantry
- 142nd Ohio Infantry
- 143rd Ohio Infantry
- 144th Ohio Infantry
- 145th Ohio Infantry
- 146th Ohio Infantry
- 147th Ohio Infantry
- 148th Ohio Infantry
- 149th Ohio Infantry
- 150th Ohio Infantry
- 151st Ohio Infantry
- 152nd Ohio Infantry
- 153rd Ohio Infantry
- 154th Ohio Infantry
- 155th Ohio Infantry
- 156th Ohio Infantry

- 157th Ohio Infantry
- 159th Ohio Infantry
- 160th Ohio Infantry
- 161st Ohio Infantry
- 162nd Ohio Infantry
- 163rd Ohio Infantry
- 164th Ohio Infantry
- 165th Ohio Infantry
- 166th Ohio Infantry
- 167th Ohio Infantry
- 168th Ohio Infantry
- 169th Ohio Infantry
- 170th Ohio Infantry
- 171st Ohio Infantry
- 172nd Ohio Infantry
- 173rd Ohio Infantry
- 174th Ohio Infantry
- 175th Ohio Infantry
- 176th Ohio Infantry
- 177th Ohio Infantry
- 178th Ohio Infantry
- 179th Ohio Infantry
- 180th Ohio Infantry
- 181st Ohio Infantry
- 182nd Ohio Infantry
- 183rd Ohio Infantry
- 184th Ohio Infantry
- 185th Ohio Infantry
- 186th Ohio Infantry
- 187th Ohio Infantry
- 188th Ohio Infantry
- 189th Ohio Infantry
- 190th Ohio Infantry-failed to complete organization
- 191st Ohio Infantry
- 192nd Ohio Infantry
- 193rd Ohio Infantry
- 194th Ohio Infantry
- 195th Ohio Infantry
- 196th Ohio Infantry
- 197th Ohio Infantry
- 198th Ohio Infantry

== Volunteer cavalry regiments ==
- 1st Ohio Cavalry
- 2nd Ohio Cavalry
- 3rd Ohio Cavalry
- 4th Ohio Cavalry

- 5th Ohio Cavalry
- 6th Ohio Cavalry
- 7th Ohio Cavalry
- 8th Ohio Cavalry
- 9th Ohio Cavalry
- 10th Ohio Cavalry
- 11th Ohio Cavalry
- 12th Ohio Cavalry
- 13th Ohio Cavalry

== Volunteer artillery ==
=== Ohio Independent Artillery Batteries ===
- 1st Ohio Battery
- 2nd Ohio Battery
- 3rd Ohio Battery
- 4th Ohio Battery
- 5th Ohio Battery
- 6th Ohio Battery
- 7th Ohio Battery
- 8th Ohio Battery
- 9th Ohio Battery

- 10th Ohio Battery
- 11th Ohio Battery
- 12th Ohio Battery
- 13th Ohio Battery
- 14th Ohio Battery
- 15th Ohio Battery
- 16th Ohio Battery
- 17th Ohio Battery
- 18th Ohio Battery

- 19th Ohio Battery
- 20th Ohio Battery
- 21st Ohio Battery
- 22nd Ohio Battery
- 23rd Ohio Battery
- 24th Ohio Battery
- 25th Ohio Battery
- 26th Ohio Battery
- Paulsen's Independent Battery

=== 1st Ohio Light Artillery ===
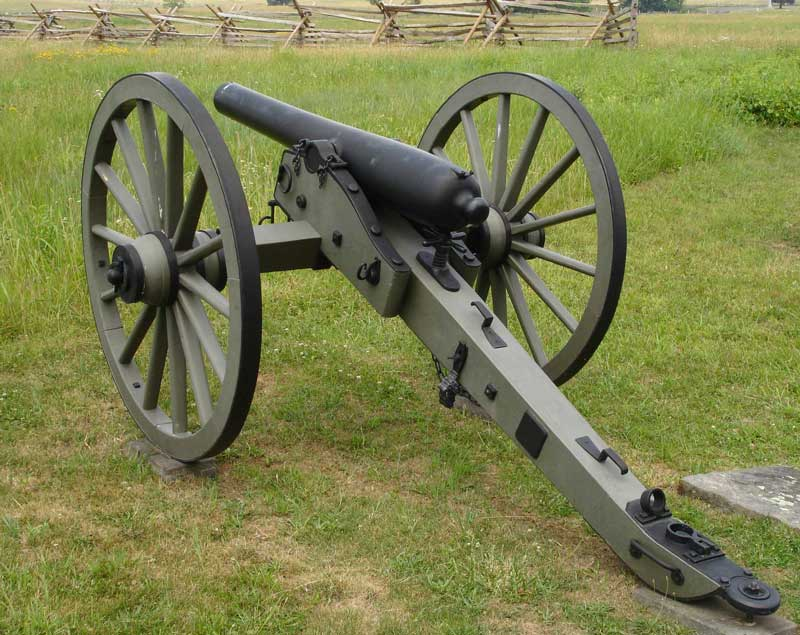
3-Inch Ordnance Rifle similar to those used by several Ohio batteries during the war

- Battery A, 1st Ohio Light Artillery
- Battery B, 1st Ohio Light Artillery
- Battery C, 1st Ohio Light Artillery
- Battery D, 1st Ohio Light Artillery
- Battery E, 1st Ohio Light Artillery
- Battery F, 1st Ohio Light Artillery
- Battery G, 1st Ohio Light Artillery
- Battery H, 1st Ohio Light Artillery
- Battery I, 1st Ohio Light Artillery
- Battery K, 1st Ohio Light Artillery
- Battery L, 1st Ohio Light Artillery
- Battery M, 1st Ohio Light Artillery

=== Ohio Heavy Artillery Regiments ===
- 1st Ohio Heavy Artillery
- 2nd Ohio Heavy Artillery

== Other Ohio Volunteer Infantry Units ==
- Black Brigade of Cincinnati
- 1st Battalion Ohio Sharpshooters
- 1st Independent Company Sharpshooters
- 2nd Independent Company Sharpshooters
- 3rd Independent Company Sharpshooters
- 4th Independent Company Sharpshooters
- 5th Independent Company Sharpshooters
- 6th Independent Company Sharpshooters
- 7th Independent Company Sharpshooters [Sherman's Bodyguard]
- 8th Independent Company Sharpshooters
- 9th Independent Company Sharpshooters
- 10th Independent Company Sharpshooters
- Captain Bard's Company
- Dennison Guards
- Trumbull Guards
- Wallace Guards
- Departmental Corps

== Other Ohio Volunteer Cavalry Units ==
- 1st Independent Battalion Cavalry, later 11th Ohio Cavalry
- 2nd Independent Battalion Cavalry
- 3rd Independent Battalion Cavalry
- 4th Independent Battalion Cavalry
- 5th Independent Battalion Cavalry
- McLaughlin's Independent Squadron Cavalry
- Blazer's Scouts
- 3rd Independent Company Cavalry
- 4th Independent Company Cavalry
- 5th Independent Company Cavalry
- 6th Independent Company Cavalry
- Burdsell's Independent Company Cavalry
- George's Independent Company Cavalry
- Ironton Independent Company Cavalry
- Harlan Light Cavalry
- Union Light Guard

== See also ==
- Lists of American Civil War Regiments by State
- Ohio in the American Civil War
- List of Ohio's American Civil War generals
