= 13th Ohio Independent Light Artillery Battery =

13th Ohio Battery Myers Battery
- Active: February 15, 1862, to April 20, 1862
- Country: United States
- Allegiance: Union
- Branch: Artillery
- Equipment: 2-6 pounder bronze field guns, 4-6 pounder James Rifles
- Engagements: Battle of Shiloh

13th Ohio Battery was an artillery battery that served in the Union Army during the American Civil War.

== Service ==
The 13th Ohio Battery was organized and mustered into Federal Service on February 15, 1862, at Camp Dennison near Cincinnati, Ohio, with Captain John B Myers commanding, for a three-year enlistment. It was mainly recruited in the counties of Logan, Union, Champaign, Hardin & Shelby. It was attached to 4th Division, Army of the Tennessee Commanded by Brigadier General Stephen A. Hurlbut. NOTE: Both the books by Reid & Dyer List the battery as not fully formed and only a section fought at Shiloh, this is an error, the battery was fully formed and had its six guns plus 5 officers and 135 men.

On the first day of the Battle of Shiloh (April 6, 1862), the battery was positioned in the Peach Orchard Field, while the battery was coming on line, it was struck by enemy fire. Sergeant David Skeen Price (Sergeant of Gun #2) was killed instantly when a cannonball struck him in the shoulder throwing him off his horse, a second round struck a caisson and it exploded causing the horses to bolt. five of the batteries six guns were captured. The sixth gun was taken back to Pittsburg Landing, Tennessee, where it was brought together with other guns and was fired the rest of the battle. The five captured guns were recovered on April 7. The battery as a whole did not engage in the rest of the battle. The organization of the battery was disbanded April 20, 1862, by Army of the Tennessee Special Field Order #17 issued by Major General Henry Halleck. The men were transferred to the 7th Ohio Battery, 10th Ohio Battery, or 14th Ohio Battery, and the officers were mustered out of the service, with the exception of Lieutenant Ezra Bennett, who was at the hospital during the battle. He was reassigned to the 14th Ohio Battery. The Lieutenant Governor of Ohio Benjamin Stanton was at the battle and witnessed the aftermath, he was also a friend of Capt. Myers and published an article criticizing the conduct of the generals at the battle.

== Casualties ==
The battery lost a total of 20 enlisted men during service; 3 enlisted men killed or mortally wounded, 17 enlisted men died due to disease.

== Commanders ==
- Captain John Blymier Myers

== See also ==
- List of Ohio Civil War units
- Ohio in the Civil War
