= 118th Ohio Infantry Regiment =

- Active: August 1862 to June 24, 1865
- Country: United States
- Allegiance: Union
- Branch: Infantry
- Engagements: Atlanta campaign; Battle of Resaca; Battle of Dallas; Battle of New Hope Church; Battle of Allatoona; Battle of Kennesaw Mountain; Siege of Atlanta; Battle of Jonesboro; Franklin-Nashville Campaign; Battle of Franklin; Battle of Nashville; Carolinas campaign; Battle of Wilmington

The 118th Ohio Infantry Regiment, sometimes 118th Ohio Volunteer Infantry (or 118th OVI) was an infantry regiment in the Union Army during the American Civil War.

== Service ==
The 118th Ohio Infantry was organized Lima, Mansfield, and Cincinnati, Ohio August through September 1862 and mustered in at Cincinnati for three years service under the command of Colonel Samuel R. Mott.

The regiment was attached to 2nd Brigade, 2nd Division, Army of Kentucky, Department of the Ohio, September to November 1862. 1st Brigade, 1st Division, Army of Kentucky, November 1862. District of Central Kentucky, Department of the Ohio, to June 1863. 2nd Brigade, 4th Division, XXIII Corps, Department of the Ohio, to July 1863. 2nd Brigade, 1st Division, XXIII Corps, to August 1863. 1st Brigade, 2nd Division, XXIII Corps, to April 1864. 2nd Brigade, 2nd Division, XXIII Corps, Army of the Ohio, to February 1865, and Department of North Carolina to June 1865.

The 118th Ohio Infantry mustered out of service June 24, 1865, at Salisbury, North Carolina. Company K, whose term of service had not expired, was transferred to the 183rd Ohio Infantry.

== Detailed service ==
Ordered to Kentucky and assigned to duty as guard along Kentucky Central Railroad from Buston's Station to Paris, Ky., September 1862 to August 1863. Skirmish at Paris, Ky., July 29, 1863 (detachment). Burnside's Campaign in eastern Tennessee August 16-October 17, 1863. Duty at Kingston until December 6. Action at Kingston November 24, and near Kingston December 4. Moved to Nashville December 5; then marched to Blain's Cross Roads and Mossy Creek. Action at Mossy Creek December 29. Operations in eastern Tennessee December 1863 to April 1864. Atlanta Campaign May 1 to September 8. Demonstrations on Dalton May 9–13. Battle of Resaca May 14–15. Advance on Dallas May 18–25. Operations on line of Pumpkin Vine Creek and battles about Dallas, New Hope Church, and Allatoona Hills May 25-June 5. Operations about Marietta and against Kennesaw Mountain June 10-July 2. Lost Mountain June 15–17. Muddy Creek June 17. Noyes Creek June 19. Kolb's Farm June 22. Assault on Kennesaw June 27. Nickajack Creek July 2–5. Chattahoochie River July 5–17. Decatur July 19. Howard House July 20. Siege of Atlanta July 22-August 25. Utoy Creek August 5–7. Flank movement on Jonesboro August 25–30. Battle of Jonesboro August 31-September 1 (reserve). Lovejoy's Station September 2–6. Operations against Hood in northern Georgia and northern Alabama September 29-November 3. Nashville Campaign November–December. Columbia, Duck River, November 24–27. Battle of Franklin November 30. Battle of Nashville December 15–16. Pursuit of Hood to the Tennessee River December 17–28. At Clifton, Tenn., until January 16, 1865. Movement to Washington, D.C., then to Fort Fisher, N.C., January 16-February 9. Operations against Hoke February 11–14. Fort Anderson February 18–19. Town Creek February 19–20. Capture of Wilmington February 22. Campaign of the Carolinas March 1-April 26. Advance on Goldsboro March 21. Advance on Raleigh April 10–14. Occupation of Raleigh April 14. Bennett's House April 26. Surrender of Johnston and his army. Duty at Raleigh, Greensboro and Salisbury until June.

== Casualties ==
The regiment lost a total of 184 men during service; 1 officer and 55 enlisted men killed or mortally wounded, 1 officer and 127 enlisted men died of disease.

== Commanders ==
- Colonel Samuel R. Mott - resigned February 10, 1864
- Colonel Thomas Lowry Young - discharged due to illness, September 14, 1864
- Colonel Carl Edgar Sowers

== Notable members ==
- Colonel Thomas Lowry Young - 33rd governor of Ohio, 1877–1878; U.S. Representative from Ohio, 1879–1883

== See also ==
- List of Ohio Civil War units
- Ohio in the Civil War
