= 179th Regiment =

179th Regiment may refer to:

- 179th Field Regiment, Royal Artillery
- 179th Infantry Regiment (United States)

== American Civil War regiments ==
- 179th New York Infantry Regiment
- 179th Ohio Infantry Regiment
