= 176th Regiment =

176th Regiment may refer to:

- 176th Field Regiment, Royal Artillery
- 176th Guards Fighter Aviation Regiment
- 176th Perevolochna Infantry Regiment
- 176th Infantry Regiment (United States)

== American Civil War regiments ==
- 176th New York Infantry Regiment
- 176th Ohio Infantry Regiment
