= 17th Ohio Independent Light Artillery Battery =

17th Ohio Battery
- Active: August 21, 1862, to August 16, 1865
- Country: United States
- Allegiance: Union
- Branch: Artillery
- Engagements: Defense of Cincinnati; Yazoo Pass Expedition; Battle of Chickasaw Bayou; Battle of Arkansas Post; Battle of Port Gibson; Battle of Champion Hill; Siege of Vicksburg, May 19 & May 22 assaults Siege of Jackson; Battle of Grand Coteau; Battle of Fort Gaines; Battle of Fort Morgan; Battle of Fort Blakeley

17th Ohio Battery was an artillery battery that served in the Union Army during the American Civil War.

== Service ==
The 17th Ohio Battery was organized in Dayton, Ohio, and mustered in August 21, 1862, for a three-year enlistment under Captain Ambrose A. Blount.

The battery was attached to Artillery, 1st Division, Army of Kentucky, Department of the Ohio, to October 1862. Unattached, Army of Kentucky, Department of the Ohio, Lexington, Kentucky, to November 1862. Artillery, 10th Division, XIII Corps, Department of the Tennessee, to December 1862. Artillery, 1st Division, Sherman's Yazoo Expedition, to January 1863. Artillery, 10th Division, XIII Corps, Army of the Tennessee, to August 1863. 2nd Brigade, 4th Division, XIII Corps, Department of the Gulf, to June 1864. Defenses of New Orleans, Louisiana, to August 1864. United States Forces, Mobile Bay, Department of the Gulf, to September 1864. Unattached Artillery, XIX Corps, Department of the Gulf, to December 1864. Unattached, Artillery Reserve Corps, Military Division West Mississippi, to February 1865. Artillery Brigade, XVI Corps, Military Division West Mississippi, to July 1865.

The 17th Ohio Battery mustered out of service on August 16, 1865.

== Detailed service ==
Ordered to Covington, Ky., September 3. Duty at Covington, Ky., during threatened attack on Cincinnati by Edmund Kirby Smith. March to Lexington, Ky., then to Louisville, Ky., and duty there until December 1. Ordered to Memphis, Tenn., December 1. Sherman's Yazoo Expedition December 20, 1862, to January 3, 1863. Expedition from Milliken's Bend to Dallas Station and Delhi December 25–26. Chickasaw Bayou December 26–28. Chickasaw Bluff December 29. Expedition to Arkansas Post, Ark., January 3–10, 1863. Assault on and capture of Fort Hindman, Arkansas Post, January 10–11. Moved to Young's Point, La., January 15. Expedition to Greenville, Miss., and Cypress Bend, Ark., February 14–26. Action at Cypress Bend February 19. Moved to Milliken's Bend March 8. Movement on Bruinsburg, Mississippi, and turning Grand Gulf April 25–30. Battle of Port Gibson May 1. Battle of Champion Hill May 16. Siege of Vicksburg, Miss., May 18-July 4. Assaults on Vicksburg May 19 and 22. Advance on Jackson July 5–10. Siege of Jackson, Miss., July 10–17. Assault on Jackson July 12. Duty at Vicksburg until August 20. Ordered to New Orleans, La., and duty there until September 5. At Brashear City until October 3. Expedition to New and Amite Rivers September 24–29. Western Louisiana ("Teche") Campaign October 3-November 30. Grand Coteau November 3. Moved to New Orleans, La., and duty there until August 1864. Operations in Mobile Bay against Forts Gaines and Morgan August 2–23. Siege and capture of Fort Gaines August 3–8. Siege and capture of Fort Morgan August 10–23. Duty at New Orleans until March 1865. Campaign against Mobile, Ala., and its defenses March 17-April 12. Siege of Spanish Fort and Fort Blakely March 26-April 8. Assault and capture of Fort Blakely April 9. Occupation of Mobile April 12. March to Montgomery April 13–25. Duty at Montgomery and Selma, Ala., until July. Ordered home for muster out.

== Casualties ==
The battery lost a total of 44 men during service; 1 enlisted man killed, 1 officer and 42 enlisted men died due to disease.

== Commanders ==
- Captain Ambrose A. Blount
- Captain Charles S. Rice

== See also ==
- List of Ohio Civil War units
- Ohio in the Civil War
