= 24th Ohio Independent Light Artillery Battery =

24th Ohio Battery
- Active: August 4, 1863, to June 24, 1865
- Country: United States
- Allegiance: Union
- Branch: Artillery

24th Ohio Battery was an artillery battery that served in the Union Army during the American Civil War.

== Service ==
The 24th Ohio Battery was organized at Camp Dennison near Cincinnati, Ohio and mustered in for three years service on August 24, 1863, under the command of Captain John L. Hill.

The battery was ordered to Cincinnati, September 22, then moved to Johnson's Island, Sandusky Bay, Ohio, November 10, and served guard duty there until August 6, 1864. Moved to Camp Chase August 6, then to Camp Douglas, Chicago, Illinois, August 27, and served guard duty there June 10, 1865.

The 24th Ohio Battery mustered out of service on June 24, 1865, at Camp Dennison.

== Casualties ==
The battery lost a total of 6 men during service, all due to disease.

== Commanders ==
- Captain John L. Hill

== See also ==
- List of Ohio Civil War units
- Ohio in the Civil War
