= 187th Ohio Infantry Regiment =

- Active: March 2, 1865, to January 20, 1866
- Country: United States
- Allegiance: Union
- Branch: Infantry

The 187th Ohio Infantry Regiment, sometimes 187th Ohio Volunteer Infantry (or 187th OVI) was an infantry regiment in the Union Army during the American Civil War.

== Service ==
The 187th Ohio Infantry was organized at Camp Chase in Columbus, Ohio, and mustered in for one year service on March 2, 1865, under the command of Colonel Andrew R. Z. Dawson.

The regiment was left Ohio for Nashville, Tennessee, March 3, 1865. Served provost duty at Nashville, Dalton, and Macon, Georgia, until January 1866. Attached to 1st Brigade, 2nd Separate Division, District of the Etowah, and Department of Georgia.

The 187th Ohio Infantry mustered out of service January 20, 1866.

== Casualties ==
The regiment lost a total of 54 men during service; 1 enlisted man killed and 1 officer and 52 enlisted men due to disease.

== Commanders ==
- Colonel Andrew R. Z. Dawson

== See also ==
- List of Ohio Civil War units
- Ohio in the Civil War
