= 175th Ohio Infantry Regiment =

- Active: October 11, 1864, to June 27, 1865
- Country: United States
- Allegiance: Union
- Branch: Infantry
- Engagements: Franklin-Nashville Campaign; Battle of Franklin; Battle of Nashville

The 175th Ohio Infantry Regiment, sometimes 175th Ohio Volunteer Infantry (or 175th OVI) was an infantry regiment in the Union Army during the American Civil War.

== Service ==
The 175th Ohio Infantry was organized at Camp Dennison near Cincinnati, Ohio, and mustered in for one year service on October 11, 1864, under the command of Colonel Daniel W. McCoy. Companies I and K were mustered in at Camp Chase in Columbus, Ohio.

The regiment was attached to 3rd Brigade, 3rd Division, XXIII Corps, Army of the Ohio, to December 1864. Post of Columbia, Tennessee, Department of the Cumberland, to March 1865. 2nd Sub-District, District of Middle Tennessee, to June 1865.

The 175th Ohio Infantry mustered out of service on June 27, 1865, at Nashville, Tennessee.

== Detailed service ==
Left Ohio for Nashville, Tennessee, October 11; then moved to Columbia, Tennessee, October 20, and assigned to post and garrison duty there, also guarding the Tennessee & Alabama Railroad until November 24. Nashville Campaign November 24-December 28. Columbia, Duck River, November 24–27. Battle of Franklin November 30. Occupation of Nashville during Hood's investment December 1–15. Battle of Nashville December 15–16. Occupation of Fort Negley until December 25. Ordered to Columbia, Tenn., December 25, and garrison duty there until June 1865. Moved to Nashville, Tenn., June 23.

== Casualties ==
The regiment lost a total of 124 men during service; 1 officer and 15 enlisted men killed or mortally wounded, 2 officers and 106 enlisted men due to disease.

== Commanders ==
- Colonel Daniel W. McCoy

== See also ==
- List of Ohio Civil War units
- Ohio in the Civil War
