= 181st Ohio Infantry Regiment =

- Active: October 10, 1864, to July 29, 1865
- Country: United States
- Allegiance: Union
- Branch: Infantry
- Engagements: Carolinas campaign

The 181st Ohio Infantry Regiment, sometimes 181st Ohio Volunteer Infantry (or 181st OVI) was an infantry regiment in the Union Army during the American Civil War.

== Service ==
The 181st Ohio Infantry was organized at Camp Dennison near Cincinnati, Ohio, and mustered in for one year service on October 10, 1864, under the command of Colonel John O'Dowd.

The regiment was attached to District of Northern Alabama October 1864. 1st Brigade, Defenses Nashville & Chattanooga Railroad, to January 1865. 3rd Brigade, 2nd Division, XXIII Corps, Army of the Ohio and Department of North Carolina, to July 1865.

The 181st Ohio Infantry mustered out of service July 29, 1865, at Salisbury, North Carolina.

== Detailed service ==
Left Ohio for Huntsville, Ala., October 24. Duty at Huntsville and Decatur, Ala., until November 1864. Moved to Murfreesboro, Tenn., November 30. Siege of Murfreesboro December 5–12. Wilkinson's Pike, near Murfreesboro, December 7 and December 13–14. Duty at Murfreesboro until December 24. Moved to Columbia, Tenn., December 24. Movement to Washington, D.C., then to Fort Fisher, N.C., January 15 to February 9, 1865. Operations against Hoke February 11–14. Capture of Wilmington February 22. Campaign of the Carolinas March 1-April 26. Advance on Goldsboro March 6–21. Occupation of Goldsboro March 21. Advance on Raleigh April 10–14. Occupation of Raleigh April 14. Bennett's House April 26. Surrender of Johnston and his army. Duty at Raleigh, Greensboro and Salisbury until July.

== Casualties ==
The regiment lost a total of 33 men during service; 5 enlisted men killed or mortally wounded, 1 officer and 27 enlisted men due to disease.

== Commanders ==
- Colonel John O'Dowd
- Colonel John E. Hudson

== See also ==
- List of Ohio Civil War units
- Ohio in the Civil War
