= Battery L, 1st Ohio Light Artillery =

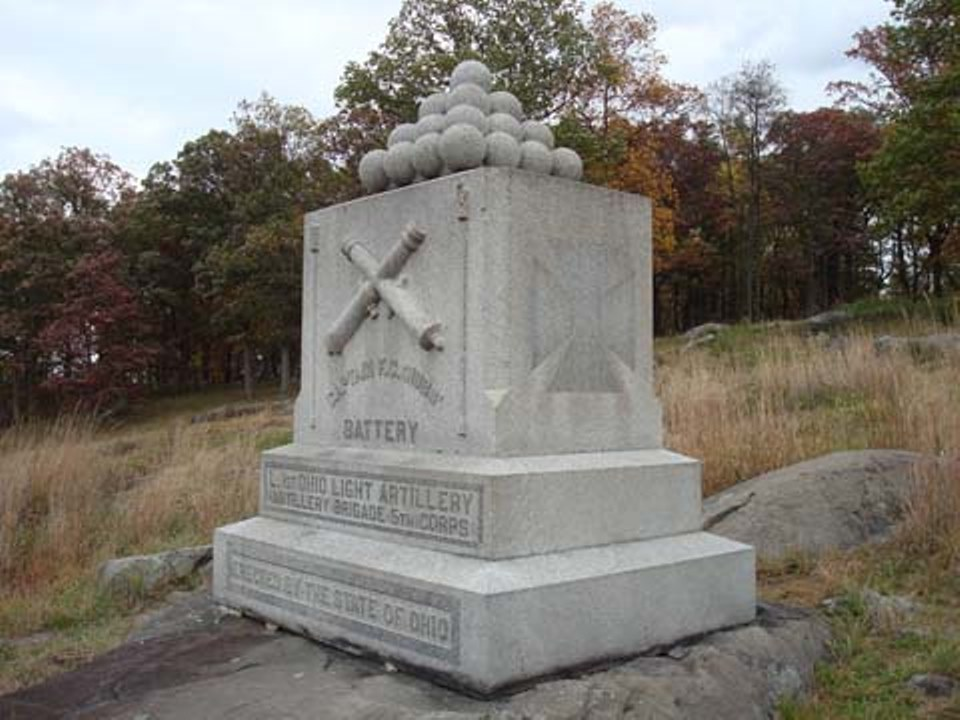
- Active: October 8, 1861 – July 4, 1865
- Country: United States
- Allegiance: Union
- Branch: Artillery
- Engagements: First Battle of Winchester; Battle of Fredericksburg; Battle of Chancellorsville; Battle of Gettysburg; Bristoe Campaign; Mine Run Campaign; Battle of Fort Stevens; Sheridan's Shenandoah Valley Campaign; Third Battle of Winchester; Battle of Cedar Creek

Battery L, 1st Ohio Light Artillery was an artillery battery that served in the Union Army during the American Civil War.

== Service ==
The battery was organized in Portsmouth, Ohio on October 8, 1861 and mustered in at Camp Dennison near Cincinnati, Ohio for a three-year enlistment on January 20, 1862. The regiment was organized as early as 1860 under Ohio's militia laws, under Colonel James Barnett.

The battery was attached to Landers' Division, Army of the Potomac, to March 1862. Artillery, Shields' 2nd Division, Banks' V Corps and Department of the Shenandoah to May 1862. Artillery, Shields' Division, Department of the Rappahannock, to June 1862. Alexandria, Virginia, Military District of Washington, D.C., to September 1862. Artillery, 3rd Division, V Corps, Army of the Potomac, to October 1862. Artillery, 2nd Division, V Corps, to May 1863. Artillery Brigade, V Corps, to April 1864. Camp Barry, Defenses of Washington, D.C.. XXII Corps, to May 1864. 2nd Brigade, Hardin's Division, XXII Corps, to July 1864. Artillery, 1st Division, XIX Corps, Middle Military Division, to August 1864. Reserve Division, Department of West Virginia, to September 1864. Artillery Brigade, Department of West Virginia, to January 1865. 1st Separate Brigade. 3rd Division, West Virginia, to April 1865. Artillery, 2nd Division, Department of West Virginia, to July 1865.

Battery L, 1st Ohio Light Artillery mustered out of service at Columbus, Ohio on July 4, 1865.

== Detailed service ==
Moved to Patterson's Creek, Va., January 20–27, 1862. Advance on Winchester, Va., March 7–15, 1862. Reconnaissance to Strasburg March 19–20. Battle of Winchester March 23. Occupation of Mt. Jackson April 17. March to Fredericksburg May 12–21, and return to Front Royal May 25–30. Moved to Alexandria June 29, and duty in the defenses of Washington until September. Movement to Falmouth, Va., October–November. Battle of Fredericksburg December 12–15. At Falmouth until April. 1863. Chancellorsville Campaign April 27 – May 6. Battle of Chancellorsville May 1–5. Gettysburg Campaign June 11 – July 24. Battle of Gettysburg July 1–3. Duty on line of the Rappahannock and Rapidan until October. Bristoe Campaign October 9–22. Advance to line of the Rappahannock November 7–8. Rappahannock Station November 7. Mine Run Campaign November 26 – December 2. Duty at Camp Barry and at Forts Sumner and Kearney, Defenses of Washington, until July 1864. Repulse of Early's attack on Washington July 11–12. Expedition to Snicker's Gap July 14–23. Sheridan's Shenandoah Valley Campaign. Berryville September 3. Battle of Opequan, Winchester, September 19. Fisher's Hill September 22. Battle of Cedar Creek October 19. Duty at Winchester until December 28, and at New Creek until June 30, 1865. Ordered to Columbus, Ohio, June 30.

== Casualties ==
The battery lost a total of 24 men during service; 1 officer and 7 enlisted men killed or mortally wounded, 1 officer and 15 enlisted men died of disease.

== Commanders ==
- Captain Franklin C. Gibbs
- Lieutenant Frederick Dorries – commanded at the Battle of Fredericksburg

== See also ==
- List of Ohio Civil War units
- Ohio in the Civil War
