= 85th Ohio Infantry Regiment =

- Active: May 1862 to September 27, 1862
- Country: United States
- Allegiance: Union
- Branch: Infantry

The 85th Ohio Infantry Regiment, sometimes 85th Ohio Volunteer Infantry (or 85th OVI) was an infantry regiment in the Union Army during the American Civil War. Although recruited as a regiment, it never achieved full strength and was only able to muster four companies, which served as a battalion (often referred to as "Zinn's Battalion", a reference to Major Peter Zinn).

== Service ==
The 85th Ohio Infantry was organized at Camp Chase in Columbus, Ohio May through June 1862 and mustered in on June 10, 1862, for three months service under Colonel Charles W. B. Allison.

The regiment moved to Kentucky and participated in operations against John Hunt Morgan July 1862. Performed prison guard duty at Camp Chase until September, then moved to Cincinnati, Ohio, and participated in the operations for the defense of that city against Edmund Kirby Smith's threatened attack August–September.

The 85th Ohio mustered out of the service September 23 and September 27, 1862.

== Casualties ==
The regiment lost a total of 10 enlisted men, all due to disease.

== Commanders ==
- Colonel Charles W. B. Allison

== See also ==
- List of Ohio Civil War units
- Ohio in the Civil War
