= 115th Ohio Infantry Regiment =

- Active: September 18, 1862, to June 23, 1865
- Country: United States
- Allegiance: Union
- Branch: Infantry

The 115th Ohio Infantry Regiment, sometimes 115th Ohio Volunteer Infantry (or 115th OVI) was an infantry regiment in the Union Army during the American Civil War.

== Service ==
The 115th Ohio Infantry was organized at Massillon, Ohio, and mustered in September 18, 1862, for three years service under the command of Colonel Jackson A. Lucy.

The regiment was attached to Post of Murfreesboro, Tennessee, Department of the Cumberland, to January 1864. 2nd Brigade, 3rd Division, XII Corps, Army of the Cumberland, to April 1864. Unassigned, 4th Division, XX Corps, Army of the Cumberland, to July 1864. 1st Brigade, Defenses of Nashville & Chattanooga Railroad, Department of the Cumberland, to March 1865. 1st Brigade, 1st Sub-District, District of Middle Tennessee, Department of the Cumberland, to June 1865.

The 115th Ohio Infantry mustered out of service June 23, 1865, at Murfreesboro, Tennessee.

== Detailed service ==
Moved to Cincinnati, Ohio, September 27. Assigned to duty by detachments as provost guard and guarding forts, arsenals, store houses, and magazines at Camp Chase, Camp Dennison, Maysville, Covington and Newport, Ky., and Cincinnati, Ohio, until October 1863. Ordered to Chattanooga, Tenn., October 23, 1863; then to Murfreesboro, Tenn. Duty at Murfreesboro, Tenn., and along line of the Nashville & Chattanooga Railroad, in block houses and at bridges until June 1865. Regiment was specially selected for this arduous duty because of the great number of skilled mechanics and artisans in its ranks. Skirmishes at Cripple Creek, Woodbury Pike, May 25, 1864 (detachment). Smyrna August 31, 1864. Block House No. 4 August 31, 1864. Company B captured by Wheeler. Block House No. 5 (Company B). Block House No. 2, on Mill Creek, Nashville & Chattanooga Railroad, December 2–3. Block House No. 1 December 3 (detachment). Block House No. 3 December 3 (detachment). Block House No. 4 December 4 (detachment). Block House No. 7 December 4 (detachment). Siege of Murfreesboro December 5–12. "The Cedars" December 5–7. Lavergne December 8. Duty along Nashville & Chattanooga Railroad from Nashville to Tullahoma, Tenn., until June 1865.

== Casualties ==
The regiment lost a total of 151 men during service; 1 officer and 8 enlisted men killed or mortally wounded, 4 officers and 138 enlisted men died of disease.

== Commanders ==
- Colonel Jackson A. Lucy

== See also ==
- List of Ohio Civil War units
- Ohio in the Civil War

== Violation of the Law of War ==
A patrol from the 115th Ohio Infantry (Co. K under Sgt Taylor Temple) was accused with the torture, including putting the eyes out of a Confederate dispatch rider PVT Dewitt Smith Jobe 29 Aug 1864. The Federal officers failed to prosecute the Soldiers for the violation of the law of war.

Tennessee Historical Marker between Nolensville and Triune commemorates Jobe's death:

“DeWitt Smith Jobe, a member of Coleman's Scouts, CSA, was captured in a cornfield about 1 1/2 miles west, Aug. 29, 1864, by a patrol from the 115th Ohio Cavalry. Swallowing his dispatches, he was mutilated and tortured to make him reveal the contents. Refusing, he was dragged to death behind a galloping horse. He is buried in the family cemetery six miles northeast."
