= 40th Ohio Infantry Regiment =

- Active: September 1861 to December 10, 1864
- Country: United States
- Allegiance: Union
- Branch: Union Army
- Type: Infantry
- Engagements: Tullahoma Campaign; Chickamauga Campaign; Battle of Chickamauga; Siege of Chattanooga; Battle of Lookout Mountain; Battle of Missionary Ridge; Atlanta campaign; Battle of Resaca; Battle of Dallas; Battle of New Hope Church; Battle of Allatoona; Battle of Kennesaw Mountain; Battle of Peachtree Creek; Siege of Atlanta; Battle of Jonesboro; Battle of Lovejoy's Station; Battle of Franklin

The 40th Ohio Infantry Regiment was an infantry regiment in the Union Army during the American Civil War.

== Service ==
The 40th Ohio Infantry Regiment was organized at Camp Chase in Columbus, Ohio September through November 1861 and mustered in for three years service on December 7, 1861, under the command of Colonel Jonathan Cranor.

The regiment was attached to 18th Brigade, Army of the Ohio, to March 1862. Unattached, Army of the Ohio to August 1862. District of Eastern Kentucky, Department of the Ohio, to October 1862. District of the Kanawha, West Virginia, Department of the Ohio, to February 1863. 2nd Brigade, Baird's Division, Army of Kentucky, Department of the Cumberland, to June 1863. 1st Brigade, 1st Division, Reserve Corps, Army of the Cumberland, to October 1863. 1st Brigade, 2nd Division, IV Corps, Army of the Cumberland, October 1863. 2nd Brigade, 1st Division, IV Corps, to December 1864.

Companies A, B, C, and D mustered out of service at Pilot Knob, Georgia, on October 7, 1864. The remainder of the regiment mustered out at Nashville, Tennessee, on December 10, 1864, with veterans and recruits being transferred to the 51st Ohio Infantry.

== Detailed service ==
Ordered to eastern Kentucky December 11, 1861. Garfield's Campaign against Humphrey Marshall December 23, 1861, to January 30, 1862. Advance on Paintsville, Kentucky, December 31, 1861, to January 7, 1862. Occupation of Paintsville January 8 to February 1. Middle Creek, near Prestonburg January 10. Expedition to Pound Gap, Cumberland Mountains, March 14–17. Pound Gap March 16. Moved to Piketon, Ky., and duty there until June 13. Moved to Prestonburg June 13, then to Louisa July 16, and duty there until September 13. Moved to Gallipolis, Ohio, September 13, then to Guyandotte, Va., October 4. Moved to eastern Kentucky November 14, and duty there until February 20, 1863. Ordered to Nashville, Tenn., February 20, thence to Franklin, Tenn. Repulse of Van Dorn's attack on Franklin April 10. Harpeth River, near Franklin, April 10. Duty at Franklin until June 2. Moved to Triune June 2. Tullahoma Campaign June 23 – July 7. At Wartrace and Tullahoma until September 7. Chickamauga Campaign September 7–22. Reconnaissance from Rossville September 17. Ringgold, Ga., September 17. Battle of Chickamauga September 19–21. Siege of Chattanooga, Tenn., September 24 – November 23. Reopening Tennessee River October 26–29. Chattanooga-Ringgold Campaign November 23–27. Lookout Mountain November 23–24. Missionary Ridge November 25. Ringgold Gap, Taylor's Ridge, November 27. Duty at Whiteside, Ala., until February 1864. Demonstration on Dalton, Ga., February 22–27. Tunnel Hill, Buzzard's Roost Gap and Rocky Faced Ridge February 23–25. Atlanta Campaign May 1 to September 8. Tunnel Hill May 6–7. Demonstration on Rocky Faced Ridge and Dalton May 8–13. Buzzard's Roost Gap May 8–9. Battle of Resaca May 14–15. Adairsville May 17. Near Kingston May 18–19. Near Cassville May 19. Advance on Dallas May 22–25. Operations on line of Pumpkin Vine Creek and battles about Dallas, New Hope Church, and Allatoona Hills May 25 – June 5. Allatoona Pass June 1–2. Operations about Marietta and against Kennesaw Mountain June 10 – July 2. Pine Hill June 11–14. Lost Mountain June 15–17. Assault on Kennesaw June 27. Ruff's Station, Smyrna Camp Ground, July 4. Chattahoochie River July 5–17. Peachtree Creek July 19–20. Siege of Atlanta July 22 – August 25. Flank movement on Jonesboro August 25–30. Red Oak Station August 29. Battle of Jonesboro August 31 – September 1. Lovejoy's Station September 2–6. Operations against Hood in northern Georgia and northern Alabama September 29 – November 3. Moved to Pulaski, Tenn., and duty there until November 22. Battle of Franklin November 30.

== Casualties ==
The regiment lost a total of 237 men during service; 6 officers and 96 enlisted men killed or mortally wounded, 1 officer and 134 enlisted men died of disease.

== Commanders ==
- Colonel Jonathan Cranor
- Colonel Jacob E. Taylor
- Lieutenant Colonel William Jones – commanded at the Battle of Chickamauga

== See also ==
- List of Ohio Civil War units
- Ohio in the Civil War
