= Battle of Franklin (1863) =

Battle of the American Civil War

Coordinates: 35.914°N 86.864°W

First Battle of Franklin
- Part of the American Civil War
Date	April 10, 1863
Location	Williamson County, Tennessee
Result	Union victory

Belligerents
United States (Union)	(Confederate States of America) Confederate States (Confederacy)

Commanders and leaders
Gordon Granger	Earl Van Dorn

Strength
Army of Kentucky	1st Cavalry Corps, Army of Tennessee

Casualties and losses
100	137

The First Battle of Franklin, though technically not a battle, was fought April 10, 1863, in Williamson County, Tennessee, during the American Civil War. It was a minor engagement in about the same location as that of the more famous Battle of Franklin (November 30, 1864), which was part of the Franklin-Nashville Campaign.

== Battle ==
The 1863 engagement at Franklin was a reconnaissance in force by Confederate cavalry leader Maj. Gen. Earl Van Dorn, coupled with an inept response by Union Maj. Gen. Gordon Granger. Van Dorn advanced northward from Spring Hill, Tennessee, on April 10, making contact with Federal skirmishers just outside Franklin. Van Dorn's attack was so weak that when Granger received a false report that Brentwood to the north was under attack, he believed it and sent most of his cavalry northward thinking that Van Dorn was undertaking a diversion.

When the truth became known—there was no threat to Brentwood—Granger decided to attack Van Dorn, but was surprised to learn that a subordinate had already done so, without orders. Brig. Gen. David S. Stanley, with a brigade from the 4th U.S. Cavalry, had crossed the Harpeth River at Hughes's Ford, behind the Confederate right rear. Stanley attacked and captured Freeman's Tennessee Battery on the Lewisburg Road, but lost it when Brig. Gen. Nathan Bedford Forrest counterattacked. This incident in his rear caused Van Dorn to cancel his operations and withdraw to Spring Hill, leaving the Federals in control of the area.

== Battlefield today ==
Fort Granger, named after Gordon Granger, is located in Franklin in Pinkerton Park on Murfreesboro Road.

== See also ==
- Battle of Franklin (1863) order of battle
