= 18th Ohio Independent Light Artillery Battery =

18th Ohio Battery
- Active: September 13, 1862, to June 29, 1865
- Country: United States
- Allegiance: Union
- Branch: Artillery
- Engagements: Tullahoma Campaign; Chickamauga Campaign; Battle of Chickamauga; Chattanooga campaign Battle of Lookout Mountain; Battle of Missionary Ridge; Battle of Nashville

18th Ohio Battery was an artillery battery that served in the Union Army during the American Civil War.

== Service ==
The 18th Ohio Battery was organized in Portsmouth, Ohio, and mustered in September 13, 1862, for a three-year enlistment under Captain Charles C. Aleshire.

The battery was attached to 2nd Division, Army of Kentucky, Department of the Ohio, to February 1863. 2nd Brigade, Baird's Division, Army of Kentucky, Department of the Cumberland, to June 1863. Artillery, 1st Division, Reserve Corps, Army of the Cumberland, to October 1863. 1st Division, Artillery Reserve, Department of the Cumberland, to March 1864. 2nd Division, Artillery Reserve, Department of the Cumberland, to December 1864. Unassigned, District of the Etowah, Department of the Cumberland, to January 1865. Post of Chattanooga, Tennessee, Department of the Cumberland, to June 1865.

The 18th Ohio Battery mustered out of service on June 29, 1865.

== Detailed service ==
Left Ohio for Covington, Ky., October 9, 1862. March to Lexington, Ky., October 23–29, 1862, and duty there until December 26. Moved to Louisville, Ky., December 26; then to Nashville, Tenn., arriving there February 7, 1863. Moved to Brentwood, Tenn., February 21. Expedition to Franklin and Spring Hill March 2–5. Action at Franklin March 4. Thompson's Station, Spring Hill, March 4–5. Duty at Franklin until June. Repulse of Van Dorn's attack on Franklin April 10. Moved to Triune June 2. Action at Triune June 11. Tullahoma Campaign June 23-July 7. Action at Fosterville, Guy's Gap and Shelbyville June 27. Moved to Wartrace July 3, and duty there until August 12. Chickamauga Campaign August 16-September 22. Reconnaissance from Rossville September 17. Ringgold, Ga., September 17. Spring Creek September 18. Battle of Chickamauga September 19–20. Siege of Chattanooga September 24-November 23. Battles of Chattanooga November 23–25; Lookout Mountain November 23–24; Missionary Ridge November 25. Pursuit to Graysville November 26–28. Ordered to Nashville, Tenn., December 1, and garrison duty there until October 1864. March to Chattanooga October 6–21. Moved to Nashville November 27. Battles of Nashville December 15–16. Pursuit of Hood to the Tennessee River December 17–28. Duty at Chattanooga, Tenn., until May 1, 1865, and at Resaca, Ga., until June 20.

== Casualties ==
The battery lost a total of 23 enlisted men during service; 2 killed and 21 died due to disease.

== Commanders ==
- Captain Charles C. Aleshire

== See also ==
- List of Ohio Civil War units
- Ohio in the Civil War
