= 182nd Ohio Infantry Regiment =

- Active: August 4, 1864, to July 13, 1865
- Country: United States
- Allegiance: Union
- Branch: Infantry
- Engagements: Battle of Nashville

The 182nd Ohio Infantry Regiment, sometimes 182nd Ohio Volunteer Infantry (or 182nd OVI) was an infantry regiment in the Union Army during the American Civil War.

== Service ==
The 182nd Ohio Infantry was organized at Camp Chase in Columbus, Ohio August 4 through October 13, 1864, and mustered in for one year service on October 27, 1864, under the command of Colonel Lewis Butler. Five companies were first organized at Camp Toledo in Toledo, Ohio, before being sent to Camp Chase to complete organization of the regiment.

The regiment was attached to Post and Defenses of Nashville, Tennessee, Department of the Cumberland, to December 1864. 2nd Brigade, 4th Division, XX Corps, Department of the Cumberland, to March 1865. Garrison at Nashville, Tennessee, Department of the Cumberland, to July 1865.

The 182nd Ohio Infantry mustered out of service July 7, 1865, at Nashville, Tennessee, and was discharged at Camp Chase on July 13, 1865.

== Detailed service ==
This regiment was organized in the state at large from Aug. 4 to Oct. 27, 1864, to serve for one year. On Nov. 1 it was ordered to Nashville Tenn., and on the 6th joined Gen. Thomas' forces at that place. The regiment took part in the Battle of Nashville, where it remained performing guard and provost duty until July 7, 1865, when it was mustered out in accordance with orders from the war department.

== Casualties ==
The regiment lost a total of 61 enlisted men during service, all due to disease.

== Commanders ==
- Colonel Lewis Butler
- Lieutenant Colonel John A. Chase

== See also ==
- List of Ohio Civil War units
- Ohio in the Civil War
