= Battery K, 1st Ohio Light Artillery =

- Active: October 22, 1861 to July 17, 1865
- Country: United States
- Allegiance: Union
- Branch: Artillery
- Engagements: Battle of McDowell; Battle of Groveton; Second Battle of Bull Run; Battle of Chancellorsville; Battle of Gettysburg; Battle of Wauhatchie; Battle of Lookout Mountain; Battle of Missionary Ridge

Battery K, 1st Ohio Light Artillery was an artillery battery that served in the Union Army during the American Civil War.

== Service ==
The battery was organized in Marietta, Cleveland, and Camp Dennison near Cincinnati, Ohio and mustered in for a three-year enlistment on October 22, 1861 under Captain William L. DeBeck. The regiment was organized as early as 1860 under Ohio's militia laws, under Colonel James Barnett.

The battery was attached to Cheat Mountain District, West Virginia, to March 1862. Cheat Mountain District, Department of the Mountains, to June 1862. 2nd Brigade, 1st Division, I Corps, Pope's Army of Virginia, to September 1862. Artillery, 1st Division, XI Corps, Army of the Potomac, to March 1863. Reserve Artillery, XI Corps, Army of the Potomac, to March 1863. Artillery Brigade, XI Corps, Army of the Potomac, to September 1863 and Army of the Cumberland to December 1863. Garrison Artillery, Bridgeport, Alabama, Department of the Cumberland, to April 1864. Unattached Artillery, Department of the Cumberland, to May 1864. Stevenson, Alabama, District of North Alabama, Department of the Cumberland, to October 1864. 3rd Brigade, Defenses Nashville & Chattanooga Railroad, Department of the Cumberland, to March 1865. Post of Stevenson, Alabama, Department of the Cumberland, to July 1865.

Battery K, 1st Ohio Light Artillery mustered out of service on July 17, 1865.

== Detailed service ==
Left Ohio for western Virginia February 1862. Battle of McDowell May 8, 1862. Franklin May 28. Pursuit of Jackson up the Shenandoah Valley, Strasburg and Staunton Road June 1–2. Harrisonburg June 6. Cross Keys June 8. Port Republic June 9. At Middletown until July, and at Sperryville until August. Pope's Campaign in northern Virginia August 16-September 2. Fords of the Rappahannock August 21–23. Freeman's Ford, Hazel River and Leary's Ford August 22. Waterloo Bridge August 23–25. Battle of Groveton August 29. Bull Run August 30. Duty in the defenses of Washington, D.C., until December. Expedition from Centreville to Warrenton. Junction and Bristoe Station September 25–28. March to Fredericksburg, Va., December 10–16. Burnside's 2nd Campaign ("Mud March"), January 20–24. Chancellorsville Campaign April 27-May 6. Battle of Chancellorsville May 1–5. Gettysburg Campaign June 11-July 24. Battle of Gettysburg July 1–3. Duty on line of the Rappahannock until September. Moved to Bridgeport, Ala., September 24-October 3. Reopening Tennessee River October 26–29. Battle of Wauhatchie October 28–29. Chattanooga-Ringgold Campaign November 23–27. Lookout Mountain November 23–24. Missionary Ridge November 25. Assigned to reserve artillery and garrison duty at Bridgeport and Stevenson, Ala., December 1863 to July 1865. Ordered home July 3.

== Casualties ==
The battery lost a total of 20 men during service; 1 officer and 5 enlisted men killed or mortally wounded, 14 enlisted men died of disease.

== Commanders ==
- Captain William L. DeBeck
- Captain Lewis Heckman
- Lieutenant George B. Haskin - commanded at the Second Battle of Bull Run
- Lieutenant Nicholas Sahm - commanded at the Battle of Lookout Mountain

== See also ==
- List of Ohio Civil War units
- Ohio in the Civil War
