= 9th Ohio Independent Light Artillery Battery =

9th Ohio Battery
- Active: October 11, 1861, to July 25, 1865
- Country: United States
- Allegiance: Union
- Branch: Artillery
- Engagements: Battle of Mill Springs; Tullahoma Campaign

9th Ohio Battery was an artillery battery that served in the Union Army during the American Civil War.

== Service ==
The 9th Ohio Battery was organized Camp Wood in Cleveland, Ohio and mustered in for a three-year enlistment on October 11, 1861, under the command of Captain Henry Shepard Wetmore.

The battery was attached to 12th Brigade, 1st Division, Army of the Ohio, to March 1862. 24th Brigade, 7th Division, Army of the Ohio, to October 1862. Unattached, Army of Kentucky, Department of the Ohio, to December 1862. Artillery, 3rd Division, Army of Kentucky, Department of the Ohio, to February 1863. Coburn's Brigade, Baird's Division, Army of Kentucky, Department of the Cumberland, to June 1863.

Artillery, 1st Division, Reserve Corps, Department of the Cumberland, to October 1863. Coburn's Unattached Brigade, Department of the Cumberland, to December 1863. Artillery, 1st Division, XII Corps, Army of the Cumberland, to April 1864. Unassigned, 4th Division, XX Corps, Department of the Cumberland, to July 1864. 3rd Brigade, Defense of Nashville & Chattanooga Railroad, Department of the Cumberland, to December 1864. Garrison Artillery, Bridgeport, Alabama, Department of the Cumberland, to July 1865.

The 9th Ohio Battery mustered out of service at Cleveland, Ohio, on July 25, 1865.

== Detailed service ==
Moved to Louisville, Ky., December 17–20, and duty at Camp Gilbert, Louisville, until January 11, 1862. March to Somerset, Ky., January 11–17, 1862. March from Somerset to London, thence to Cumberland Ford, January 30-February 16. Reconnaissance in force under General Carter to Cumberland Gap March 21–23. At Cumberland Ford March 23 to June 7. March to Powell Valley June 7–14. Occupation of Cumberland Gap June 17, and operations in vicinity until September. Evacuation of Cumberland Gap and retreat to the Ohio River September 17-October 3 (in charge of ammunition trains).

March to Lexington, Ky., October 27–31. March from Nicholasville to Danville December 10–11. Movement to intercept Morgan December 20–27. Moved to Nashville, Tenn., January 31, 1863, and duty there until March 6. Moved to Franklin March 6. Pursuit of Van Dorn to Columbia March 9–12. Return to Franklin April 8. Repulse of attack on Franklin April 10. Duty at Franklin until June 2. Moved to Triune June 2. Tullahoma Campaign June 23-July 7. Moved to Salem, thence to Guy's Gap, June 23–29. Moved to Murfreesboro July 17, and duty there until September 5. At Tullahoma until April 1864. March to Bridgeport April 23–27, and garrison duty there until July 1865.

== Casualties ==
The battery lost a total of 23 men during service; 1 enlisted man killed or mortally wounded, 22 enlisted men died of disease.

== Commanders ==
- Captain Henry Shepard Wetmore

== See also ==
- List of Ohio Civil War units
- Ohio in the Civil War
