= 102nd Ohio Infantry Regiment =

- Active: August 18, 1862, to June 30, 1865
- Country: United States
- Allegiance: Union
- Branch: Infantry
- Engagements: Defense of Cincinnati; Siege of Decatur

The 102nd Ohio Infantry Regiment, sometimes 102nd Ohio Volunteer Infantry (or 102nd OVI) was an infantry regiment in the Union Army during the American Civil War.

== Service ==
The 102nd Ohio Infantry was organized at Mansfield, Ohio, and mustered in for three years service on August 18, 1862, under the command of Colonel William Given. (The regiment is also recorded as having mustered in at Covington, Kentucky, on September 6, 1862.)

The regiment was attached to 38th Brigade, 12th Division, Army of the Ohio, to November 1862. District of Western Kentucky, Department of the Ohio, to December 1862. Clarksville, Tennessee, Department of the Cumberland, to June 1862. 1st Brigade, 3rd Division, Reserve Corps, Department of the Cumberland, to October 1863. Unattached, District of Nashville, Tennessee, Department of the Cumberland, to January 1864. 1st Brigade, 3rd Division, XII Corps, Army of the Cumberland, to April 1864. 1st Brigade, 4th Division, XX Corps, Department of the Cumberland, to April 1865. District of North Alabama, Department of the Cumberland, to June 1865.

The 102nd Ohio Infantry mustered out of service at Decatur, Alabama, on June 12, 1865.

== Detailed service ==
Moved to Covington, Ky., September 4. Duty in the defenses of Cincinnati, Ohio, until September 22. Moved to Louisville, Ky., September 22, and duty there until October 5. Train guard to Shelbyville October 5–6. Pursuit of Bragg into Kentucky October 6–15. March to Bowling Green, Ky., and duty there guarding railroad to Nashville, Tenn., until December 19. Moved to Russellville December 19, then to Clarksville, Tenn. Duty there and in the vicinity, building bridges, forwarding supplies, etc., until September 23, 1863. Movements to repel Wheeler's Raid September 26-October 30. Moved to Nashville, Tenn., and duty there until April 26, 1864. Guard duty on Nashville & Chattanooga Railroad from Normandy to Dechard until June 6. Engaged in the defense of the line of the Tennessee River from Stevenson to Seven Mile Island June 10-September 1. Duty on cars protecting Tennessee & Alabama Railroad from Decatur, Ala., to Columbia, Tenn., September 1–15. Action at Athens September 23–24. Operations on the Tennessee River in rear of Hood's army October to December. Siege of Decatur October 26–29. Evacuation of Decatur November 25. March to Stevenson, Ala., November 25-December 2, and duty there until May 1865. Moved to Decatur, Ala., May 23, and duty there until June 30.

== Casualties ==
The regiment lost a total of 262 men during service; 2 officers and 11 enlisted men killed or mortally wounded, 2 officers and 247 enlisted men died of disease.

== Commanders ==
- Colonel William Given

== See also ==
- List of Ohio Civil War units
- Ohio in the Civil War
