= 6th Ohio Independent Light Artillery Battery =

6th Ohio Battery
- Active: November 20, 1861, to September 1, 1865
- Country: United States
- Allegiance: Union
- Branch: Artillery
- Equipment: 2 4-pdr Parrotts, 2 6-pdr Rodmans
- Engagements: Siege of Corinth; Battle of Perryville; Battle of Stones River; Tullahoma Campaign; Battle of Chickamauga; Siege of Chattanooga; Atlanta campaign Battle of Resaca; Battle of Kennesaw Mountain; Siege of Atlanta; Battle of Jonesboro; Battle of Spring Hill; Second Battle of Franklin; Battle of Nashville

6th Ohio Battery was an artillery battery that served in the Union Army during the American Civil War.

== Service ==
The 6th Ohio Battery was organized at Camp Buckingham in Mansfield, Ohio, on November 20, 1861, and mustered in for a three-year enlistment on December 10, 1861, under Captain Cullen Bradley. This battery was recruited in Allen, Richland, Summit, and Tuscarawas counties.

The battery was attached to 5th Division, Army of the Ohio, December 1861 to March 1862. Artillery Reserve, Army of the Ohio, to June 1862. Artillery, 6th Division, Army of the Ohio, to September 1862. 20th Brigade, 6th Division, II Corps, Army of the Ohio, to November 1862. 3rd Brigade, 1st Division, Left Wing, XIV Corps, Army of the Cumberland, to January 1863. Artillery, 1st Division, XXI Corps, Army of the Cumberland, to October 1863. Artillery, 3rd Division, IV Corps, Army of the Cumberland, to July 1864. Artillery Brigade, IV Corps, to June 1865. Department of Louisiana to August 1865.

The 6th Ohio Battery mustered out of service at Camp Chase in Columbus, Ohio, on September 1, 1865.

== Detailed service ==
Ordered to Louisville, Ky., December 15; thence to Nolin River, Ky., and duty at Camp Dick Robinson until January 12, 1862. Moved to Columbia, Ky., January 12, 1862; thence to Jimtown and Camp Green and duty blockading Cumberland River until March 14. Moved to Nashville, Tenn., March 15–19. March to Savannah, Tenn., March 25-April 10. Advance on and siege of Corinth, Miss., April 29-May 30. Buell's Campaign in northern Alabama and middle Tennessee June to August. At Stevenson, Ala., June 18-August 21. March to Louisville, Ky., in pursuit of Bragg August 21-September 26. Pursuit of Bragg into Kentucky October 1–17. Battle of Perryville, October 8 (reserve). Harrodsburg, Ky., October 11. Danville October 14. March to Nashville, Tenn., October 17-November 6, and duty there until December 26. Advance on Murfreesboro December 26–30. Lavergne December 26–27. Battle of Stones River December 30–31, 1862 and January 1–3, 1863. Duty at Murfreesboro until June. Reconnaissance to Nolensville and Versailles January 13–15. Tullahoma Campaign June 23-July 7. Occupation of middle Tennessee until August 16. Passage of the Cumberland Mountains and Tennessee River and Chickamauga Campaign August 16-September 22. Lookout Valley September 7–8. Occupation of Chattanooga September 9. Lee and Gordon's Mills September 11–13. Battle of Chickamauga September 19–20. Rossville Gap September 21. Siege of Chattanooga September 24-November 23. Chattanooga-Ringgold Campaign November 23–27. Battles of Chattanooga November 23–25. Garrison, Fort Wood, and in reserve. Reenlisted December 12, 1863. Veterans on furlough January 1864. Non-veterans attached to 20th Ohio Battery. Reconnaissance of Dalton February 22–27, 1864. Rocky Faced Ridge and Buzzard's Roost Gap February 23–25. Atlanta Campaign May 1 to September 8. Demonstrations on Rocky Faced Ridge and Dalton May 8–13. Buzzard's Roost Gap May 8–9. Battle of Resaca May 14–15. Adairsville May 17. Near Kingston May 18–19. Near Cassville May 19. Advance on Dallas May 22–25. Operations on line of Pumpkin Vine Creek and battles about Dallas, New Hope Church and Allatoona Hills May 25-June 5. Pickett's Mills May 27. Operations about Marietta and against Kennesaw Mountain June 10-July 2. Pine Hill June 11–14. Lost Mountain June 15–17. Assault on Kennesaw June 27. Ruff's Station, Smyrna Camp Ground, July 4. Chattahoochee River July 5–17. Peachtree Creek July 19–20. Siege of Atlanta July 22-August 25. Flank movement on Jonesboro August 25–30. Battle of Jonesboro August 31-September 1. Lovejoy's Station September 2–6. Pursuit of Hood into Alabama October 3–23. Ordered to Nashville, Tenn., October 23. Temporarily attached to XXIII Corps. Nashville Campaign November–December. In front of Columbia November 24–27. Spring Hill November 29. Battle of Franklin November 30. Battle of Nashville December 15–16. Pursuit of Hood December 17–28. Moved to Huntsville, Ala., and duty there until February 1. Expedition to Eastport, Miss., February 1–9. Operations in eastern Tennessee March–April. At Nashville until June. Moved to New Orleans, La., June 19, and duty in the Dept. of Louisiana until August.

== Casualties ==
The battery lost a total of 43 men during service; 1 officer and 8 enlisted men killed or mortally wounded, 34 enlisted men died of disease.

== Commanders ==
- Captain Cullen Bradley
- Lieutenant Aaron P. Baldwin - commanded at the battle of Nashville

== See also ==
- List of Ohio Civil War units
- Ohio in the Civil War
