= 192nd Ohio Infantry Regiment =

- Active: March 9, 1865, to September 1, 1865
- Country: United States
- Allegiance: Union
- Branch: Infantry

The 192nd Ohio Infantry Regiment, sometimes 192nd Ohio Volunteer Infantry (or 192nd OVI) was an infantry regiment in the Union Army during the American Civil War.

== Service ==
The 192nd Ohio Infantry was organized at Camp Chase in Columbus, Ohio, and mustered in for one year service on March 9, 1865, under the command of Colonel Francis W. Butterfield.

The regiment left Ohio for Harpers Ferry, West Virginia, March 10. Attached to 2nd Brigade, 1st Provisional Division, Army of the Shenandoah, March 20. Marched to Charleston March. 21. Duty there until April 4. Transferred to 2nd (Ohio) Brigade, 2nd Provisional Division, March 27. Marched to Winchester April 4. Duty in the Shenandoah Valley in the vicinity of Winchester, Stevenson's Depot, Reed's Hill, and Harrisonburg until August 25. Mustered out at Winchester September 1, 1865.

The 192nd Ohio Infantry mustered out of service September 1, 1865, at Winchester, Virginia.

Members of this Unit Included: Company C: Michael Gessner b. June 18, 1830, d. March 4, 1911 (m. Magdalena Vesper Dec. 20, 1851)

== Casualties ==
The regiment lost a total of 27 enlisted men during service; 1 man killed and 26 men died of disease.

== Commanders ==
- Colonel Francis W. Butterfield

== See also ==
- List of Ohio Civil War units
- Ohio in the Civil War
