= 13th Ohio Cavalry Regiment =

- Active: May 5, 1864, to August 10, 1865
- Country: United States
- Allegiance: Union
- Branch: Cavalry
- Engagements: Siege of Petersburg; Second Battle of Petersburg; First Battle of Deep Bottom; Battle of the Crater; Battle of Globe Tavern; Appomattox Campaign; Battle of Dinwiddie Court House; Battle of Five Forks; Third Battle of Petersburg; Battle of Amelia Springs; Battle of Sayler's Creek; Battle of Appomattox Court House

The 13th Ohio Cavalry Regiment was a cavalry regiment that served in the Union Army during the American Civil War.

== Service ==
The 13th Ohio Cavalry Regiment was organized by consolidation of the 4th Ohio Independent Battalion Cavalry and 5th Ohio Independent Battalion Cavalry at Camp Chase in Columbus, Ohio, on May 5, 1864, under the command of Colonel Stephen R. Clark. The regiment was used as infantry until December 12, 1864.

The regiment was attached to 1st Brigade, 3rd Division, IX Corps, Army of the Potomac, June 8 to August 10, 1864. 1st Brigade, 1st Division, IX Corps, to December 10. 3rd Brigade, 2nd Division, Cavalry Corps, Army of the Potomac, to May 1865. Sub-District of the Appomattox, District of the Nottaway, Department of Virginia, to August 1865.

The 13th Ohio Cavalry mustered out of service August 10, 1865, at Petersburg, Virginia.

== Detailed service ==
The regiment left Ohio for Annapolis, Md., May 11, then moved to White House Landing, Va., May 18. At Washington, D.C., May 14–18, 1864. Marched to White House Landing May 18, and served duty there until June. Moved to Cold Harbor, Va. Participated in operations about Cold Harbor June 6–12. Before Petersburg June 16–19. Siege operations against Petersburg and Richmond, Va., June 16, 1864, to April 2, 1865. Mine Explosion July 30, 1864, Weldon Railroad August 18–21. Poplar Springs Church September 29-October 2. Vaughan and Squirrel Level Road October 8. Boydton Plank Road, Hatcher's Run, October 27–28. Equipped for cavalry services December 12. Dabney's Mills, Hatcher's Run, February 5–7, 1865. Appomattox Campaign March 28-April 9. Dinwiddie Court House March 30–31. Five Forks April 1. Fall of Petersburg April 2. Amelia Springs April 5. Sayler's Creek and Harper's Farm April 6. Farmville April 7. Appomattox Court House April 9. Surrender of Lee and his army. Expedition to Danville to cooperate with Gen. Sherman April 23–29. Assigned to provost duty in Amelia and Powhatan Counties until August 10.

== Casualties ==
The regiment lost a total of 117 men during service; 4 officers and 61 enlisted men killed or mortally wounded, 1 officer and 51 enlisted men died of disease.

== Commanders ==
- Colonel Stephen R. Clark

== Notable members ==
- Private Nathaniel Gwynne, Company H - Medal of Honor recipient for action at the Battle of the Crater
- Sergeant James Kastor Peirsol, Company F - Medal of Honor recipient for action at Paines Crossroads, May 3, 1865

== See also ==
- List of Ohio Civil War units
- Ohio in the Civil War
