= 1st Ohio Sharpshooters Battalion =

- Active: March 1863 to July 28, 1865
- Country: United States
- Allegiance: Union
- Type: Sharpshooter
- Role: Ambush; Close combat Irregular warfare Long range shooting Patrolling; Raiding; Reconnaissance; Screening; Tracking
- Engagements: Battle of Chickamauga; Chattanooga campaign Battle of Lookout Mountain; Battle of Missionary Ridge; Battle of Bentonville

The 1st Ohio Sharpshooters Battalion was an irregular sharpshooter battalion in the Union Army during the American Civil War that specialized in ambush, close combat, irregular warfare, long range shooting, reconnaissance in dangerous areas, screening, and tracking targets.

== Service ==
The 1st Ohio Sharpshooters Battalion was organized from four independent companies of sharpshooters and served at the headquarters of Generals William S. Rosecrans and George H. Thomas, commanders of the Army and Department of the Cumberland, March 1863 through July 1865.

The 5th Independent Company Sharpshooters was organized at Camp Cleveland in Cleveland, Ohio, and mustered on February 25, 1863, and mustered out July 19, 1865. This company was also known as Barber's Sharpshooters.

The 6th Independent Company Sharpshooters was organized at Camp Cleveland, Ohio, and mustered on December 30, 1862, and mustered out July 19, 1865. This company was also known as Coe's Sharpshooters and Thomas' Bodyguard.

The 7th Independent Company Sharpshooters was organized at Camp Cleveland, Ohio, and mustered on January 27, 1863, and mustered out July 28, 1865. This company also served at the headquarters of General William T. Sherman, commander of the Military Division Mississippi, May 20, 1864, to July 17, 1865. This company was also known as Squire's Sharpshooters and Sherman's Bodyguard.

The 8th Independent Company Sharpshooters was organized at Camp Dennison near Cincinnati, Ohio, March 9, 1863, and mustered out July 19, 1865. This company was also known as Barton's Sharpshooters.

The August 10, 1863, returns for the unit show a total strength of 129 men.

The unit suffered losses of 4 enlisted men killed or died of wounds, and 58 enlisted men dying of disease or accident, total 62 deaths in service.

== Commanders ==
- Captain Gershom Morse Barber – commanded at the battle of Chickamauga

== See also ==
- List of Ohio Civil War units
- Ohio in the Civil War
