= 145th Ohio Infantry Regiment =

- Active: May 12, 1864 - August 20, 1864
- Country: United States
- Allegiance: Union
- Branch: Union Army
- Type: Infantry
- Engagements: Battle of Fort Stevens

The 145th Ohio Infantry Regiment, sometimes 145th Ohio Volunteer Infantry (or 145th OVI) was an infantry regiment in the Union Army during the American Civil War.

== Service ==
The 145th Ohio Infantry was organized at Camp Chase in Columbus, Ohio, and mustered in May 12, 1864, for 100 days service under the command of Colonel Henry Clay Ashwill.

The regiment left Ohio for Washington, D.C., May 12. Attached to 1st Brigade, DeRussy's Division, XXII Corps, and assigned to garrison duty at Fort Whipple, Fort Woodbury, Fort Cass, Fort Tillinghast, and Fort Albany, Defenses of Washington, south of the Potomac River, until August. Repulse of Early's attack on Washington July 11–12.

The 145th Ohio Infantry mustered out of service August 20, 1864, at Camp Chase.

== Ohio National Guard ==
Over 35,000 Ohio National Guardsmen were federalized and organized into regiments for 100 days service in May 1864. Shipped to the Eastern Theater, they were designed to be placed in "safe" rear areas to protect railroads and supply points, thereby freeing regular troops for Lt. Gen. Ulysses S. Grant’s push on the Confederate capital of Richmond, Virginia. As events transpired, many units found themselves in combat, stationed in the path of Confederate Gen. Jubal Early’s veteran Army of the Valley during its famed Valley Campaigns of 1864. Ohio Guard units met the battle-tested foe head on and helped blunt the Confederate offensive thereby saving Washington, D.C. from capture. Ohio National Guard units participated in the battles of Monacacy, Fort Stevens, Harpers Ferry, and in the siege of Petersburg.

== Casualties ==
The regiment lost 10 enlisted men during service, all due to disease.

== Commanders ==
- Colonel Henry Clay Ashwill

== See also ==
- List of Ohio Civil War units
- Ohio in the Civil War
