= 21st Independent Battery Indiana Light Artillery =

- Active: September 9, 1862 – June 26, 1865
- Country: United States
- Allegiance: Union
- Branch: Artillery
- Engagements: Tullahoma Campaign; Chickamauga Campaign; Battle of Chickamauga; Chattanooga campaign Battle of Nashville

21st Indiana Battery Light Artillery was an artillery battery that served in the Union Army during the American Civil War.

== Service ==
The battery was organized at Indianapolis, Indiana and mustered in September 9, 1862, for a three-year enlistment under the command of Captain William W. Andrew.

The battery was attached to 2nd Division, Army of Kentucky, Department of the Ohio, October 1862. Unassigned, Army of Kentucky, Department of the Ohio, to December 1862. Artillery, 3rd Division, Army of Kentucky, Department of the Ohio, to February 1863. Crook's Brigade, Baird's Division, Army of Kentucky, Department of the Cumberland, to June 1863. Artillery, 4th Division, XIV Corps, Army of the Cumberland, to October 1863. 2nd Division, Artillery Reserve, Department of the Cumberland, to March 1864. Garrison Artillery, Columbia, Tennessee, Department of the Cumberland, to November 1864. Garrison Artillery, Nashville, Tennessee, Department of the Cumberland, to March 1865. 2nd Sub-District, District of Middle Tennessee, Department of the Cumberland, to June 1865.

The 21st Indiana Battery Light Artillery mustered out of service on June 26, 1865.

== Detailed service ==
Left Indiana for Covington, Kentucky, September 9. Duty at Lexington, Richmond, Danville, and Louisville, Kentucky, until February 2, 1863. Ordered to Nashville, Tennessee, February 2; then moved to Carthage, Tennessee, and duty there until June. Moved to Murfreesboro June 3. Tullahoma Campaign June 23-July 7. Hoover's Gap June 24–26. Occupation of middle Tennessee until August 16. Passage of the Cumberland Mountains and Tennessee River and Chickamauga Campaign August 16-September 22. Catlett's Gap, Pigeon Mountain, September 15–18. Battle of Chickamauga September 19–21. Siege of Chattanooga, Tenn., September 24-November 23. Battles of Chattanooga November 23–25. Duty at Chattanooga until March 26, 1864, and at Columbia, Tennessee, until November 24. Moved to Nashville, Tennessee, November 24. Battle of Nashville December 15–16. Garrison duty at Nashville until June 1865.

== Casualties ==
The battery lost a total of 28 men during service; 4 enlisted men killed or mortally wounded, 24 enlisted men died of disease.

== Commanders ==
- Captain William W. Andrew
- Captain Abram Piatt Andrew
- Lieutenant William E. Chess - commanded during the Chattanooga Campaign

== See also ==
- List of Indiana Civil War regiments
- Indiana in the Civil War
