= 176th Ohio Infantry Regiment =

- Active: August 10, 1864, to June 18, 1865
- Country: United States
- Allegiance: Union
- Branch: Infantry
- Engagements: Battle of Nashville

The 176th Ohio Infantry Regiment, sometimes 176th Ohio Volunteer Infantry (or 176th OVI) was an infantry regiment in the Union Army during the American Civil War.

== Service ==
The 176th Ohio Infantry was organized at Camp Chase in Columbus, Ohio August 10 through September 21, 1864, and mustered in for one year service on September 21, 1864, under the command of Colonel Edwin Cooley Mason.

The regiment was attached to Post and Defenses of Nashville, Department of the Cumberland, to December 1864. 2nd Brigade, 4th Division, XX Corps, Department of the Cumberland, to March 1865. District of Nashville, Tennessee, Department of the Cumberland, to June 1865.

The 176th Ohio Infantry mustered out of service June 18, 1865, at Nashville, Tennessee.

== Detailed service ==
Left Ohio for Nashville, Tennessee, September 21. Served provost and guard duty at Nashville, September 1864 to June 1865. Battle of Nashville December 15–16, 1864.

== Casualties ==
The regiment lost a total of 102 enlisted men during service, all due to disease.

== Commanders ==
- Colonel Edwin Cooley Mason
- Lieutenant Colonel William B. Nesbitt - commanded at the battle of Nashville

== See also ==
- List of Ohio Civil War units
- Ohio in the Civil War
