= Paulsen's Independent Battery =

- Active: September 2–22, 1862
- Disbanded: September 22, 1862
- Country: United States
- Branch: Artillery
- Size: Battery
- Engagements: American Civil War

Commanders
- Captain: August Paulsen
- 1st Lieutenant: R. Waits; Carl Victor Beekman
- 2nd Lieutenant: Christian Kleb; B. Zufall

Paulsen's Independent Battery was an artillery battery from Ohio that served in the Union Army between September 2, 1862, and September 22, 1862, during the American Civil War.

== Service ==
The battery was organized at Columbus, Ohio and mustered in on September 2, 1862, for a one-month service. Twenty-days later it was mustered out on September 22, 1862, by Brevet Major George McGown from the U.S. Army.

== Bibliography ==
- Dyer, Frederick H. (1959). A Compendium of the War of the Rebellion. New York and London. Thomas Yoseloff, Publisher. LCCN 59-12963.
- Keifer, Joseph Warren. (2004). Civil War Regiments from Ohio. eBookOnDisk.com Pensacola, Florida. ISBN 1-9321-5735-2.
