= 94th Ohio Infantry Regiment =

- Active: August 22, 1862, to June 6, 1865
- Country: United States
- Allegiance: Union
- Branch: Infantry
- Engagements: Battle of Perryville; Battle of Stones River; Tullahoma Campaign; Battle of Chickamauga; Siege of Chattanooga; Battle of Lookout Mountain; Battle of Missionary Ridge; Atlanta campaign; Battle of Resaca; Battle of Kennesaw Mountain; Battle of Peachtree Creek; Siege of Atlanta; Battle of Jonesboro; Sherman's March to the Sea; Carolinas campaign; Battle of Bentonville

The 94th Ohio Infantry Regiment, sometimes 94th Ohio Volunteer Infantry (or 94th OVI) was an infantry regiment in the Union Army during the American Civil War.

== Service ==
The 94th Ohio Infantry was organized at Camp Piqua near Piqua, Ohio and mustered in for three years service on August 22, 1862, under the command of Colonel Joseph Washington Frizell. The regiment was recruited in Allen, Clark, Darke, Greene, and Miami counties.

The regiment was attached to 9th Brigade, 3rd Division, Army of the Ohio, September 1862. 9th Brigade, 3rd Division, I Corps, Army of the Ohio, to November 1862. 1st Brigade, 1st Division, Center, XIV Corps, Army of the Cumberland, to January 1863. 1st Brigade, 1st Division, XIV Corps, to June 1865.

The 94th Ohio Infantry mustered out of service on June 6, 1865.

== Detailed service ==
Ordered to Lexington, Ky., August 28. Expedition to Yates' Ford, Kentucky River, August 30-September 3. Yates' Ford August 31. Tate's Ferry, Kentucky River, September 1. Retreat to Louisville, Ky., September 2–3. Pursuit of Bragg into Kentucky October 1–15, 1862. Battle of Perryville, Ky., October 8. March to Nashville, Tenn., October 16-November 7, and duty there until December 26. Advance on Murfreesboro December 26–30. Battle of Stones River December 30–31, 1862 and January 1–3, 1863. Duty at Murfreesboro until June. Tullahoma Campaign June 23-July 7. Hoover's Gap June 24–26. Occupation of middle Tennessee until August 16. Passage of the Cumberland Mountains and Tennessee River, and Chickamauga Campaign August 16-September 22. Davis Cross Roads or Dug the Gap September 11. Battle of Chickamauga September 19–21. Rossville Gap September 21. Siege of Chattanooga, Tenn., September 24-November 23. Chattanooga-Ringgold Campaign November 23–27. Lookout Mountain November 24–25. Missionary Ridge November 25. Pea Vine Valley and Graysville November 26. Ringgold Gap, Taylor's Ridge, November 27. Demonstrations on Dalton, Ga., February 22–27, 1864. Tunnel Hill, Buzzard's Roost Gap and Rocky Faced Ridge February 23–25. Atlanta Campaign May 1-September 8. Demonstrations on Rocky Faced Ridge May 8–11. Buzzard's Roost Gap May 8–9. Battle of Resaca May 14–15. Advance on Dallas May 18–25. Operations on line of Pumpkin Vine Creek and battles about Dallas, New Hope Church and Allatoona Hills May 25-June 5. Pickett's Mills May 27. Operations about Marietta and against Kennesaw Mountain June 10-July 2. Pine Hill June 11–14. Lost Mountain June 15–17. Assault on Kennesaw June 27. Ruff's Station, Smyrna Camp Ground, July 4. Chattahoochie River May 5–17. Buckhead, Nancy's Creek, July 18. Peachtree Creek July 19–20. Siege of Atlanta July 22-August 25. Utoy Creek August 5–7. Also the Flank movement on Jonesboro August 25–30. Near Red Oak August 29. Battle of Jonesboro August 31-September 1. Operations against Hood in northern Georgia and northern Alabama September 29-November 3. Marched to the sea, November 15-December 10. Siege of Savannah, December 10–21. Campaign of the Carolinas, January to April 1865. Near Rocky Mount, S.C., February 28. Taylor's Hole Creek, Averysboro, N.C., March 16. Battle of Bentonville, March 19–21. Occupation of Goldsboro, March 24. Advance on the Raleigh April 10–14. Occupation of Raleigh April 14. Bennett's House, April 26. Surrender of Johnston and his army. March to Washington, D.C., via Richmond, Va., April 29-May 20. Grand Review of the Armies May 24.

== Casualties ==
The regiment lost a total of 199 men during service; 2 officers and 52 enlisted men killed or mortally wounded, 1 officer and 144 enlisted men died of disease.

== Commanders ==
- Colonel Joseph Washington Frizell
- Lieutenant Colonel Stephen A. Bassford
- Major Rue P. Hutchins - commanded at the battle of Chickamauga

== See also ==
- List of Ohio Civil War units
- Ohio in the Civil War
