= 90th Ohio Infantry Regiment =

- Active: August 29, 1862, to June 21, 1865
- Country: United States
- Allegiance: Union
- Branch: Infantry
- Engagements: Battle of Perryville; Battle of Stones River; Tullahoma Campaign; Battle of Chickamauga; Siege of Chattanooga; Atlanta campaign; Battle of Resaca; Battle of Kennesaw Mountain; Siege of Atlanta; Battle of Jonesboro; Second Battle of Franklin; Battle of Nashville

The 90th Ohio Infantry Regiment, sometimes 90th Ohio Volunteer Infantry (or 90th OVI) was an infantry regiment in the Union Army during the American Civil War.

== Service ==
The 90th Ohio Infantry was organized at Camp Circleville near Lancaster, Ohio and mustered in for three years service on August 29, 1862, under the command of Colonel Isaac N. Ross. The regiment was recruited in Fairfield, Fayette, Hocking, Perry, Pickaway, and Vinton counties.

The regiment was attached to 22nd Brigade, 4th Division, Army of the Ohio, September 1862. 22nd Brigade, 4th Division, II Corps, Army of the Ohio, to November 1862. 1st Brigade, 2nd Division, Left Wing, XIV Corps, Army of the Cumberland, to January 1863. 1st Brigade, 2nd Division, XXI Corps, Army of the Cumberland, to October 1863. 1st Brigade, 1st Division, IV Corps, Army of the Cumberland, to June 1865.

The 90th Ohio Infantry mustered out of service on June 13, 1865, at Camp Dennison near Cincinnati, Ohio and was discharged on June 21, 1865.

== Detailed service ==
Ordered to Covington, Ky., August 30, thence to relief of Lexington September 1. Retreat to Louisville, Ky., September 2–15. Pursuit of Bragg to London, Ky., October 1–22, 1862. Battle of Perryville, Ky., October 8. At Glasgow, Ky., until November 8. March to Nashville, Tenn., and duty there until December 26. Advance on Murfreesboro, Tenn., December 26–30. Lavergne December 26–27. Battle of Stones River December 30–31, 1862 and January 1–3, 1863. Duty at Murfreesboro until June. Expedition to Woodbury April 2. Tullahoma Campaign June 23-July 7. Occupation of middle Tennessee until August 18. Passage of Cumberland Mountains and Tennessee River, and Chickamauga Campaign August 16-September 22. Lee and Gordon's Mills September 11–13. Battle of Chickamauga September 19–20. Siege of Chattanooga, September 24-October 26. Moved to Bridgeport, Ala., October 26, and duty there until January 24, 1864. At Ooltewah, Tenn., until May. Atlanta Campaign May 1-September 8. Tunnel Hill May 6–7. Demonstrations on Rocky Faced Ridge and Dalton May 8–13. Buzzard's Roost Gap May 8–9. Battle of Resaca May 14–15. Near Kingston May 18–19. Near Cassville May 19. Advance on Dallas May 22–25. Operations on line of Pumpkin Vine Creek and battles about Dallas, New Hope Church and Allatoona Hills May 25-June 5. Operations about Marietta and against Kennesaw Mountain June 10-July 2. Pine Hill June 11–14. Lost Mountain June 15–17. Assault on Kennesaw June 27. Ruff's Station, Smyrna Camp Ground, July 4. Chattahoochie River July 5–17. Peachtree Creek July 19–20. Siege of Atlanta July 22-August 25. Flank movement on Jonesboro August 25–30. Battle of Jonesboro August 31-September 1. Lovejoy's Station September 2–6. Duty at Atlanta until October 3. Operations against Hood in northern Georgia and northern Alabama October 3-November 3. Moved to Pulaski, Tenn. Nashville Campaign November–December. Columbia, Duck River, November 24–27. Battle of Franklin November 30. Battle of Nashville December 15–16. Pursuit of Hood to the Tennessee River December 17–28. Moved to Huntsville, Ala., and duty there until March 1865. Operations in eastern Tennessee March 15-April 22. Moved to Nashville, Tenn., and duty there until June.

== Casualties ==
The regiment lost a total of 252 men during service; 5 officers and 77 enlisted men killed or mortally wounded, 170 enlisted men died of disease.

== Commanders ==
- Colonel Isaac N. Ross
- Colonel Charles H. Rippey
- Lieutenant Colonel Samuel N. Yeoman - commanded at the battle of Nashville

== See also ==
- List of Ohio Civil War units
- Ohio in the Civil War
