= 108th Ohio Infantry Regiment =

- Active: August 1862 to June 9, 1865
- Country: United States
- Allegiance: Union
- Branch: Infantry
- Engagements: Defense of Cincinnati; Battle of Hartsville; Chattanooga campaign; Battle of Missionary Ridge; Knoxville Campaign; Atlanta campaign; Battle of Resaca; Battle of Dallas; Battle of New Hope Church; Battle of Allatoona; Battle of Kennesaw Mountain; Sherman's March to the Sea; Carolinas campaign; Battle of Bentonville

The 108th Ohio Infantry Regiment, sometimes 108th Ohio Volunteer Infantry (or 108th OVI) was an infantry regiment in the Union Army during the American Civil War.

== Service ==
The 108th Ohio Infantry was organized as a battalion of eight companies at Camp Dennison near Cincinnati, Ohio, in August 1862 and mustered in for three years service under the command of Lieutenant Colonel George T. Limberg. After being captured at the Battle of Hartsville and exchanged in February 1863, the regiment was reorganized at Camp Dennison; Companies I and K were mustered in on March 1, 1864, at Cincinnati and mustered out July 22, 1865, at Louisville, Kentucky.

The regiment was attached to 39th Brigade, 12th Division, Army of the Ohio, September to November 1862. District of Western Kentucky, Department of the Ohio, to December 1862. Prisoners of war to March 1863. District of Central Kentucky, Department of the Ohio, to June 1863. 3rd Brigade, 2nd Division, Reserve Corps, Department of the Cumberland, to October 1863. Unassigned, Department of the Cumberland, to December 1863. 2nd Brigade, 2nd Division, XIV Corps, Army of the Cumberland, to July 1865.

The 108th Ohio Infantry mustered out of service at Washington, D.C., on June 9, 1865.

== Detailed service ==
Ordered to Covington, Kentucky, August 21; then moved to Louisville, Kentucky. March to Frankfort, Kentucky, October 3–9, 1862; then to Bowling Green, Kentucky., October 24 – November 4. Moved to Glasgow November 10, and to Tompkinsville November 22. To Hartsville, Tennessee, November 28. Battle of Hartsville (Morgan's attack) December 7. Regiment surrendered by Colonel Moore. Paroled December 8 and exchanged January 12, 1863. Regiment reorganized at Camp Dennison, Ohio, until March 1863. Ordered to Lexington, Kentucky, March 24; then to Frankfort, Kentucky, and duty there until May. Moved to Nashville, Tennessee, May 1–4, and duty guarding railroad to Chattanooga, Tennessee, until September. Moved to Stevenson, Alabama, September 6; then march to Battle Creek and Anderson's Cross Roads, repairing road to Waldron's Ridge; then march to Chattanooga, Tennessee. Chattanooga-Ringgold Campaign November 23–27. Orchard Knob November 23. Tunnel Hill November 24–25. Missionary Ridge November 25. Chickamauga Station November 26. March to relief of Knoxville November 28 – December 8. Return to Chattanooga and duty at Rossville, Georgia, until February 1864. Demonstration on Dalton, Georgia, February 22–27. Tunnel Hill, Buzzard's Roost Gap and Rocky Faced Ridge February 23–25. Atlanta Campaign May 1 to September 8. Tunnel Hill May 6–7. Demonstration on Rocky Faced Ridge May 8–11. Buzzard's Roost Gap May 8–9. Battle of Resaca May 14–15. Rome May 17–18. Advance on Dallas May 18–25. Operation on line of Pumpkin Vine Creek and battles about Dallas, New Hope Church, and Allatoona Hills, May 25 – June 5. Operations about Marietta and against Kennesaw Mountain June 10 – July 2. Assault on Kennesaw June 27. Assigned to train guard duty on Railroad until November. Dalton August 14–16. March to the sea November 15 – December 10. Sandersville November 26. Siege of Savannah December 10–21. Campaign of the Carolinas January to April 1865. Taylor's Hole Creek Averysboro, North Carolina, March 16. Battle of Bentonville March 19–21. Occupation of Goldsboro March 24. Advance on Raleigh April 10–14. Occupation of Raleigh April 14. Bennett's House April 26. Surrender of Johnston and his army. March to Washington, D.C., April 29 – May 19. Grand Review of the Armies May 24.

== Casualties ==
The regiment lost a total of 67 men during service; 3 officers and 22 enlisted men killed or mortally wounded, 42 enlisted men died of disease.

== Commanders ==
- Colonel Joseph Good
- Lieutenant Colonel George T. Limberg - commanded the regiment before reorganization
- Lieutenant Colonel Carlo Piepho - commanded during the Chattanooga Campaign

== See also ==
- List of Ohio Civil War units
- Ohio in the Civil War
