= 14th Ohio Independent Light Artillery Battery =

- Active: September 10, 1861 to August 11, 1865
- Country: United States
- Allegiance: (United States) Union; Ohio
- Branch: Union Army
- Type: Field Artillery
- Size: Artillery battery
- Equipment: 4 × 6-pounder Wiard rifles and 2 × 12-pounder Wiard rifles 6 × 3-inch Ordnance rifles (1864)
- Engagements: Battle of Shiloh; Siege of Corinth; Atlanta campaign Battle of Resaca; Battle of Dallas; Battle of New Hope Church; Battle of Allatoona; Battle of Kennesaw Mountain; Battle of Atlanta; Siege of Atlanta; Battle of Jonesboro; Battle of Nashville

14th Ohio Battery was an artillery battery that served in the Union Army during the American Civil War. It was also known as Burrows’ Battery after its commander Jerome B. Burrows.

== Organization ==
The 14th Ohio Battery was organized in Cleveland, Ohio, and mustered in September 10, 1861, for a three-year enlistment under Captain Jerome B. Burrows. On December 9, 1864, Captain William Cary Myers became commander of the Battery and was with the unit until it mustered out of service in August 1865.

The battery was attached to 1st Brigade, 4th Division, Army of the Tennessee, to April 1862. Artillery, 1st Division, Army of the Tennessee, to July 1862. Artillery, 1st Division, District of Jackson, Tennessee, to November 1862. Artillery, District of Jackson, Tennessee, XIII Corps, Department of the Tennessee, to December 1862. Artillery, District of Jackson, Tennessee, XVI Corps, to March 1863. Artillery, 3rd Division, XVI Corps, to June 1863. District of Corinth, Mississippi, 2nd Division, XVI Corps, to January 1864. Artillery, 4th Division, XVI Corps, to September 1864. Artillery, 1st Division, XVII Corps, to November 1864. Artillery Post, Nashville, Tennessee, to November 1864. Artillery, 7th Division, Wilson's Cavalry Corps, Military Division Mississippi, to February 1865. Artillery, 1st Cavalry Division, Department of the Gulf, to June 1865. Department of Mississippi, to July 1865.

The 14th Ohio Battery mustered out of service on August 11, 1865.

== Detailed service ==
The battery moved to Camp Dennison, Ohio, January 1, 1862, to St. Louis, Missouri, on February 9 and then to Cairo, Illinois, and to Paducah, Kentucky, on February 13. The unit participated in the Battle of Shiloh, April 6–7, 1862, and the advance on and siege of Corinth, Mississippi, April 29 – May 30. The unit marched to Jackson, Tennessee, and was on duty there until June 2, 1863, then moved to Corinth, Mississippi, and was there until November 2, 1863. Moved to Lynnville, Tennessee, and duty there until March 13, 1864. Reenlisted January 1, 1864.

Atlanta Campaign May 1 – September 8, 1864. Demonstrations on Resaca May 8–13. Sugar Valley, near Resaca, May 9. Near Resaca May 13. Battle of Resaca May 14–15. Advance on Dallas May 18–25. Operations on line of Pumpkin Vine Creek and battles about Dallas, New Hope Church, and Allatoona Hills May 25 – June 5. Operations about Marietta and against Kennesaw Mountain June 10 – July 2. Assault on Kennesaw Mountain June 27. Nickajack Creek July 2–5. Ruff's Mills July 3–4. Chattahoochie River July 6–17. Battle of Atlanta July 22. Siege of Atlanta July 22 – August 25. Flank movement on Jonesboro August 25–30. Battle of Jonesboro August 31 – September 1. Lovejoy's Station September 2–6. Pursuit of Hood into Alabama October 3–26.

The unit was ordered to Nashville, Tennessee, on October 24 and participated in the Battle of Nashville December 15–16. Pursuit of Hood to the Tennessee River December 17–28. Hollow Tree Gap and Franklin December 17. West Harpeth River December 17. Richland Creek December 24. Sugar Creek, Pulaski, December 25–26. Moved to Huntsville, Alabama, then to Eastport, Miss, and duty there until February 6. Ordered to New Orleans, La. and duty there until April. Moved to Mobile Bay April 3–7. March to Greenville, Alabama, April 18–22; then to Eufala April 24–27, and to Montgomery May 5. March to Columbus, Mississippi, May 11–21, and duty there until July 27.

== Casualties ==
The battery lost a total of 49 men during service; 11 enlisted men killed or mortally wounded, 1 officer and 37 enlisted men died due to disease.

== Atlanta ==
At the Battle of Atlanta on 22 July 1864, the 14th Ohio Battery was armed with six 3-inch Ordnance rifles. Colonel John Morrill's brigade of Brigadier General John W. Fuller's division and the battery were posted on a hill west of Sugar Creek when Confederates from William H. T. Walker's division appeared 300 yd (274 m) to the south. Clement H. Stevens' brigade (led by J. C. Nisbet) attacked between Morrill's brigade and Thomas William Sweeny's Union division to the west. At first, the Confederates retreated after coming under fire from the 14th Ohio Battery. Attacking again, the brigade advanced until being counterattacked by parts of both Fuller's and Sweeny's divisions. The Confederate brigade fled and Union soldiers captured Nisbet and 500 prisoners. States Rights Gist's Confederate brigade tried to move past Fuller's right flank but was hit by enfilading artillery fire from the 14th Ohio Battery and rifle fire from the 27th Ohio and 64th Illinois Infantry Regiments. Gist was badly wounded and his troops quickly retreated to the cover of a nearby woods. Another one of Walker's brigades under Hugh W. Mercer declined to attack over the corpse-strewn ground.

== Commanders ==
- Captain Jerome B. Burrows
- Captain William Cary Myers

== See also ==
- List of Ohio Civil War units
- Ohio in the Civil War

== Bibliography ==
- Castel, Albert E. (1992). Decision in the West: The Atlanta Campaign of 1864. Lawrence, Kansas: University Press of Kansas. ISBN 0-7006-0562-2.
- Dyer, Frederick H. (1908). A Compendium of the War of the Rebellion: 14th Independent Battery Ohio Light Artillery. Des Moines, Iowa: Dyer Publishing Co. p. 1492.
- Ohio Roster Commission. Official Roster of the Soldiers of the State of Ohio in the War on the Rebellion, 1861–1865, Compiled Under the Direction of the Roster Commission (Akron, OH: Werner Co.), 1886–1895.
- Reid, Whitelaw. Ohio in the War: Her Statesmen, Her Generals, and Soldiers (Cincinnati, OH: Moore, Wilstach, & Baldwin), 1868. OCLC 444862

Attribution
