= 183rd Ohio Infantry Regiment =

- Active: September 1864 to July 17, 1865
- Country: United States
- Allegiance: Union
- Branch: Infantry
- Engagements: Battle of Franklin; Battle of Nashville; Carolinas campaign

The 183rd Ohio Infantry Regiment, sometimes 183rd Ohio Volunteer Infantry (or 183rd OVI) was an infantry regiment in the Union Army during the American Civil War.

== Service ==
The 183rd Ohio Infantry was organized in Sandusky and Cincinnati, Ohio September through October 1864 and mustered in for one year service on October 12, 1864, at Camp Dennison under the command of Colonel George W. Hoge.

The regiment was attached to 3rd Brigade, 2nd Division, XXIII Corps, Army of the Ohio, and Department of North Carolina, to July 1865.

The 183rd Ohio Infantry mustered out of service July 17, 1865, at Salisbury, North Carolina.

== Detailed service ==
Left Ohio for Columbia, Tenn., November 19, arriving there November 28. Battle of Franklin, Tenn., November 30, 1864. Battle of Nashville December 15–16. Pursuit of Hood to the Tennessee River December 17–28. Duty at Clifton, Tenn., until January 16, 1865. Moved to Washington, D.C., then to Fort Fisher, N.C., January 16-February 9. Operations against Hoke February 11–14. Capture of Wilmington February 22. Campaign of the Carolinas March 1-April 26. Advance on Goldsboro March 6–21. Occupation of Goldsboro March 21. Advance on Raleigh April 10–14. Occupation of Raleigh April 14. Bennett's House April 26. Surrender of Johnston and his army. Duty at Raleigh and Salisbury, N.C., until July.

== Casualties ==
The regiment lost a total of 83 men during service; 2 officers and 22 enlisted men killed or mortally wounded, 2 officers and 57 enlisted men due to disease.

== Commanders ==
- Colonel George W. Hoge

== See also ==
- List of Ohio Civil War units
- Ohio in the Civil War
