= 10th Ohio Independent Light Artillery Battery =

10th Ohio Battery
- Active: January 9, 1862, to July 17, 1865
- Country: United States
- Allegiance: Union
- Branch: Artillery
- Engagements: Siege of Corinth; Battle of Iuka; Second Battle of Corinth; Siege of Vicksburg; Siege of Jackson; Atlanta campaign Battle of Kennesaw Mountain; Battle of Nashville

10th Ohio Battery was an artillery battery that served in the Union Army during the American Civil War.

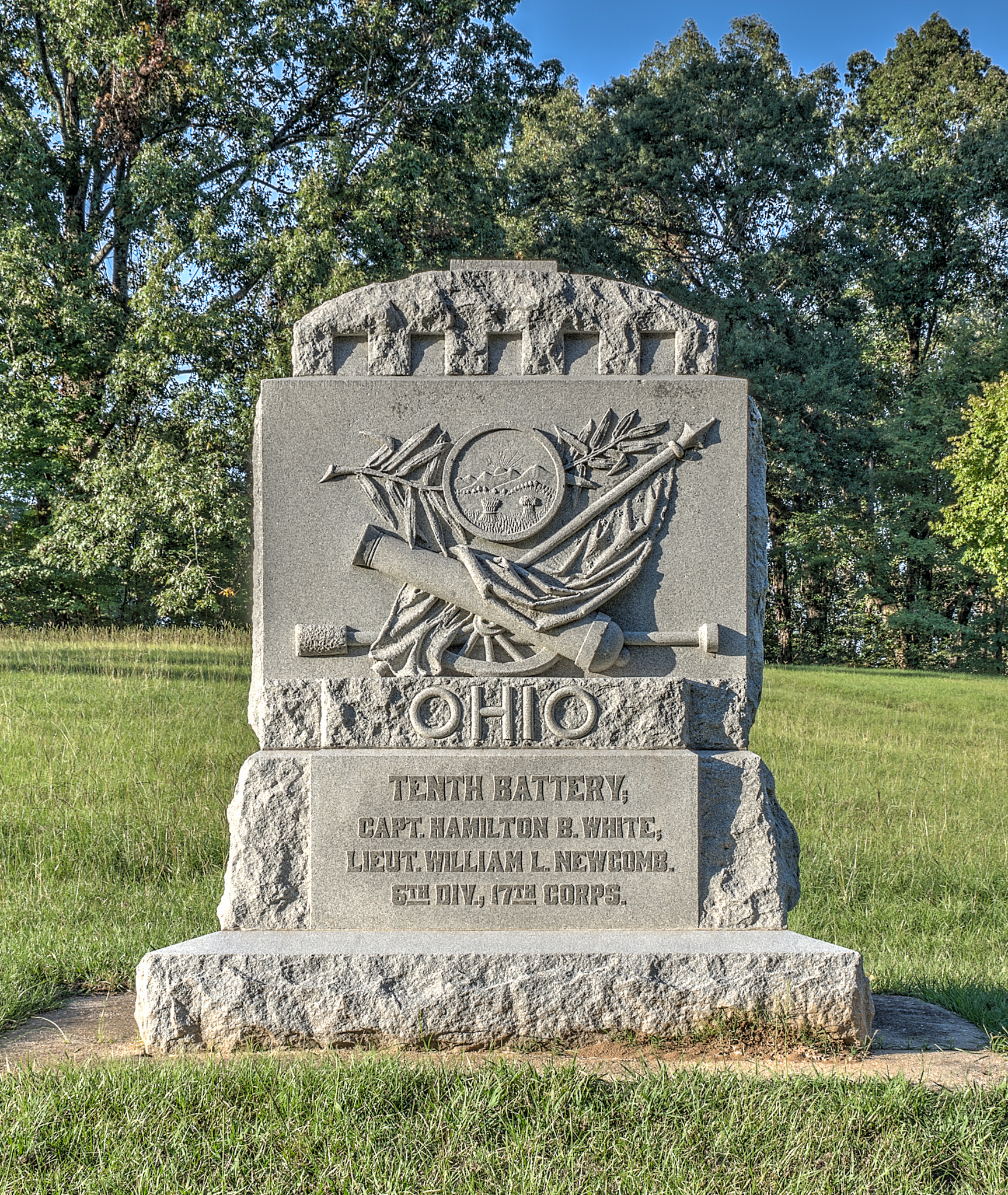
Memorial at Vicksburg National Military Park

== Service ==
The 10th Ohio Battery was organized in Xenia, Ohio January 9, 1862, and mustered in at Camp Dennison near Cincinnati, Ohio, for a three-year enlistment on March 3, 1862, under Captain Hamilton Berlace White.

The battery was attached to 6th Division, Army of the Tennessee, to July 1862. Artillery, 6th Division, District of Corinth, Mississippi, to November 1862. Artillery, 6th Division, Left Wing, XIII Corps, Department of the Tennessee, to December 1862. 3rd Brigade, 6th Division, XVI Corps, to January 1863. 3rd Brigade, 6th Division, XVII Corps, to September 1863. Artillery, 1st Division, XVII Corps, to April 1864. Artillery, 4th Division, XVII Corps, April 1864. Artillery, 3rd Division, XVII Corps, to November 1864. Artillery Reserve, Nashville, Tennessee, Department of the Cumberland, to February 1865. 2nd Brigade, 4th Division, District of East Tennessee, Department of the Cumberland, to July 1865.

The 10th Ohio Battery mustered out of service at Camp Dennison on July 17, 1865.

== Detailed service ==
Ordered to St. Louis, Mo., then moved to Pittsburg Landing, Tenn., April 4–9. Advance on and siege of Corinth, Miss., April 29-May 30, 1862. Duty at Corinth, Miss., until September 15. Moved to Iuka, Miss., and duty there until October 1. Battle of Iuka September 19 and 27. Moved to Corinth October 1–2. Battle of Corinth October 3–4. Pursuit to Ripley October 5–12. Grant's Central Mississippi Campaign November 1862 to January 1863. Moved to Memphis, Tenn., January 10, 1863, then to Lake Providence, La., January 21, and duty there until April. Movement on Bruinsburg and turning Grand Gulf April 25–30. Duty at Grand Gulf until June. Siege of Vicksburg June 13-July 4. Messenger's Ferry, Big Black River, June 29–30 and July 3. Advance on Jackson, Miss., July 4–10. Bolton's Ferry, Big Black River, July 4–6. Siege of Jackson, Miss., July 10–17. Duty at Vicksburg until April 1864. Moved to Clifton, Tenn., then marched via Huntsville and Decatur, Ala., to Ackworth, Ga., April to June 9. Atlanta Campaign June 9 to September 8. Operations about Marietta and against Kennesaw Mountain June 10-July 2. Assault on Kennesaw June 27. Nickajack Creek July 2–5. Chattahoochie River July 5–12. Turner's Ferry July 5. Moved to Marietta, Ga., July 12, and duty there until November. Moved to Nashville, Tenn., November 2, and duty there until April 1865. Battles of Nashville December 15–16, 1864 (reserve). Moved to Sweetwater, Tenn., April 1, 1865, then to Loudon, Tenn., and duty there until July.

== Casualties ==
The battery lost a total of 18 enlisted men during service, all due to disease.

== Commanders ==
- Captain Hamilton Berlace White

== See also ==
- List of Ohio Civil War units
- Ohio in the Civil War
