= Battery C, 1st Ohio Light Artillery =

- Active: September 9, 1861 to June 15, 1865
- Country: United States
- Allegiance: Union
- Branch: Artillery
- Engagements: Battle of Mill Springs; Siege of Corinth; Battle of Perryville; Tullahoma Campaign; Battle of Chickamauga; Siege of Chattanooga; Battle of Missionary Ridge; Atlanta campaign Battle of Resaca; Battle of Kennesaw Mountain; Siege of Atlanta; Sherman's March to the Sea; Carolinas campaign Battle of Bentonville

Battery C, 1st Ohio Light Artillery was an artillery battery that served in the Union Army during the American Civil War.

== Service ==
The battery was organized Camp Dennison near Cincinnati, Ohio and mustered in for a three-year enlistment on September 9, 1861. The regiment was organized as early as 1860 under Ohio's militia laws, under Colonel James Barnett.

The battery was attached to Schoepf's Brigade, Army of the Ohio, to December 1861. Artillery, 1st Division, Army of the Ohio, to September 1862. Artillery, 1st Division, III Corps, Army of the Ohio, to November 1862. Artillery, 3rd Division, Center, XIV Corps, Army of the Cumberland, to January 1863. Artillery, 3rd Division, XIV Corps, to October 1863. 1st Division, Artillery Reserve, Department of the Cumberland, to March 1864. Artillery, 2nd Division, XI Corps, Army of the Cumberland, to April 1864. Artillery, 3rd Division, XX Corps, Army of the Cumberland, to July 1864. Artillery Brigade, XX Corps, to June 1865.

Battery C, 1st Ohio Light Artillery mustered out of service at Cleveland, Ohio on June 15, 1865.

== Detailed service ==
Left Ohio for Camp Dick Robinson, Ky., October 1. Advance on Camp Hamilton, Ky., January 1–17, 1862. Battle of Mill Springs January 19–20. Moved to Louisville, Ky., thence to Nashville, Tenn., February 11-March 3. Moved to Savannah, Tenn., March 20-April 8. Advance on and siege of Corinth, Miss., April 29-May 30. Pursuit to Booneville May 31-June 12. March to Iuka, Miss., and Tuscombia, Ala., June 17–29; thence to Winchester July 29-August 7; thence to Dechard and Pelham Gap August 19–31. Moved to Nashville, Tenn., September 1–7; thence march to Louisville, Ky., in pursuit of Bragg September 14–26. Pursuit of Bragg into Kentucky October 1–15. Battle of Perryville, Ky., October 8 (reserve). March to Gallatin, Tenn., October 20-November 7, and duty there until December 25. Expedition through Kentucky to intercept Morgan December 25, 1862 to January 2, 1863. Boston December 29, 1862. Action at Rolling Fork December 29–30. Duty at Lavergne until June 1863. Expedition toward Columbia March 4–14. Tullahoma Campaign June 24-July 7. Hoover's Gap June 24–26. Occupation of middle Tennessee until August 16. Passage of the Cumberland Mountains and Tennessee River and Chickamauga Campaign August 16-September 22. Battle of Chickamauga, September 19–21. Siege of Chattanooga, September 24-November 23. Chattanooga-Ringgold Campaign November 23–27. Battles of Missionary Ridge November 24–25. Reenlisted January 4, 1864. Atlanta Campaign May to September 1864. Demonstrations against Rocky Faced Ridge and Dalton May 5–13. Battle of Resaca May 14–15. Near Cassville May 19. New Hope Church May 25. Battles about Dallas, New Hope Church and Allatoona Hills May 25-June 5. Big Shanty June 4. Operations about Marietta and against Kennesaw Mountain June 10-July 2. Pine Hill June 11–14. Lost Mountain June 15–17. Golgotha or Gilgal Church June 15. Muddy Creek June 17. Noyes Church June 19. Kolb's Farm June 22. Assault on Kennesaw June 27. Ruff's Station July 4. Chattahoochie River July 5–17. Peachtree Creek July 19–20. Siege of Atlanta July 22-August 25. Operations at Chattahoochie River Bridge August 26-September 2. Occupation of Atlanta September 2-November 15. March to the sea November 15-December 10. Siege of Savannah December 10–21. Campaign of the Carolinas January to April 1865. Chesterfield, S.C., and Thompson's Creek, near Chesterfield, March 2. Taylor's Hole Creek, Averysboro, N.C., March 16. Battle of Bentonville March 19–21. Occupation of Goldsboro and Raleigh, N. C. Near Smithfield April 11. Bennett's House April 26. Surrender of Johnston and his army. March to Washington, D.C., via Richmond, Va., April 29-May 20. Grand Review of the Armies May 24.

== Casualties ==
The battery lost a total of 36 men during service; 7 enlisted men killed or mortally wounded, 29 enlisted men died of disease.

== Commanders ==
- Captain Dennis Kenny, Jr.
- Captain Daniel K. Southwick
- Lieutenant Marco B. Gary - commanded at the battle of Chickamauga

== See also ==
- List of Ohio Civil War units
- Ohio in the Civil War
