= 26th Ohio Infantry Regiment =

- Active: June 8, 1861, to October 21, 1865
- Country: United States
- Allegiance: Union
- Branch: Union Army
- Type: Infantry
- Engagements: Battle of Shiloh; Siege of Corinth; Battle of Perryville; Battle of Stones River; Tullahoma Campaign; Battle of Chickamauga; Siege of Chattanooga; Battle of Missionary Ridge; Atlanta campaign; Battle of Resaca; Battle of Kennesaw Mountain; Battle of Peachtree Creek; Siege of Atlanta; Battle of Jonesboro; Second Battle of Franklin; Battle of Nashville

The 26th Ohio Infantry Regiment was an infantry regiment in the Union Army during the American Civil War. It was often referred to by its members as the Groundhog Regiment.

== Service ==
The 26th Ohio Infantry Regiment was organized at Camp Chase in Columbus, Ohio, beginning June 8, 1861, and mustered in for three years service on July 24, 1861, under the command of Colonel Edward P. Fyffe. The regiment was recruited in Butler, Champaign, Crawford, Delaware, Guernsey, Logan, Madison, Mahoning, Morgan, Morrow, Richland, Ross, Scioto, and Trumbull counties.

The regiment was attached to Cox's Kanawha Brigade, West Virginia, to October 1861. District of the Kanawha, West Virginia, to January 1862. 15th Brigade, 4th Division, Army of the Ohio, to March 1862. 15th Brigade, 6th Division, Army of the Ohio, to September 1862. 15th Brigade, 6th Division, II Corps, Army of the Ohio, to November 1862. 1st Brigade, 1st Division, Left Wing, XIV Corps, Army of the Cumberland, to January 1863. 1st Brigade, 1st Division, XXI Corps, Army of the Cumberland, to October 1863. 2nd Brigade, 2nd Division, IV Corps, Army of the Cumberland, to June 1865. 1st Brigade, 2nd Division, IV Corps, to August 1865. Department of Texas to October 1865.

The 26th Ohio Infantry mustered out of service at Victoria, Texas, on October 21, 1865.

== Detailed service ==
Ordered to the Kanawha Valley, W. Va., July 25. and duty there August 1861 to January 1862. Action at Boone Court House, Va., September 1, 1861. Operations in the Kanawha Valley and New River Region October 19-November 16, 1861. Ordered to Kentucky January 1, 1862. Advance on Nashville, Tenn., February 14–25. Occupation of Nashville February 25-March 18. March to Savannah, Tenn., March 18-April 6. Lawrenceburg April 4. Battle of Shiloh, Tenn., April 6–7. Advance on and siege of Corinth, Miss., April 29-May 30. Pursuit to Booneville May 31-June 6. Buell's Campaign in northern Alabama and middle Tennessee June to August. Little Pond, near McMinnville, August 20. March to Louisville, Ky., in pursuit of Bragg August 30-September 26. Pursuit of Bragg into Kentucky October 1–15. Battle of Perryville October 8 (reserve). March to Nashville, Tenn., October 16-November 7, and duty there until December 26. Advance on Murfreesboro December 26–30. Lavergne December 26–27. Battle of Stones River December 30–31, 1862 and January 1–3, 1863. Duty at Murfreesboro until June. Tullahoma Campaign June 23-July 7. Passage of Cumberland Mountains and Tennessee River, and Chickamauga Campaign August 16-September 22. Expedition from Tracy City to Tennessee River August 22–24 (detachment). Reconnaissance toward Chattanooga November 7. Lookout Valley November 7–8. Occupation of Chattanooga September 9. Lee and Gordon's Mills September 17–18. Battle of Chickamauga September 19–20. Siege of Chattanooga September 24-November 23. Chattanooga-Ringgold Campaign November 23–27. Orchard Knob November 23–24. Missionary Ridge November 25. Pursuit to Graysville November 26–27. March to relief of Knoxville November 28-December 8. Regiment reenlisted January 1, 1864. Atlanta campaign May 1-September 8, 1864. Demonstrations on Rocky Faced Ridge and Dalton May 8–13. Buzzard's Roost Gap or Mill Creek May 8. Battle of Resaca May 14–15. Adairsville May 17. Near Kingston May 18–19. Cassville May 19. Advance on Dallas May 22–25. Operations on line of Pumpkin Vine Creek and battles about Dallas, New Hope Church and Allatoona Hills May 25-June 5. Operations about Marietta and against Kennesaw Mountain June 10-July 2. Pine Hill June 11–14. Lost Mountain June 15–17. Assault on Kennesaw June 27. Ruff's Station July 4. Chattahoochie River July 6–17. Buckhead, Nancy's Creek, July 18. Peachtree Creek July 19–20. Siege of Atlanta July 22-August 25. Flank movement on Jonesboro August 25–30. Battle of Jonesboro August 31-September 1. Lovejoy's Station September 2–6. Operations against Hood in northern Georgia and northern Alabama September 29-November 3. Nashville Campaign November–December. Columbia, Duck River, November 24–27. Battle of Franklin November 30. Battle of Nashville December 15–16. Pursuit of Hood to the Tennessee River December 17–28. Moved to Huntsville, Ala., and duty there until March 1865. Operations in eastern Tennessee March 15-April 22. Duty at Nashville until June. Moved to New Orleans June 16, thence to Texas. Duty at San Antonio and Victoria until October.

== Casualties ==
The regiment lost a total of 238 men during service; 6 officers and 116 enlisted men killed or mortally wounded, 116 enlisted men died of disease.

== Commanders ==
- Colonel Edward P. Fyffe
- Colonel William H. Young - commanded at the battle of Chickamauga as lieutenant colonel
- Major Christopher M. Degenfeld - commanded at the battle of Perryville
- Captain William H. Squires - commanded at the battle of Stones River
- Captain William Clark commanded at the battle of Nashville

== See also ==
- List of Ohio Civil War units
- Ohio in the Civil War
