= 20th Ohio Independent Light Artillery Battery =

20th Ohio Battery
- Active: October 29, 1862, to July 19, 1865
- Country: United States
- Allegiance: Union
- Branch: Artillery
- Engagements: Tullahoma Campaign; Chickamauga Campaign; Battle of Chickamauga; Chattanooga campaign Atlanta campaign Franklin-Nashville Campaign; Battle of Spring Hill; Battle of Franklin; Battle of Nashville

20th Ohio Battery was an artillery battery that served in the Union Army during the American Civil War.

== Service ==
The 20th Ohio Battery was organized at Camp Taylor in Cleveland, Ohio and mustered in October 29, 1862, for a three-year enlistment under Captain Louis Smithwright.

The battery was attached to 2nd Division, XX Corps, Army of the Cumberland, to October 1863. 1st Division, Artillery Reserve, Department of the Cumberland, to November 1863. Artillery, 3rd Division, IV Corps, Army of the Cumberland, to December 1863. Garrison Artillery, Chattanooga, Tennessee, Department of the Cumberland, to November 1864. Garrison Artillery, at Nashville, Tennessee, Department of the Cumberland, to February 1865. Garrison Artillery, at Chattanooga, Tennessee, until July 1865.

The 20th Ohio Battery mustered out of service on July 19, 1865.

== Detailed service ==
- Moved to Murfreesboro, Tenn., December 31, 1862, arriving there February 8, 1863.
- Duty at Murfreesboro, Tenn., until June 1863.
- Tullahoma Campaign June 23-July 7.
- Liberty Gap June 24–27. Chickamauga Campaign August 16-September 22.
- Battle of Chickamauga September 19–20.
- Siege of Chattanooga, Tenn., September 24-November 23.
- Attached to Garrison Artillery at Chattanooga until June 1864.
- Chattanooga-Ringgold Campaign November 23–27, 1863.
- Engaged in repelling attacks of rebel cavalry under Forrest and Wheeler on the flanks of Sherman's army during the Atlanta Campaign. Action at Dalton, Ga., August 14–16.
- Marched to Alpine, Ga., September 4–20, then marched to Pulaski, Tenn.
- Surrender of Dalton October 13 (one section).
- Nashville Campaign November–December.
- In front of Columbia, Duck River, November 24–27.
- Spring Hill and Thompson's Station November 29.
- Battle of Franklin November 30.
- Battle of Nashville December 15–16.
- Pursuit of Hood to the Tennessee River December 17–28.
- Moved to Chattanooga, Tenn., and garrison duty there until July 2, 1865.

== Casualties ==
The battery lost a total of 24 men during service; 1 officer and 5 enlisted men killed or mortally wounded, 1 officer and 17 enlisted men died due to disease.

== Commanders ==
- Captain Louis Smithwright
- Captain John F. Edward Grosskopff
- Captain William Backus

== See also ==
- List of Ohio Civil War units
- Ohio in the Civil War
