= 98th Ohio Infantry Regiment =

- Active: August 20, 1862, to June 1, 1865
- Country: United States
- Allegiance: Union
- Branch: Infantry
- Engagements: Battle of Perryville; Tullahoma Campaign; Battle of Chickamauga; Siege of Chattanooga; Battle of Missionary Ridge; Atlanta campaign; Battle of Resaca; Battle of Kennesaw Mountain; Battle of Peachtree Creek; Siege of Atlanta; Battle of Jonesboro; Sherman's March to the Sea; Carolinas campaign; Battle of Bentonville

The 98th Ohio Infantry Regiment, sometimes 98th Ohio Volunteer Infantry (or 98th OVI) was an infantry regiment in the Union Army during the American Civil War.

== Service ==
The 98th Ohio Infantry was organized at Steubenville, Ohio and mustered in for three years service on August 20, 1862, under the command of Colonel George P. Webster. The regiment was recruited in eastern Ohio.

The regiment was attached to 34th Brigade, 10th Division, Army of the Ohio, September 1862. 34th Brigade, 10th Division, I Corps, Army of the Ohio, to November 1862. District of West Kentucky, Department of the Ohio, to February 1863. Reed's Brigade, Baird's Division, Army of Kentucky, Department of the Cumberland, to June 1863. 2nd Brigade, 1st Division, Reserve Corps, Army of the Cumberland, to October 1863. 2nd Brigade, 2nd Division, XIV Corps, Army of the Cumberland, to June 1865.

The 98th Ohio Infantry mustered out of service at Washington, D.C. on June 1, 1865.

== Detailed service ==
Ordered to Covington, Ky., August 23, thence to Lexington, Ky., August 27. Retreat to Louisville August 30-September 5. Pursuit of Bragg into Kentucky October 1–15, 1862. Battle of Perryville October 8. Moved to Lebanon, Ky., and duty there until December. Operations against Morgan, December 23, 1862, to January 3, 1863. Moved to Louisville, Ky., thence to Nashville, Tenn., February 9. Occupation of Franklin, Tenn., February 12, and duty there until June. Tullahoma Campaign June 23-July 7. At Wartrace until August 25. Passage of Cumberland Mountains and Tennessee River and Chickamauga Campaign August 25-September 22. Battle of Chickamauga September 19–21. Siege of Chattanooga, September 24-November 23. Chattanooga-Ringgold Campaign November 23–27. Orchard Knob November 23. Tunnel Hill November 24–25. Missionary Ridge November 25. March to relief of Knoxville, November 28-December 24. Duty at Rossville, Ga., until May 1864. Demonstration on Dalton, Ga., February 22–27, 1864. Atlanta Campaign Tunnel Hill May 6–7. Demonstration on Rocky Faced Ridge May 8–11. Buzzard's Roost Gap May 8–9. Battle of Resaca May 14–15. Advance on Dallas May 18–25. Operations on line of Pumpkin Vine Creek and battles about Dallas, New Hope Church and Allatoona Hills May 25-June 5. Operations about Marietta and against Kennesaw Mountain June 10-July 2. Pine Hill June 11–14. Lost Mountain June 15–17. Assault on Kennesaw June 27. Ruff's Station, Smyrna Camp Ground, July 4. Chattahoochie River July 5–17. Peachtree Creek July 19–20. Siege of Atlanta July 22-August 25. Utoy Creek August 5–7. Flank movement on Jonesboro August 25–30. Battle of Jonesboro August 31-September 1. Operations against Forest and Hood in northern Georgia and northern Alabama September 29-November 3. March to the Sea November 15-December 10. Siege of Savannah December 10–21. Campaign of the Carolinas January to April, 1865. Taylor's Hole Creek, Averysboro, N. C., March 16. Battle of Bentonville March 19–21. Occupation of Goldsboro March 24. Advance on Raleigh April 10–14. Occupation of Raleigh April 14. Bennett's House April 26. Surrender of Johnston and his army. March to Washington, D. C., via Richmond, Va., April 29-May 19. Washington, D.C. for the Grand Review of the Armies May 24.

== Casualties ==
The regiment lost a total of 247 men during service; 10 officers and 110 enlisted men killed or mortally wounded, 2 officers and 125 enlisted men died of disease.

== Commanders ==
- Colonel George P. Webster - killed in action at the battle of Perryville while serving as brigade commander
- Lieutenant Colonel Christian Poorman - commanded at the battle of Perryville
- Captain Moses J. Urquhart - commanded at the battle of Chickamauga
- Captain Armstrong J. Thomas - commanded at the battle of Chickamauga

== See also ==
- List of Ohio Civil War units
- Ohio in the Civil War
