= 179th Ohio Infantry Regiment =

- Active: September 29, 1864, to June 18, 1865
- Country: United States
- Allegiance: Union
- Branch: Infantry
- Engagements: Battle of Nashville

The 179th Ohio Infantry Regiment, sometimes 179th Ohio Volunteer Infantry (or 179th OVI) was an infantry regiment in the Union Army during the American Civil War.

== Service ==
The 179th Ohio Infantry was organized at Camp Chase in Columbus, Ohio, and mustered in for one year service on September 29, 1864, under the command of Colonel Harley H. Sage.

The regiment was attached to Post of Nashville, Tennessee, Department of the Cumberland, to December 1864. 2nd Brigade, 4th Division, XX Corps, Department of the Cumberland, to March 1865. Post of Nashville to June 1865.

The 179th Ohio Infantry mustered out of service June 18, 1865, at Nashville, Tennessee.

== Detailed service ==
Ordered to Nashville, Tennessee, arriving there October 8. Engaged in post and garrison duty at Nashville, Tenn., October 1864 to June 1865. Battle of Nashville December 15–16, 1864.

== Casualties ==
The regiment lost a total of 80 enlisted men during service, all due to disease.

== Commanders ==
- Colonel Harley H. Sage

== See also ==
- List of Ohio Civil War units
- Ohio in the Civil War
