= 51st Ohio Infantry Regiment =

- Active: September 17, 1861- November 3, 1865
- Country: United States
- Allegiance: Union
- Branch: Union Army
- Type: Infantry
- Engagements: Battle of Perryville; Battle of Stones River; Tullahoma Campaign; Battle of Chickamauga; Siege of Chattanooga; Battle of Lookout Mountain; Battle of Missionary Ridge; Atlanta campaign; Battle of Resaca; Battle of Kennesaw Mountain; Siege of Atlanta; Battle of Jonesboro; Second Battle of Franklin; Battle of Nashville

The 51st Ohio Infantry Regiment was an infantry regiment of the Union Army during the American Civil War.

== Service ==
The 51st Ohio Infantry Regiment was organized at Camp Meigs in Dover, Ohio, on September 17, 1861, mustered for three years of service on October 26, 1861, under the command of Colonel Thomas Stanley Matthews. The regiment was recruited primarily in Coshocton, and Tuscarawas counties with a few coming from the neighboring counties of Stark, Holmes and Knox.

The regiment was attached to the 15th Brigade, Army of the Ohio until December 1861 and to the 15th Brigade, 4th Division, Army of the Ohio until March 1862. It was unattached in Nashville, Tennessee, until June 1862, when it went to the 10th Brigade, 4th Division, Army of the Ohio, until July 1862. It was with the 23rd Independent Brigade, Army of the Ohio until August 1862, the 23rd Brigade, 5th Division, Army of the Ohio until September 1862 and the 23rd Brigade, 5th Division, II Corps, Army of the Ohio to November 1862. Afterward, it was attached to the 3rd Brigade, 3rd Division, Left Wing, XIV Corps, Army of the Cumberland until January 1863, to the 3rd Brigade, 3rd Division, XXI Corps, Army of the Cumberland until October 1863, the 2nd Brigade, 1st Division, IV Corps until June 1865, the 1st Brigade, 1st Division, IV Corps until August 1865 and the Department of Texas until October 1865.

The 51st Ohio Infantry mustered out of service at Victoria, Texas, on October 3, 1865. The regiment was discharged in Columbus, Ohio, on November 3, 1865.

== Detailed service ==
Adapted from Ohio in the Civil War: 51st Ohio Volunteer Infantry by Larry Stevens:

=== 1862 ===
- Moved to Wellsville November 3, thence to Louisville, Kentucky, and had duty there until December 10.
- Duty at Camp Wickliffe, Kentucky., until February 1862.
- Expedition down the Ohio River to reinforce General Grant, thence to Nashville, Tennessee, February 14–25.
- Occupation of Nashville February 25. Provost duty there until July 9.
- Moved to Tullahoma, Tennessee, and joined Nelson's Division.
- March to Louisville, Kentucky, in pursuit of Bragg August 21-September 26.
- Pursuit of Bragg into Kentucky October 1–22.
- Battle of Perryville, Kentucky, October 8.
- March to Nashville, Tennessee, October 22-November 7, and duty there until December 26.
- Dobbins' Ferry, near Lawrence, December 9.
- Advance on Murfreesboro December 26–30.
- Battle of Stones River December 30–31, 1862 and January 1–3, 1863.

=== 1863 ===
- Duty at Murfreesboro until June. Tullahoma Campaign June 23-July 7.
- At McMinnville until August 16.
- Passage of Cumberland Mountain and Tennessee River and Chickamauga Campaign August 16-September 22.
- Battle of Chickamauga September 19–20.
- Siege of Chattanooga, Tennessee, September 24-November 23.
- Reopening Tennessee River October 26–29.
- Chattanooga-Ringgold Campaign November 23–27.
- Lookout Mountain November 23–24.
- Missionary Ridge November 25.
- Ringgold Gap, Taylor's Ridge November 27.
- Duty at Whiteside until January 1864.

=== 1864 ===
- Reenlisted January 1, 1864.
- At Blue Springs, near Cleveland, until May.
- Atlanta Campaign May to September.
- Tunnel Hill May 6–7.
- Demonstration on Rocky Face Ridge and Dalton May 8–13.
- Buzzard's Roost Gap May 8–9.
- Battle of Resaca May 14–15.
- Near Kingston May 18–19.
- Near Cassville May 19.
- Advance on Dallas May 22–25.
- Operations on line of Pumpkin Vine Creek and battles about Dallas, New Hope Church and Allatoona Hills May 25-June 5.
- Operations about Marietta and against Kennesaw Mountain June 10-July 2.
- Pine Hill June 11–14.
- Lost Mountain June 15–17.
- Assault on Kennesaw June 27.
- Ruff's Station, Smyrna Campground, July 4.
- Chattahoochee River July 5–17.
- Peachtree Creek July 19–20.
- Siege of Atlanta July 22-August 25.
- Flank movement on Jonesboro August 25–30.
- Battle of Jonesborough August 31-September 1.
- Lovejoy's Station September 2–6.
- Operations against John Bell Hood in northern Georgia and northern Alabama September 29-November 3.
- Moved to Pulaski, Tenn.
- Nashville Campaign November–December.
- Columbia, Duck River, November 24–27.
- Battle of Franklin November 30.
- Battle of Nashville December 15–16.
- Pursuit of Hood to the Tennessee River December 17–28.
- Moved to Huntsville, Alabama, and duty there until March 1865.

=== 1865 ===
- Operations in eastern Tennessee March 15-April 22.
- Duty at Nashville, Tennessee, until June.
- Ordered to New Orleans, La., June 16, thence to Texas.
- Duty at Indianola, Green Lake and Victoria, Texas, to October."

== Casualties ==
The regiment lost a total of 346 men during service; 4 officers and 108 enlisted men killed or mortally wounded, 1 officer and 233 enlisted men died of disease.

== Commanders ==
- Colonel William P. N. Fitzgerald - appointed and resigned October 14, 1861
- Colonel Thomas Stanley Matthews - commissioned October 23, 1861, and resigned April 11, 1863
- Colonel Richard W. McClain - commanded at the battles of Perryville and Stones River as lieutenant colonel; promoted to colonel, April 14, 1863, and resigned September 30, 1864
- Colonel Charles H. Wood - commanded at the battle of Nashville as lieutenant colonel, promoted to colonel January 20, 1865 mustered out with unit October 3, 1865
- Lieutenant Colonel David W. Marshall - appointed regimental commander as lieutenant colonel

== Notable members ==
- Sergeant Frank Carey, Company A - Served as a member of the Honor Guard for President Lincoln's Funeral Train.
- Corporal Edward Blainey Crawford, Company H - Member of the Kansas House of Representatives and Kansas State Senate.
- Captain Carter Bassett Harrison - Company C - Grandson of President William Henry Harrison and brother of President Benjamin Harrison.
- Private John Emmitt Hessin - Company B - Member of the Kansas State Senate.
- Sergeant Luther Hixson - Company G - Builder in Boulder, Colorado where several of his buildings are now on the National Register of Historic Places.
- Captain John Miller Hodge - Company K - Member of the Kansas House of Representatives.
- Major Henry Kaldenbaugh - U.S. Secretary Consul to the Netherlands 1865-1866.
- Colonel Stanley Matthews (judge) - Member of the Ohio Senate, U.S. District Attorney, member of the United States Senate from Ohio and Associate Justice of the United States Supreme Court.
- Lieutenant Edgar J. Pocock - Served as Adjutant General of the Ohio National Guard 1892-1893.
- Private Winfield Scott Weeden - Company G - Wrote the music to the popular hymn I Surrender All.

== See also ==
- List of Ohio Civil War units
- Ohio in the Civil War

== Notes and references ==
- Dyer, Frederick H. A Compendium of the War of the Rebellion (Des Moines, IA: Dyer Pub. Co.), 1908.
- Helwig, Simon. The Capture and Prison Life in Rebeldom for Fourteen Months of Simon Helwig, late Private Co. F. 51st O.V.I. (Canal Dover, OH: Bixler Printing Company), n.d.
- Ohio Roster Commission. Official Roster of the Soldiers of the State of Ohio in the War on the Rebellion, 1861–1865, Compiled Under the Direction of the Roster Commission (Akron, OH: Werner Co.), 1886–1895.
- Reid, Whitelaw. Ohio in the War: Her Statesmen, Her Generals, and Soldiers (Cincinnati, OH: Moore, Wilstach, & Baldwin), 1868. OCLC 444862
- Schaar, Nancy Boothe. Letters from the 51st OVI (New Philadelphia, OH: Tuscarawas County Genealogical Society), 2001.

Attribution
