= 29th Ohio Infantry Regiment =

- Ohio state flag
- Active: August 1, 1861-July 13, 1865
- Country: United States
- Allegiance: Union
- Branch: Union Army
- Type: Infantry regiment
- Size: ~1000 at the outset of the war
- Engagements: Jackson's Valley Campaign; First Battle of Kernstown; Battle of Port Republic; Battle of Cedar Mountain; Second Battle of Bull Run; Battle of Antietam; Battle of Chancellorsville; Battle of Gettysburg; Battle of Lookout Mountain; Battle of Missionary Ridge; Atlanta campaign; Battle of Rocky Face Ridge; Battle of Resaca; Battle of Adairsville; Battle of New Hope Church; Battle of Dallas; Battle of Pickett's Mill; Battle of Kennesaw Mountain; Battle of Peachtree Creek; Battle of Utoy Creek; Battle of Jonesborough; Sherman's March to the Sea; Carolinas campaign; Grand Review of the Armies

The 29th Ohio Infantry Regiment was a volunteer infantry regiment in the Union Army during the American Civil War. Raised in the northeastern part of the state of Ohio, the 29th served with distinction in several battles of the Atlanta campaign.

The regiment was organized from August 14, 1861, through March 13, 1862, at Jefferson, Ohio, by famed statesman Joshua Reed Giddings. Mustered into the army to serve three years, the regiment was composed primarily of recruits from Northeastern Ohio counties. Col. Louis P. Buckley served as the first regimental commander.

The 29th Ohio Infantry served for some time in the defenses of Winchester, Virginia, and participated in the battles of Port Republic, Cedar Mountain, Chancellorsville, Gettysburg, Davis' Cross Roads, New Hope Church, Dallas, Pine Knob, Peachtree Creek and during the Carolinas campaign.

On the expiration of its three-year term of service, the surviving original members were mustered out, and the organization, composed of veterans and recruits, remained in service until July 13, 1865, when it was mustered out in Cleveland accordance with orders from the War Department.

The regiment had a total of 1,529 members during the war, of whom 540 were either killed, wounded or missing in action.

== Memorialization and commemoration ==
- Two decades after the Civil War, the state of Ohio erected a stone monument to the 29th Ohio Infantry Monument on Culp's Hill at the Gettysburg Battlefield. (Photo of the monument to the 29th Ohio Infantry)
- The 29th's silk regimental flag is on display at the Jefferson Historical Society in Jefferson, Ohio. (Photo of the regimental flag)
