= Union Army of Kentucky =

Army of Kentucky
- Active: 1862 (August); 1862 – 1863 (October)
- Country: United States of America
- Branch: Union Army
- Engagements: American Civil War

Commanders
- Notable commanders: William "Bull" Nelson; Gordon Granger

The Army of Kentucky was the name of two Union Army formations. Both were small and short-lived, serving in Kentucky in 1862 in 1863.

== Army of August 1862 ==
On August 25, 1862, Major General William "Bull" Nelson assumed command of the forces stationed around Richmond, Kentucky. Although the whole force was no more than two brigades, Nelson dubbed the force "Army of Kentucky". The two brigades were commanded by brigadier generals Mahlon D. Manson and Charles Cruft respectively. Merely five days after its creation, the army of mostly green soldiers went into action at the Battle of Richmond and was soundly defeated. The army lost over 800 killed and 4,000 prisoners. Because of the large number of prisoners (including Manson) and the wounding of Nelson, the Army of Kentucky virtually ceased to exist. Cruft officially remained in command of the 2nd Brigade until September but the majority of his brigade had been captured while the rest simply retreated to Louisville, Kentucky. Captain Charles C. Gilbert was appointed acting major general and placed in command of the remnants of the Army. In September 1862 Maj. Gen. Don Carlos Buell absorbed the remnants into the III Corps of the Army of the Ohio.

== Army of October 1862 ==
On October 7, 1862, Maj. Gen. Gordon Granger revived the name "Army of Kentucky". It was originally composed of three divisions commanded respectively by generals Andrew J. Smith, Quincy A. Gilmore, and Absalom Baird.

This form of the army was unusual in the fact that on January 20, 1863, it was attached to the larger Army of the Cumberland. Baird's division fought at the Battle of Thompson's Station in March 1863 and nearly one entire brigade was captured there. In April 1863, the army was composed of two divisions of infantry under Gilbert and Baird with a brigade of cavalry under Brigadier General Green Clay Smith. A division of cavalry under Maj. Gen. David S. Stanley was attached as well as the garrison of Franklin, Tennessee. In this formation the army fought at the First Battle of Franklin on April 10. On June 8, 1863, the Army of Kentucky essentially became the Reserve Corps of the Army of the Cumberland still under the command of Granger.

== Commanders ==
- William "Bull" Nelson (August 25 – 30, 1862)
- Charles C. Gilbert (September 1 – 27, 1862)
- Gordon Granger (October 7, 1862 – June 8, 1863)

== Major battles ==
- Battle of Richmond (Nelson)
- First Battle of Franklin (Granger)

== See also ==
- Richmond Union order of battle
- Franklin (1863) order of battle
