= List of Iowa units in the American Civil War =

This is a list of American Civil War units from Iowa which fought in the Union Army. A total of 48 infantry regiments, nine cavalry regiments, and four artillery batteries were raised from Iowa.

== Infantry ==
- 1st Iowa Infantry Regiment
- 1st Iowa Infantry Regiment (African Descent)
- 2nd Iowa Infantry Regiment
- 3rd Iowa Infantry Regiment
- 4th Iowa Infantry Regiment
- 5th Iowa Infantry Regiment
- 6th Iowa Infantry Regiment
- 7th Iowa Infantry Regiment
- 8th Iowa Infantry Regiment
- 9th Iowa Infantry Regiment
- 10th Iowa Infantry Regiment
- 11th Iowa Infantry Regiment
- 12th Iowa Infantry Regiment
- 13th Iowa Infantry Regiment
- 14th Iowa Infantry Regiment
- 15th Iowa Infantry Regiment
- 16th Iowa Infantry Regiment
- 17th Iowa Infantry Regiment
- 18th Iowa Infantry Regiment
- 19th Iowa Infantry Regiment
- 20th Iowa Infantry Regiment
- 21st Iowa Infantry Regiment
- 22nd Iowa Infantry Regiment
- 23rd Iowa Infantry Regiment
- 24th Iowa Infantry Regiment
- 25th Iowa Infantry Regiment
- 26th Iowa Infantry Regiment
- 27th Iowa Infantry Regiment
- 28th Iowa Infantry Regiment
- 29th Iowa Infantry Regiment
- 30th Iowa Infantry Regiment
- 31st Iowa Infantry Regiment
- 32nd Iowa Infantry Regiment
- 33rd Iowa Infantry Regiment
- 34th Iowa Infantry Regiment
- 35th Iowa Infantry Regiment
- 36th Iowa Infantry Regiment
- 37th Iowa Infantry Regiment - The "Graybeard Regiment"
- 38th Iowa Infantry Regiment
- 39th Iowa Infantry Regiment
- 40th Iowa Infantry Regiment
- 41st Iowa Infantry Regiment - Failed to complete organization and was not mustered into service.
- 41st Battalion Iowa Volunteer Infantry
- 42nd Iowa Infantry Regiment - Failed to complete organization and was not mustered into service.
- 43rd Iowa Infantry Regiment - Failed to complete organization and was not mustered into service.
- 44th Iowa Infantry Regiment - 100-day service regiment
- 45th Iowa Infantry Regiment - 100-day service regiment
- 46th Iowa Infantry Regiment - 100-day service regiment
- 47th Iowa Infantry Regiment - 100-day service regiment
- 48th Iowa Infantry Regiment - 100-day service regiment, failed to complete organization and was not mustered as regiment, see 48th Battalion Iowa Volunteer Infantry.
- 48th Iowa Infantry Battalion - 100-day service unit

== Cavalry ==
- 1st Iowa Cavalry Regiment
- 2nd Iowa Cavalry Regiment
- 3rd Iowa Cavalry Regiment
- 4th Iowa Cavalry Regiment
- 5th Iowa Cavalry Regiment
- 6th Iowa Cavalry Regiment
- 7th Iowa Cavalry Regiment
- 8th Iowa Cavalry Regiment
- 9th Iowa Cavalry Regiment

== Artillery ==
- 1st Iowa Independent Battery Light Artillery
- 2nd Iowa Independent Battery Light Artillery
- 3rd Iowa Independent Battery Light Artillery - "The Dubuque Battery"
- 4th Iowa Independent Battery Light Artillery

== See also ==
- Iowa in the American Civil War
- Lists of American Civil War Regiments by State
- United States Colored Troops
