= Battle of Fort Stevens order of battle: Union =

The following Union Army units and commanders fought in the Battle of Fort Stevens of the American Civil War on July 11–12, 1864. The Confederate order of battle is listed separately.

== Abbreviations used ==
=== Military rank ===
- MG = Major General
- BG = Brigadier General
- Col = Colonel
- Ltc = Lieutenant Colonel
- Maj = Major
- Cpt = Captain

=== Other ===
- w = wounded
- k = killed

== Defenses of the Potomac River & Washington ==
MG Alexander McDowell McCook

- Chief of Engineers: Ltc Barton Stone Alexander
- Aide-de-Camp: Col Norton Parker Chipman

Division	Brigade	Regiments and Other
Emergency Division; BG Montgomery C. Meigs	First Brigade BG Daniel H. Rucker	Quartermaster's employees; Detachment from Provisional Brigade
Emergency Division; BG Montgomery C. Meigs	Second Brigade BG Halbert E. Paine	2nd District of Columbia: Col Charles Madison Alexander; 12th Regiment, Veteran Reserve Corps; Quartermaster's employees, three companies
Emergency Division; BG Montgomery C. Meigs	3rd Brigade Col Richard Butler Price; Col Addison Farnsworth, July 12	Quartermaster's employees; Convalescents
Emergency Division; BG Montgomery C. Meigs	Cavalry	Dismounted cavalry detachment: Maj George G. Briggs; 25th New York Cavalry (dismounted): Maj Charles J. Seymour

=== VI Corps ===
MG Horatio G. Wright

Division	Brigade	Regiments and Others
First Division; BG David A. Russell	1st Brigade Col William H. Penrose	4th New Jersey: Cpt Ebenezer Davis; 10th New Jersey: Ltc Charles H. Tay; 15th New Jersey: Ltc Edward L. Campbell
First Division; BG David A. Russell	2nd Brigade BG Emory Upton	2nd Connecticut Heavy Artillery: Col Ranald S. Mackenzie; 65th New York: Col Joseph E. Hamblin; 67th New York: Cpt Henry C. Fisk; 95th Pennsylvania: Maj Francis Joshua Randall; 96th Pennsylvania: Ltc William S. Lessig; 121st New York: Maj Henry Galpin
First Division; BG David A. Russell	3rd Brigade Col Oliver Edwards	2nd Rhode Island: Cpt Elisha Hunt Rhodes; 5th Wisconsin Battalion: Cpt Charles W. Kempf; 6th Maine Battalion: Maj George Fuller; 37th Massachusetts: Ltc George Montague; 23rd Pennsylvania: Col John F. Glenn; 49th Pennsylvania: Maj Amor W. Wakefield; 82nd Pennsylvania: Ltc John M. Wetherill; 119th Pennsylvania: Ltc Gideon Clark
Second Division; BG George W. Getty	1st Brigade BG Frank Wheaton	62nd New York: Cpt Lewis J. Stewart; 93rd Pennsylvania: Ltc John S. Long; 98th Pennsylvania: Ltc John B. Kohler; 102nd Pennsylvania: Maj Thomas McLaughlin; 139th Pennsylvania: Maj Robert Munroe
Second Division; BG George W. Getty	2nd Brigade (Vermont Brigade) BG Lewis A. Grant	1st Vermont Heavy Artillery: Maj Aldace F. Walker; 2nd Vermont: Ltc Amasa S. Tracy; 3rd Vermont: Ltc Samuel E. Pingree; 4th Vermont: Col George P. Foster; 5th Vermont: Cpt Friend H. Barney; 6th Vermont: Ltc Oscar A. Hale
Second Division; BG George W. Getty	3rd Brigade Col Daniel Bidwell	7th Maine: Cpt John W. Channing; 43rd New York: Cpt Volkert V. Van Patten; 49th New York (battalion): Ltc George W. Johnson (mw), Cpt Erastus D. Holt; 77th New York: Ltc Winsor B. French; 122nd New York: Maj Jabez M. Brower; 61st Pennsylvania (battalion): Cpt William H. Rodgers
Artillery	Artillery Brigade Col Charles H. Tompkins	5th Maine Light Artillery: Cpt Greenlief T. Stevens; 1st Massachusetts Light Artillery, Battery A: Cpt William H. McCartney; 1st New York Light Artillery, Battery: Cpt Andrew Cowan; 1st Rhode Island Light Artillery, Battery C: Cpt Richard Waterman; 1st Rhode Island Light Artillery, Battery G: Cpt George W. Adams; 5th U.S. Artillery, Battery M: Cpt James McKnight

=== XIX Corps (Detachment) ===
MG Quincy A. Gillmore

Division	Brigade	Regiments and Others
First Division; BG William Dwight	1st Brigade Col George L. Beal	29th Maine: Ltc Charles S. Emerson; 30th Massachusetts: Col Samuel D. Shipley; 114th New York: Col Samuel R. Per Lee; 116th New York: Col George M. Love; 153rd New York: Col Edwin P. Davis
First Division; BG William Dwight	2nd Brigade BG James W. McMillan	12th Connecticut: Ltc Frank H. Peck; 13th Maine: Col Henry Rust II; 15th Maine: Col Isaac Dyer; 47th Pennsylvania: Col Tilghman H. Good; 8th Vermont: Col Stephen Thomas
First Division; BG William Dwight	3rd Brigade Col Leonard D. H. Currie	30th Maine: Cpt George W. Randall; 133rd New York: Cpt Anthony J. Allaire; 160th New York: Ltc John B. Van Petten; 165th New York: Maj Felix Agnus; 173rd New York: Maj George W. Rogers
First Division; BG William Dwight	Division Artillery	New York Light Artillery, 5th Battery; 1st Rhode Island Artillery, Battery D: Cpt William W. Buckley
Second Division; BG Cuvier Grover	3rd Brigade Col Jacob Sharpe	38th Massachusetts: Ltc James P. Richardson; 128th New York: Ltc James P. Foster; 156th New York: Ltc Alfred Neafie; 175th New York: Cpt Charles McCarthey; 176th New York: Maj Charles Lewis
Second Division; BG Cuvier Grover	4th Brigade Col David Shunk	8th Indiana: Ltc Alexander J. Kinney; 18th Indiana: Ltc William S. Charles; 24th Iowa: Ltc John Q. Wilds; 28th Iowa: Ltc Bartholomew W. Wilson

=== XXII Corps and Department of Washington ===
MG Christopher C. Augur

Division	Brigade	Regiments and Others
Defenses North of the Potomac; BG Martin D. Hardin	1st Brigade Col James M. Warner	151st Ohio: Col John M. C. Marble; 13th Michigan Battery: Lt Charles Dupont; 14th Michigan Battery: Cpt Charles Heine; 9th New York Heavy Artillery (detachment); 1st Pennsylvania Artillery Battalion: Maj Joseph M. Knap; 1st Rhode Island Light Artillery, Battery D: Cpt William M. Buckley; 2nd U.S. Artillery, Battery I; 3rd U.S. Artillery, Battery G; 4th U.S. Artillery, Battery A: Lt Rufus King, Jr.
Defenses North of the Potomac; BG Martin D. Hardin	2nd Brigade Ltc Joseph A. Haskin	150th Ohio: Col William H. Hayward; 170th Ohio: Col Miles J. Saunders; New Hampshire Heavy Artillery, 1st Company: Cpt Charles H. Long; 1st Ohio Light Artillery, Battery L: Cpt Franklin C. Gibbs; 2nd Pennsylvania Heavy Artillery: Cpt John Norris; 2nd U.S. Artillery, Battery I: Lt William P. Graves; 7th Veteran Reserve Corps; 21st Veteran Reserve Corps
Defenses North of the Potomac; BG Martin D. Hardin	3rd Brigade Ltc John H. Oberteuffer	Massachusetts Heavy Artillery (detachment); 3rd U.S. Artillery, Battery G: Lt Herbert F. Guthrie; 1st Pennsylvania Light Artillery
Defenses South of the Potomac; BG Gustavus A. DeRussy	1st Brigade Col Joseph N. G. Whistler	145th Ohio: Col Henry C. Ashwill; 147th Ohio: Col Benjamin R. Rosson; 164th Ohio: Col John C. Lee, Ltc Augustus S. Bement; 1st Maine Artillery, Battery A: Cpt Albert W. Bradbury; Maryland Light Artillery, Battery A: Cpt James H. Rigby; Maryland Light Artillery, Battery D: Cpt John M. Bruce; 6th Massachusetts; 18th Massachusetts (detachment); 1st New York Light Artillery, Battery K: Cpt Solon W. Stocking; 5th New York Battery: Cpt Elijah D. Taft; 84th New York; 1st Pennsylvania Light Artillery, Battery G: Cpt Beldin Spence; 1st Pennsylvania Light Artillery, Battery H: Cpt Andrew Fagan; 1st Rhode Island Artillery, Battery H; 1st U.S. Artillery, Battery E; 2nd U.S. Artillery, Battery G: Lt James E. Wilson
Defenses South of the Potomac; BG Gustavus A. DeRussy	2nd Brigade Col Thomas Wilhelm	Massachusetts Heavy Artillery, 15th Company; 16th Massachusetts Independent Battery; Pennsylvania Light Artillery, Battery C: Capt James Thompson; Pennsylvania Light Artillery, Battery I: Cpt Robert J. Nevin; 1st New York Heavy Artillery, Battery K; 17th New York Artillery, Independent Battery; 169th Ohio: Col Nathaniel Haynes; 1st Rhode Island Light Artillery, Battery H: Cpt Crawford Allen; 1st U.S. Artillery, Battery E: Lt Frank S. French
Defenses South of the Potomac; BG Gustavus A. DeRussy	3rd Brigade created 10 July Col William Smith Irwin	Maryland Artillery, Battery D; 136th Ohio: Col William Smith Irwin; 142nd Ohio (detachment); 166th Ohio: Col Harrison G. Blake; 16th Indiana Battery: Cpt Charles R. Deming; Massachusetts Heavy Artillery, 15th Company: Cpt Joseph M. Parsons; 1st New York Heavy Artillery, Battery F: Cpt William R. Wilson; 1st Pennsylvania Heavy Artillery, Independent Battery; 72nd Pennsylvania (detachment); 106th Pennsylvania (detachment)
Defenses South of the Potomac; BG Gustavus A. DeRussy	4th Brigade created 2 July Maj. Charles C. Meservey	66th New York (detachment); 136th Ohio (detachment); 10th New York Heavy Artillery (detachment); 1st West Virginia Light Artillery, Battery C: Cpt Wallace Hill; 1st Wisconsin Heavy Artillery, Company A; 2nd Massachusetts Cavalry (detachment)
Defenses South of the Potomac; BG Gustavus A. DeRussy	Cavalry Col Charles Russell Lowell	2nd Massachusetts Cavalry: Ltc Caspar Crowninshield; 13th New York Cavalry: Col Henry Gansevoort; 16th New York Cavalry: Col Henry M. Lazelle
District of Washington; Col Moses N. Wisewell	1st Veteran Reserve Brigade Col George W. Gile (attached to Hardin's Division)	1st Regiment, Veteran Reserve Corps; 9th Regiment, Veteran Reserve Corps; 6th Regiment, Veteran Reserve Corps; 19th Regiment, Veteran Reserve Corps; 20th Regiment, Veteran Reserve Corps; 22nd Regiment, Veteran Reserve Corps
District of Washington; Col Moses N. Wisewell	Not brigaded	27th Pennsylvania, Company F; 150th Pennsylvania, Company K; Union Light Guard (Ohio Cavalry); U.S. Ordnance Detachment
Cavalry Division; Col William Gamble	1st Division Cpt Benjamin Rockafellow	1st Brigade: Lt Charles Parker (Detachments of 1st, 5th, 6th and 7th Michigan cavalry regiments); 2nd Brigade: Lt William J. Allen (Detachments of 4th, 6th and 9th New York and 17th Pennsylvania cavalry regiments); Reserve Brigade: Lt Marcellus E. Jones (Detachments of 19th New York, 6th Pennsylvania, 1st Rhode Island, 1st, 2nd, 5th and 6th U.S. cavalry regiments)
Cavalry Division; Col William Gamble	2nd Division Cpt James T. Peale	1st Brigade: Lt George W. Brooks (Detachments of 1st Massachusetts, 1st New Jersey, 10th New York, 6th Ohio, 1st and 3rd Pennsylvania cavalry regiments); 2nd Brigade: Cpt Robert A. Robinson (Detachments of 1st Maine, 2nd, 4th, 8th, 13th and 16th Pennsylvania cavalry regiments)
Cavalry Division; Col William Gamble	3rd Division Maj Henry W. Sawyer	1st Brigade: Cpt Robert Loudon (Detachments of 1st Connecticut, 2nd Ohio, 18th Pennsylvania, 2nd, 3rd and 5th New York cavalry regiments); 2nd Brigade: Lt George W. Byard (Detachments of 8th Illinois, 3rd Indiana, 1st Ohio, 1st Vermont, 8th, 22nd and 25th New York cavalry regiments)
District of Alexandria; BG John P. Slough (not engaged)	2nd Veteran Reserve Brigade Col William H. Browne	3rd Regiment, Veteran Reserve Corps: Ltc John Spiedel; 12th Regiment, Veteran Reserve Corps: Col Addison Farnsworth
District of Alexandria; BG John P. Slough (not engaged)	Not brigaded	1st District of Columbia: Ltc Robert Boyd; Pennsylvania Light Artillery, Battery H: Cpt William Borrowe; 8th Illinois Cavalry, Company D: Cpt Henry J. Hotop; 1st Michigan Cavalry, Company D: Cpt Thurlow W. Lusk

== Front Line Commanders ==
In addition to their own commands these officers supervised a section of Washington's fortifications during the battle.

Commander	Line
Alexander M. McCook	Defenses of the Potomac River & Washington (overall command)
Quincy A. Gillmore	Northeast Line: Fort Lincoln to Fort Totten (XIX Corps, Detachment)
Montgomery C. Meigs	Northern Line: Fort Totten to Fort DeRussy (including Fort Stevens) (Quartermaster Corps)
Martin D. Hardin	Northwest Line: Fort DeRussy to Fort Sumner (1st Division, XXII Corps)
Horatio G. Wright	Reserve troops (VI Corps)
