= Battle of Monocacy order of battle: Union =

The following Union Army units and commanders fought in the Battle of Monocacy of the American Civil War. The Confederate order of battle is shown separately.

== Abbreviations used ==
=== Military rank ===
- MG = Major General
- BG = Brigadier General
- Col = Colonel
- Ltc = Lieutenant Colonel
- Maj = Major
- Cpt = Captain

=== Other ===
- w = wounded

=== VIII Corps (detachment) ===
MG Lewis Wallace

Brigade	Regiment or other
First Brigade BG Erastus B. Tyler	1st Maryland Potomac Home Brigade (5 companies): Cpt Charles J. Brown; 3rd Maryland Potomac Home Brigade: Col Charles Gilpin; 11th Maryland: Col William T. Landstreet; 144th Ohio (3 companies): Col Samuel H. Hunt; 149th Ohio (7 companies): Col Allison L. Brown; Baltimore Artillery (6 guns): Cpt Frederick W. Alexander; Howitzer, B&O Railroad Blockhouse: Cpt William H. Wiegel
Cavalry Ltc David R. Clendenin	8th Illinois Cavalry: Ltc David R. Clendenin; 159th Ohio Infantry (detachment; mounted): Cpt Edward H. Leib; Detachment Mixed Cavalry: Maj Charles H. Wells; Loudoun Virginia Rangers

=== VI Corps (detachment) ===
Division	Brigade	Regiments and other
Third Division; BG James B. Ricketts	First Brigade Col William S. Truex (w); Col William Emerson	14th New Jersey: Ltc Caldwell K. Hall (w); 106th New York: Cpt Edward M. Paine; 151st New York: Col William Emerson; 87th Pennsylvania: Ltc James Alonzo Stahle; 10th Vermont: Col William Wirt Henry (w)
Third Division; BG James B. Ricketts	Second Brigade Col Matthew R. McClennan	9th New York Heavy Artillery: Col William H. Seward Jr. (w); 110th Ohio: Ltc Otto H. Brinkley; 122nd Ohio (detachment): Ltc Charles J. Gibson; 126th Ohio: Ltc Aaron W. Ebright; 138th Pennsylvania: Maj Lewis A. May
