= Battle of Monocacy order of battle =

The order of battle for the Battle of Monocacy includes:

- Battle of Monocacy order of battle: Confederate
- Battle of Monocacy order of battle: Union
