= 132nd Ohio Infantry Regiment =

- Active: May 15, 1864, to September 10, 1864
- Country: United States
- Allegiance: Union
- Branch: Infantry

Insignia
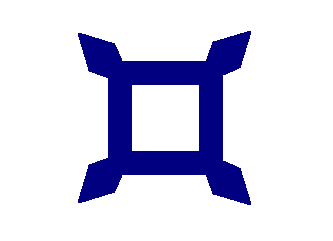
- 3rd Division, X Corps

The 132nd Ohio Infantry Regiment, sometimes 132nd Ohio Volunteer Infantry (or 132nd OVI) was an infantry regiment in the Union Army during the American Civil War.

== Service ==
The 132nd Ohio Infantry was organized at Camp Chase in Columbus, Ohio, and mustered on May 15, 1864, for 100 days service under the command of Colonel Joel Haines.

The regiment was attached to 2nd Brigade, 3rd Division, X Corps, Army of the James.

The 132nd Ohio Infantry mustered out of service at Columbus, Ohio, on September 10, 1864.

== Detailed service ==
Left Ohio for Washington, D.C., May 22. In camp near Fort Albany until May 30. Embarked at Alexandria, Virginia, for White House, Virginia, May 30. Fatigue duty at White House, Virginia, until June 11. Moved to Bermuda Hundred, Virginia, June 11. Fatigue and picket duty at Bermuda Hundred until August 12. Moved to Norfolk, Virginia, August 12; then to Washington, D.C., August 27, and arrived at Columbus, Ohio, August 30.

== Ohio National Guard ==
Over 35,000 Ohio National Guardsmen were federalized and organized into regiments for 100 days service in May 1864. Shipped to the Eastern Theater, they were designed to be placed in "safe" rear areas to protect railroads and supply points, thereby freeing regular troops for Lt. Gen. Ulysses S. Grant’s push on the Confederate capital of Richmond, Virginia. As events transpired, many units found themselves in combat, stationed in the path of Confederate Gen. Jubal Early’s veteran Army of the Valley during its famed Valley Campaigns of 1864. Ohio Guard units met the battle-tested foe head on and helped blunt the Confederate offensive thereby saving Washington, D.C. from capture. Ohio National Guard units participated in the battles of Monacacy, Fort Stevens, Harpers Ferry, and in the siege of Petersburg.

== Casualties ==
The regiment lost 47 men during service; 2 enlisted men killed, 45 enlisted men due to disease.

== Commanders ==
- Colonel Joel Haines

== See also ==
- List of Ohio Civil War units
- Ohio in the Civil War
