= 162nd Ohio Infantry Regiment =

- Active: May 20, 1864, to September 4, 1864
- Country: United States
- Allegiance: Union
- Branch: Infantry

The 162nd Ohio Infantry Regiment, sometimes 162nd Ohio Volunteer Infantry (or 162nd OVI) was an infantry regiment in the Union Army during the American Civil War.

== Service ==
The 162nd Ohio Infantry was organized at Camp Chase in Columbus, Ohio, and mustered in May 20, 1864, for 100 days service under the command of Colonel Ephraim Ball.

Companies A, C, F, and K served duty at Tod Barracks, Columbus, Ohio, until September 4. Companies B, D, E, G, H, and I moved to Covington, Kentucky (two companies were given horses), June 11 and participated in the expedition to Carrollton, Kentucky, in search of Moses Webster's men. Served duty at Carrollton and Covington, recruiting for the 117th United States Colored Troops and arresting prominent Rebels until September.

The 162nd Ohio Infantry mustered out of service September 4, 1864, at Camp Chase.

== Ohio National Guard ==
Over 35,000 Ohio National Guardsmen were federalized and organized into regiments for 100 days service in May 1864. Shipped to the Eastern Theater, they were designed to be placed in "safe" rear areas to protect railroads and supply points, thereby freeing regular troops for Lt. Gen. Ulysses S. Grant’s push on the Confederate capital of Richmond, Virginia. As events transpired, many units found themselves in combat, stationed in the path of Confederate Gen. Jubal Early’s veteran Army of the Valley during its famed Valley Campaigns of 1864. Ohio Guard units met the battle-tested foe head on and helped blunt the Confederate offensive thereby saving Washington, D.C. from capture. Ohio National Guard units participated in the battles of Monacacy, Fort Stevens, Harpers Ferry, and in the siege of Petersburg.

== Casualties ==
The regiment lost 20 enlisted men during service, all due to disease.

== Commanders ==
- Colonel Ephraim Ball

== See also ==
- List of Ohio Civil War units
- Ohio in the Civil War
