= 163rd Ohio Infantry Regiment =

- Active: May 12, 1864, to September 10, 1864
- Country: United States
- Allegiance: Union
- Branch: Infantry

The 163rd Ohio Infantry Regiment, sometimes 163rd Ohio Volunteer Infantry (or 163rd OVI) was an infantry regiment in the Union Army during the American Civil War.

== Service ==
The 163rd Ohio Infantry was organized at Camp Chase in Columbus, Ohio, and mustered in May 12, 1864, for 100 days service under the command of Colonel Hiram Miller.

The regiment left Ohio for Washington, D.C., May 13 and was assigned to 1st Brigade, Haskins' Division, XXII Corps, to June 1864. Served duty in the defenses of Washington, D.C., with headquarters at Fort Reno, until June 8. Moved to Bermuda Hundred, Virginia, June 8–12 and attached to 1st Brigade, 3rd Division, X Corps, Army of the James. Reconnaissance on the Petersburg & Richmond Railroad June 14–15. Skirmish on Petersburg and Richmond Turnpike June 15–16. Moved to Wilson's Landing June 16. Fatigue duty building Fort Pocahontas and scouting on west side of the James River until August. Ordered to Columbus, Ohio, August 29.

The 163rd Ohio Infantry mustered out of service September 10, 1864, at Camp Chase.

== Ohio National Guard ==
Over 35,000 Ohio National Guardsmen were federalized and organized into regiments for 100 days service in May 1864. Shipped to the Eastern Theater, they were designed to be placed in "safe" rear areas to protect railroads and supply points, thereby freeing regular troops for Lt. Gen. Ulysses S. Grant’s push on the Confederate capital of Richmond, Virginia. As events transpired, many units found themselves in combat, stationed in the path of Confederate Gen. Jubal Early’s veteran Army of the Valley during its famed Valley Campaigns of 1864. Ohio Guard units met the battle-tested foe head on and helped blunt the Confederate offensive thereby saving Washington, D.C. from capture. Ohio National Guard units participated in the battles of Monacacy, Fort Stevens, Harpers Ferry, and in the siege of Petersburg.

== Casualties ==
The regiment lost 29 enlisted men during service, all due to disease.

== Commanders ==
- Colonel Hiram Miller
- Sergeant Albert Gettings

== See also ==
- List of Ohio Civil War units
- Ohio in the Civil War
