= 154th Ohio Infantry Regiment =

- Active: 9 May 1864 – 1 September 1864
- Country: United States
- Allegiance: Union
- Branch: Union Army
- Type: Infantry
- Size: Regiment (~842 men)
- Garrison/HQ: New Creek, West Virginia
- Engagements: American Civil War: Skirmish near Moorefield (4 June 1864); Action at New Creek (4 August 1864)

Commanders
- Notable commanders: Colonel Robert Stevenson

The 154th Ohio Infantry Regiment, also known as the 154th Ohio Volunteer Infantry (154th OVI), was an infantry regiment in the Union Army during the American Civil War. Organized from Ohio National Guard units in Greene and Madison counties for 100 days' service, it mustered in at Camp Dennison, near Cincinnati, on 9 May 1864 with approximately 842 men under Colonel Robert Stevenson.

The regiment served in the Department of West Virginia, garrisoning New Creek and Greenland Gap in West Virginia, along the Baltimore and Ohio Railroad. Its principal engagement was the defense of New Creek on 4 August 1864, when the garrison repulsed a Confederate force of roughly 3,000 men under Brigadier General John McCausland that had recently burned Chambersburg, Pennsylvania. The regiment also fought a skirmish near Moorefield, West Virginia, on 4 June against McNeill's Rangers and conducted extensive scouting operations in territory infested with guerrilla bands.

The regiment lost four killed and nine wounded in the 4 June skirmish, one man killed and four wounded at New Creek, and three to disease. After the Action at New Creek, the regiment escorted Confederate prisoners captured at the Battle of Moorefield to Camp Chase in Columbus. It mustered out on 1 September 1864, having served 121 days—21 beyond its contracted term. Brigadier General Benjamin F. Kelley praised the regiment's service, calling the defense of New Creek "one of the most disastrous repulses in the history of the war."

== Organization ==
On 23 April 1864, the governors of Ohio, Indiana, Illinois, Iowa, and Wisconsin tendered 100,000 men for 100 days' service to relieve veteran troops for Lieutenant General Ulysses S. Grant's spring offensives. Ohio contributed 41 regiments totaling some 34,000 men. Confederate General Jubal Early recognized the program's strategic effect, noting that these short-service troops "enabled Grant to put in the field a large number of troops which had been employed on garrison and local duty."

The 154th Ohio was formed from the 60th Regiment, Ohio National Guard, from Greene County, and the 23rd Battalion, Ohio National Guard, from Madison County. The 60th Regiment, roughly 700 men under Colonel Stevenson, assembled at Xenia on 2 May 1864. The following day, the regiment formed before the county courthouse, where women of the Clark Run district presented a silk national flag. It then departed for Camp Dennison by rail.

At Camp Dennison the regiment was redesignated the 154th Ohio Volunteer Infantry and augmented to ten companies by the addition of the 23rd Battalion. The men turned in the militia muskets they had drilled with—which Stipp described as being "of questionable qualities"—and were issued new Enfield rifles along with full field equipment including blankets and knapsacks. Governor John Brough and Adjutant General R. B. Cowan reviewed the regiment before its departure. It mustered in on 9 May 1864 with an aggregate strength of 842.

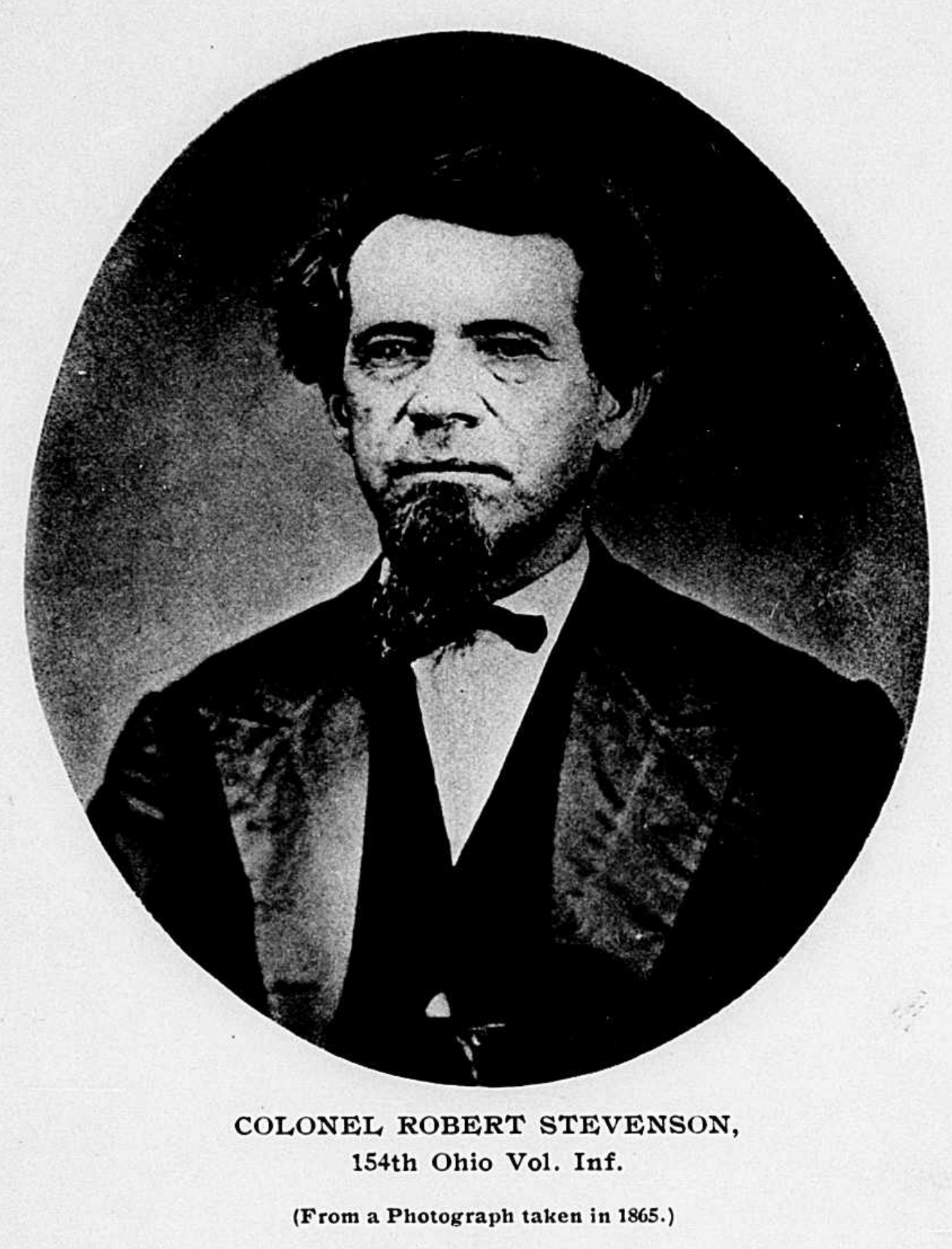
Colonel Robert Stevenson, from a photograph taken in 1865

Colonel Robert Stevenson, born near Xenia on 3 February 1823, had prior combat experience as a lieutenant in Company C of the 74th Ohio Volunteer Infantry, fighting at the Battle of Stones River in December 1862 and January 1863. He resigned that commission in February 1863 due to disabilities, but accepted election as colonel of the 60th Ohio National Guard when it was called into federal service.

Company origins and captains
Company	Origin	Captain
A	Yellow Springs, Greene County	James B. Corry
B	Xenia, Greene County	Andrew C. Miller
C	West Jefferson, Madison County	Alexander Swanson
D	Alpha, Greene County	Henry B. Guthrie
E	Zimmerman, Greene County	Joseph F. Bouck
F	Xenia, Greene County	Richard H. King
G	Spring Valley, Greene County	John A. Seiss
H	Paintersville, Greene County	Joel Ary
I	London, Madison County	David Watson
K	Fairfield, Greene County	Uriah Wilson

Companies A through H and K were from the 60th Regiment, Ohio National Guard (Greene County). Companies C and I were from the 23rd Battalion, Ohio National Guard (Madison County).

== Service ==
=== New Creek and Greenland Gap ===
The regiment left Camp Dennison on 12 May, traveling by rail via Columbus and Bellaire, and reached New Creek, West Virginia, on the evening of 14 May. They pitched camp the following day amid a severe storm on low ground near the railroad station, roughly a mile from the post's fortifications.

New Creek (present-day Keyser) was a major supply depot on the Baltimore and Ohio Railroad, 22 miles southwest of Cumberland, Maryland, with extensive warehouses storing food, forage, and munitions for troops along the railroad. The post was defended by Fort Fuller, an earthwork mounting four heavy guns on the ridge above the town, and the older Fort Piano on the mountain to the south. The regiment was assigned to Brigadier General Benjamin F. Kelley's command in the Department of West Virginia.

Company F was detached to Piedmont, West Virginia, on 22 May, where it remained until late August. On 29 May, eight companies moved to Greenland Gap, 27 miles south of New Creek, while one company was posted to the Youghiogheny River bridge near Oakland, Maryland. Greenland Gap controlled the convergence of several roads leading to Moorefield, Petersburg, and other points south, and Kelley considered it essential to holding the surrounding area. The regiment camped on a hilltop commanding the gap, with two 12-pounder brass guns of Battery L, 1st Illinois Light Artillery, posted to the rear. The surrounding country was, in Stipp's words, "thoroughly infested with bands of guerrillas under command of McNeil, Harness, Mosby, Imboden, Jones, Rosser and others too numerous to mention."

=== Skirmish near Moorefield ===
On 4 June, a detachment of 126 men under Captain Joseph F. Bouck of Company E set out from Greenland Gap on a scouting expedition toward Moorefield. They marched through the night and linked up with a detachment of the Ringgold Cavalry under Captain Hart at Walnut Knob. About 9 a.m., carbine fire erupted ahead. The infantry advanced at the double-quick with fixed bayonets and found McNeill's Rangers, reinforced by Captain Harness's company, holding the narrow mountain road in force. The Confederates occupied the road in dense formation as far as the Union troops could see.

After an initial exchange of fire, the detachment fell back and extended its right flank up the mountainside, deploying as skirmishers. From this higher ground they drove the Confederates from the road. The round-trip march from Greenland Gap and back covered 83 miles. The regiment lost 4 killed and 9 wounded. Kelley reported the engagement to his superiors: "Captain Hart, commanding a detachment of the 22nd Pennsylvania Cavalry, and two companies of the 154th O.V.I., had a severe engagement with McNeil and Harness, near Moorefield, yesterday. Our loss four killed and nine wounded, but drove the enemy to the mountains."

=== Scouting and withdrawal ===
The regiment continued active scouting from Greenland Gap throughout June and July. About 12 June, a force of 300 men with cavalry spent ten days patrolling the area; skirmishing was frequent, but the Confederates kept to the mountains and only three were captured. On 23 June, another scout of 100 men with cavalry went out for three days without making contact. On 4 July, the regiment withdrew to New Creek in expectation of an attack; when the threat did not materialize, it returned to Greenland Gap on 7 July. Company H, which had been posted at Oakland, rejoined at this time. On 25 July, the regiment permanently fell back to New Creek and Greenland Gap was abandoned as a military post.

=== Action at New Creek ===
After burning Chambersburg, Pennsylvania, on 30 July and being repulsed at Cumberland on 1 August, the Confederate brigades of Brigadier General John McCausland and Brigadier General Bradley T. Johnson—roughly 3,000 men—moved toward New Creek. At Romney, Captain John Hanson McNeill told McCausland the garrison numbered only about 300 men, and that a destroyed culvert on the railroad would prevent Kelley from sending reinforcements. Both estimates were wrong. Colonel Stevenson commanded approximately 1,000 troops—nine companies of the 154th Ohio (roughly 750 men), two companies of the 6th West Virginia Infantry, a mounted company of the 2nd Maryland Potomac Home Brigade, a section of Battery L (1st Illinois Light Artillery) under Lieutenant Charles Bagley, and Battery H (1st West Virginia Light Artillery) under Captain James H. Holmes manning the guns of Fort Fuller.

About 1 p.m. on 4 August, gunfire erupted at the outpost two miles south on the Moorefield road, and an officer galloped into camp to raise the alarm. Without waiting for the formal assembly, the men grabbed their rifles and formed up. Nine companies then ran the mile to Fort Fuller at the double-quick, with Stevenson riding ahead on horseback. Once at the fort, Companies A and B deployed as skirmishers to the right and left.

At 1:30 p.m., Stevenson telegraphed Kelley at Cumberland that the attacking force was larger than McNeill's rangers and included infantry, cavalry, and artillery. Kelley ordered him to "fight them to the last" and dispatched reinforcements. He simultaneously wired Brigadier General Averell at Hancock, urging him "for God's sake" to advance, and warned General Couch at Pittsburgh that if New Creek fell, nothing would prevent the Confederates from reaching the Ohio River.

McCausland advanced in line of battle across the valley, stretching from the foot of the western hills to New Creek Mountain, a front of 300 to 400 yards. The attack was a three-pronged assault: Johnson moved directly up the New Creek road, McCausland sent a force to seize Fort Piano on the mountain, and roughly 400 dismounted men attempted to encircle Fort Fuller from the west. The guns of Fort Fuller, under Holmes and Bagley, checked Johnson's column. Companies A and G of the 6th West Virginia skirmished with the western flanking force for over two hours, pinning them in a stand of woods. McCausland's men occupied Fort Piano and pushed 300 to 400 troops partway down the mountainside toward Fort Fuller. About halfway down, they collided with soldiers of the 154th Ohio, and a fierce fight broke out on the steep slope. The fighting became general along the entire line.

About 4 p.m., four companies of the 11th West Virginia Infantry under Major Simpson arrived by train from Cumberland. Stevenson directed Simpson to retake Fort Piano. With Company L of the 6th West Virginia on their left, Simpson's men charged up the mountain and drove the Confederates out of the position. McCausland fell back to rifle pits on the southern face and brought up another regiment, temporarily forcing the Federals back down the slope. At that point the guns of Fort Fuller opened fire over the heads of the retreating Union troops, and the combined shelling and musketry forced McCausland to pull back again. With Johnson already pulling back, reinforcements arriving, and daylight fading, McCausland abandoned the attack. Sporadic firing continued until darkness ended the action.

The garrison remained under arms through the night. At first light on 5 August, Stevenson found that the Confederates had withdrawn. He sent a reconnaissance in force south along the Moorefield road as far as Burlington, confirming that McCausland was retreating rapidly toward Moorefield. The 156th Ohio arrived from Cumberland during the night or early the next morning, too late to take part in the fighting.

Confederate accounts acknowledged the failure. Jubal Early wrote that McCausland found the post "too strongly fortified to take by assault." Colonel Harry Gilmor, commanding the 2nd Maryland Battalion (CSA), called the expedition "foiled most signally" and estimated Confederate losses at forty to fifty men, blaming poor coordination and troops weighed down with plunder from Chambersburg. The failed attack delayed McCausland's retreat and allowed Averell to catch his force three days later at the Battle of Moorefield, where the Confederates were surprised in camp and routed, losing some 420 prisoners, four artillery pieces, and nearly 700 horses.

=== Prisoner escort and muster-out ===
After the Battle of Moorefield on 7 August, Averell's cavalry sent 458 prisoners to New Creek, including 6 field and staff officers and 32 cavalry officers. The garrison fired an artillery salute when Averell's column arrived. On 9 August, a detachment of the 154th Ohio under Captain Andrew C. Miller of Company B escorted the prisoners by rail to Wheeling, West Virginia, from where they were forwarded to Camp Chase in Columbus.

The regiment's 100-day term had technically expired, but on 19 August, Kelley informed Stevenson that the War Department had directed the hundred-days regiments be retained pending further orders. The 145th, 152nd, and 156th Ohio all sent protests to Governor Brough; the 154th Ohio did not. On 25 August, Kelley wrote a farewell letter to Stevenson:

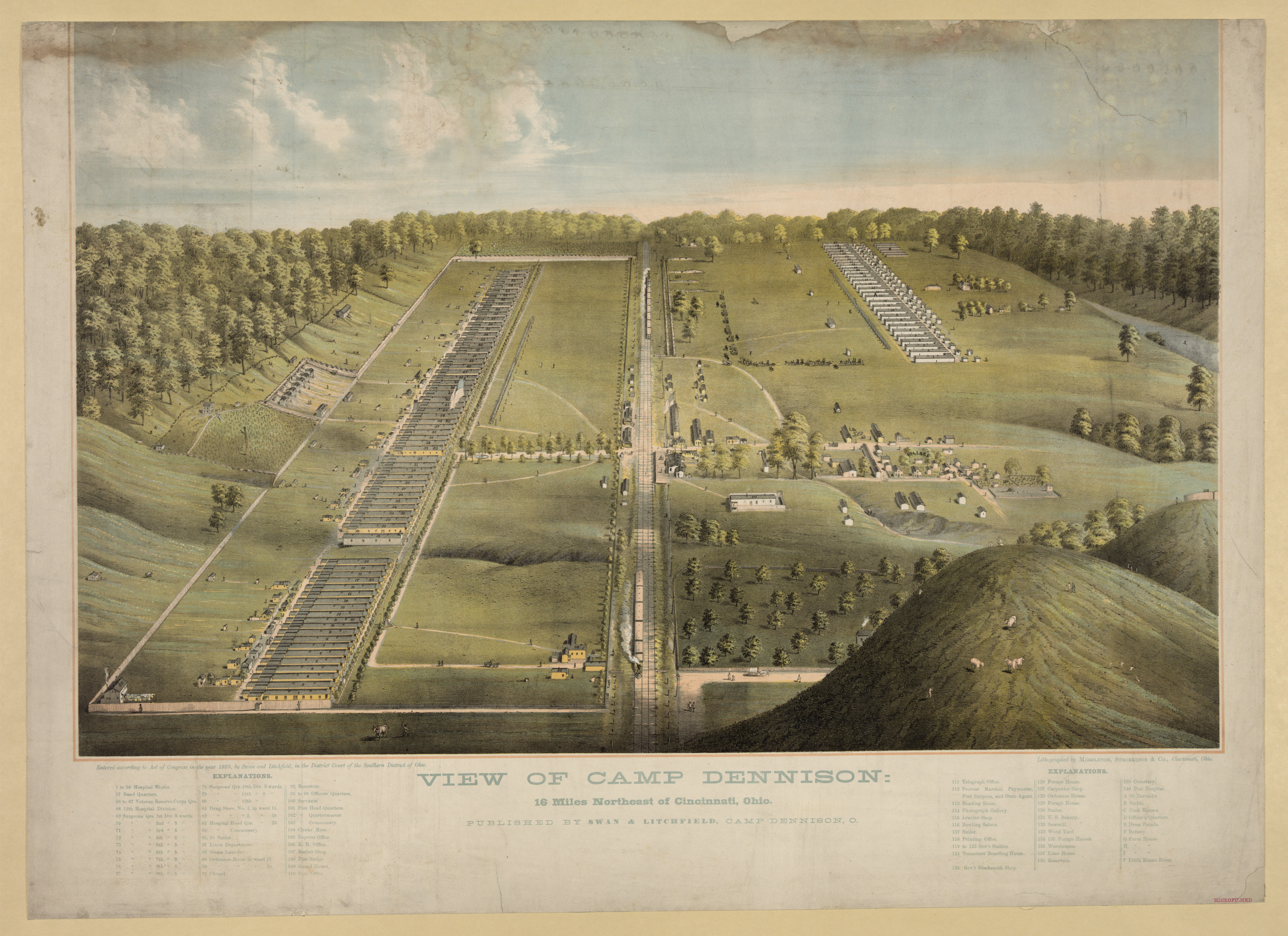
Camp Dennison, Ohio, where the regiment mustered in and out

The term of service of your regiment having expired, and being on the eve of your departure for Ohio, preparatory to being mustered out of the service, I accept the opportunity offered of expressing to yourself and the officers and men of your regiment my thanks for the eminent service you have rendered the country while in my command. Always ready, your faithfulness has only been equalled by your willingness on being called upon to pass through the ordeal of battle. Even in your short term of service your bravery and unfaltering courage were nobly attested. You can return, Colonel, to your home with the proud satisfaction of knowing that while you relieved the veteran troops for duty at the front, it was your pleasant duty to be participants at New Creek, W. Va., August 4th, 1864, in administering to the enemies of our government one of the most disastrous repulses in the history of the war.

— Brigadier General B. F. Kelley, 25 August 1864

Departing New Creek on 22 August, the 154th Ohio arrived at Camp Dennison on 27 August and mustered out on 1 September 1864, having served 121 days.

== Casualties ==
In the skirmish near Moorefield on 4 June, the regiment lost 4 killed and 9 wounded. At the Action at New Creek on 4 August, the regiment suffered 1 mortally wounded, 4 slightly wounded, and 3 captured. Private Joseph Baldwin of Company A was mortally wounded and died on 8 August. Corporal David Stutsman of Company K was captured on picket and died as a prisoner of war at Salisbury, North Carolina, on 14 February 1865. Two other men captured on picket, Privates George Carlisle of Company A and David Williams of Company B, were recaptured when Averell routed McCausland at Moorefield three days later. Three men died of disease during the regiment's service.

== Aftermath ==
On 13 August 1864, Fort Fuller was renamed Fort Kelley in honor of General Kelley's defense of Cumberland and New Creek, and Kelley was breveted major general of volunteers. Three months after the 154th Ohio mustered out, Confederate General Thomas L. Rosser surprised and captured New Creek on 28 November 1864, taking roughly 700 prisoners and large quantities of stores with virtually no resistance. Kelley, who had warned the post's new commander to exercise proper vigilance, drew an explicit contrast between the August defense and the November surrender.

Joseph A. Stipp, a veteran of the regiment who later reenlisted and served until the end of the war, wrote the only full-length regimental history. Originally delivered as a paper at the Annual Reunion of the Regimental Association in Xenia on 13 August 1895, it was published the following year at the urging of surviving comrades.

== See also ==
- Hundred Days Men
- List of Ohio Civil War units
- Ohio in the American Civil War
- Baltimore and Ohio Railroad
- Battle of Moorefield
- Valley campaigns of 1864

== Bibliography ==
- Bushong, Millard K. (1955). Old Jube: A Biography of General Jubal A. Early. Boyce, VA: Carr Publishing Company.
- Dyer, Frederick H. (1908). A Compendium of the War of the Rebellion. Des Moines, IA: Dyer Publishing Co.
- Early, Jubal Anderson (1989). Jubal Early's Memoirs: Autobiographical Sketch and Narrative of the War Between the States. introduction by Craig L. Symonds. Baltimore: Nautical & Aviation Publishing Co. of America. ISBN 978-0-933852-96-9.. Original 1912 edition at the Internet Archive.
- Evans, Clement A. (1899). Evans, Clement A. (ed.). Confederate Military History. Vol. 2. Atlanta: Confederate Publishing Co.
- Gilmor, Harry (1866). Four Years in the Saddle. New York: Harper and Brothers.
- Haselberger, Fritz (2000). Confederate Retaliation: McCausland's 1864 Raid. Shippensburg, PA: Burd Street Press. ISBN 978-1-57249-113-7.
- Ohio Roster Commission (1893). Official Roster of the Soldiers of the State of Ohio in the War of the Rebellion, 1861–1866. Vol. 9. Akron, OH: Werner Co.
- Owens, Ira S. (1872). Greene County in the War. Xenia, OH: Torchlight Job Rooms.
- Reid, Whitelaw (1895). Ohio in the War: Her Statesmen, Generals, and Soldiers. Vol. 2. Cincinnati: Robert Clarke Co.
- Stipp, Joseph A. (1896). The History and Service of the 154th Ohio Volunteer Infantry. Toledo, OH: Hadley & Fullagar.. Available on microfilm via FamilySearch (free account required).
- "The Fight at New Creek--A Rebel Attack Gallantly Repulsed--McCausland and Bradley Johnson Defeated--The Dead and Wounded". Wheeling Daily Intelligencer. Wheeling, West Virginia. 8 August 1864. p. 2.
