= 146th Ohio Infantry Regiment =

- Active: May 12, 1864, to September 7, 1864
- Country: United States
- Allegiance: Union
- Branch: Union Army
- Type: Infantry

The 146th Ohio Infantry Regiment, sometimes 146th Ohio Volunteer Infantry (or 146th OVI) was an infantry regiment in the Union Army during the American Civil War.

== Service ==
The 146th Ohio Infantry was organized at Camp Chase in Columbus, Ohio, and mustered in May 12, 1864, for 100 days service under the command of Colonel Harvey Crampton.

The regiment left Ohio for Charleston, West Virginia, May 17; then moved to Fayetteville, West Virginia, where it served garrison duty until August 27. Companies A and H were detached at Camp Chase, Ohio, to guard prisoners. The regiment then moved to Camp Platt, West Virginia, August 27.

The 146th Ohio Infantry mustered out of service September 7, 1864, at Camp Dennison near Cincinnati, Ohio.

== Ohio National Guard ==
Over 35,000 Ohio National Guardsmen were federalized and organized into regiments for 100 days service in May 1864. Shipped to the Eastern Theater, they were designed to be placed in "safe" rear areas to protect railroads and supply points, thereby freeing regular troops for Lt. Gen. Ulysses S. Grant’s push on the Confederate capital of Richmond, Virginia. As events transpired, many units found themselves in combat, stationed in the path of Confederate Gen. Jubal Early’s veteran Army of the Valley during its famed Valley Campaigns of 1864. Ohio Guard units met the battle-tested foe head on and helped blunt the Confederate offensive thereby saving Washington, D.C. from capture. Ohio National Guard units participated in the battles of Monacacy, Fort Stevens, Harpers Ferry, and in the siege of Petersburg.

The 146th OVI was formed from the 31st regiment of the Ohio National Guard along with two companies from the 35th regiment of the Ohio National Guard.

== Casualties ==
The regiment lost 8 enlisted men during service, all due to disease.

== Commanders ==
- Colonel Harvey Crampton

== See also ==
- List of Ohio Civil War units
- Ohio in the Civil War
