= 160th Regiment =

160th Regiment may refer to:

- 160th Special Operations Aviation Regiment (Airborne)
- 160th Field Artillery Regiment
- 160th Infantry Regiment (United States)
- 160th Regiment Royal Armoured Corps
- 160th Regiment State Armory
- 160 Transport Regiment RLC

== American Civil War regiments ==
- 160th New York Infantry Regiment
- 160th Ohio Infantry Regiment

== See also ==
- 160th Division (disambiguation)
