= 140th Ohio Infantry Regiment =

- Active: May 10, 1864, to September 3, 1864
- Country: United States
- Allegiance: Union
- Branch: Infantry

The 140th Ohio Infantry Regiment, sometimes 140th Ohio Volunteer Infantry (or 140th OVI) was an infantry regiment in the Union Army during the American Civil War.

== Service ==
The 140th Ohio Infantry was organized in Gallipolis, Ohio, and mustered in May 10, 1864, for 100 days service under the command of Colonel Robert B. Wilson.

The regiment left Ohio for Charleston, West Virginia, May 10. Assigned to duty as garrison at Charleston and on guard duty along the Kanawha and Gauley Rivers until September.

The 140th Ohio Infantry mustered out of service September 3, 1864, at Gallipolis.

== Ohio National Guard ==
Over 35,000 Ohio National Guardsmen were federalized and organized into regiments for 100 days service in May 1864. Shipped to the Eastern Theater, they were designed to be placed in "safe" rear areas to protect railroads and supply points, thereby freeing regular troops for Lt. Gen. Ulysses S. Grant’s push on the Confederate capital of Richmond, Virginia. As events transpired, many units found themselves in combat, stationed in the path of Confederate Gen. Jubal Early’s veteran Army of the Valley during its famed Valley Campaigns of 1864. Ohio Guard units met the battle-tested foe head on and helped blunt the Confederate offensive thereby saving Washington, D.C. from capture. Ohio National Guard units participated in the battles of Monacacy, Fort Stevens, Harpers Ferry, and in the siege of Petersburg.

== Casualties ==
The regiment lost 2 enlisted men during service, both due to disease.

== Commanders ==
- Colonel Robert B. Wilson

== See also ==
- List of Ohio Civil War units
- Ohio in the Civil War
