= 148th Ohio Infantry Regiment =

- Active: May 17, 1864, to September 14, 1864
- Country: United States
- Allegiance: Union
- Branch: Union Army
- Type: Infantry
- Engagements: American Civil War: City Point explosion

Insignia
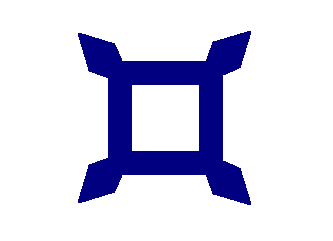
- 3rd Division, X Corps

The 148th Ohio Infantry Regiment, sometimes 148th Ohio Volunteer Infantry Regiment (or 148th OVI) was an infantry regiment in the Union Army during the American Civil War.

== Service ==
The 148th Ohio Infantry was organized in Marietta, Ohio, and mustered on May 17, 1864, for 100 days service under the command of Colonel Thomas W. Moore.

The regiment left Ohio for Harpers Ferry, West Virginia, May 23; then moved to Washington, D.C., June 1, and to White House Landing, Virginia, June 9. Moved to Bermuda Hundred, Virginia, June 11, and to City Point June 15. It was attached to 1st Brigade, 3rd Division, X Corps, Army of the James. On August 9, 1864, while the regiment was stationed at City Point, Virginia, a successful Confederate sabotage attempt occurred there, which was later called the City Point explosion. The 148th Ohio served duty at City Point until August 29 then moved to Marietta September 5.

The 148th Ohio Infantry mustered out of service September 14, 1864, at Marietta.

== Ohio National Guard ==
Over 35,000 Ohio National Guardsmen were federalized and organized into regiments for 100 days service in May 1864. Shipped to the Eastern Theater, they were designed to be placed in "safe" rear areas to protect railroads and supply points, thereby freeing regular troops for Lt. Gen. Ulysses S. Grant’s push on the Confederate capital of Richmond, Virginia. As events transpired, many units found themselves in combat, stationed in the path of Confederate Gen. Jubal Early’s veteran Army of the Valley during its famed Valley Campaigns of 1864. Ohio Guard units met the battle-tested foe head on and helped blunt the Confederate offensive thereby saving Washington, D.C. from capture. Ohio National Guard units participated in the battles of Monacacy, Fort Stevens, Harpers Ferry, and in the siege of Petersburg.

== Casualties ==
The regiment lost 39 men during service; 2 officer and 37 enlisted men, all due to disease.

== Commanders ==
- Colonel Thomas W. Moore

== See also ==
- List of Ohio Civil War units
- Ohio in the Civil War
