= 170th Ohio Infantry Regiment =

- Active: May 13, 1864 - September 10, 1864
- Country: United States
- Allegiance: Union
- Branch: Infantry
- Engagements: Battle of Fort Stevens; Second Battle of Kernstown

The 170th Ohio Infantry Regiment, sometimes 170th Ohio Volunteer Infantry (or 170th OVI) was an infantry regiment in the Union Army during the American Civil War.

== Service ==
The 170th Ohio Infantry was organized in Bellaire, Ohio, and mustered in May 13, 1864, for 100 days service under the command of Colonel Miles J. Saunders.

The regiment left Ohio for Washington, D.C., May 17 and was attached to 2nd Brigade, Haskins' Division, XXII Corps, to July 1864, and assigned to garrison duty at Fort Simmons, Fort Bayard, Fort Mansfield, Fort Gaines, and Battery Vermont in the defenses of Washington, until July 4. Moved to Sandy Hook, Maryland, July 4, and served duty in the defenses of Maryland Heights until July 15. Attached to Reserve Division, Department of West Virginia. Operations in the Shenandoah Valley July 15-August 24. Expedition to Snicker's Ford July 17–18. Rocky Ford July 18. Second Battle of Kernstown, July 24. Martinsburg July 25. Moved to Frederick, Maryland, July 30; then guarded supply trains to Harpers Ferry, serving there until August 24.

The 170th Ohio Infantry mustered out of service September 10, 1864.

== Ohio National Guard ==
Over 35,000 Ohio National Guardsmen were federalized and organized into regiments for 100 days service in May 1864. Shipped to the Eastern Theater, they were designed to be placed in "safe" rear areas to protect railroads and supply points, thereby freeing regular troops for Lt. Gen. Ulysses S. Grant’s push on the Confederate capital of Richmond, Virginia. As events transpired, many units found themselves in combat, stationed in the path of Confederate Gen. Jubal Early’s veteran Army of the Valley during its famed Valley Campaigns of 1864. Ohio Guard units met the battle-tested foe head on and helped blunt the Confederate offensive thereby saving Washington, D.C. from capture. Ohio National Guard units participated in the battles of Monacacy, Fort Stevens, Harpers Ferry, and in the siege of Petersburg.

== Casualties ==
The regiment lost 24 men during service; 4 killed or mortally wounded, 1 officer and 19 enlisted men due to disease.

== Commanders ==
- Colonel Miles J. Saunders

== See also ==
- List of Ohio Civil War units
- Ohio in the Civil War
