= 160th Ohio Infantry Regiment =

160th Ohio Infantry Regiment (National Guard)
- Active: May 12, 1864, to September 07, 1864
- Country: United States
- Allegiance: Union
- Branch: Infantry

The 160th Ohio Infantry Regiment, sometimes 160th Ohio Volunteer Infantry Regiment (National Guard) (or 160th OVI (NG)) was an infantry regiment in the Union Army during the American Civil War.

== Service ==
Organized on May 7, 1864, at Camp Zanesville in Zanesville, Ohio, the 160th OVI was composed of elements from four battalions of the Ohio National Guard - the 40th Battalion of Brown County, the 53rd Battalion of Perry County, the 73rd Battalion of Fairfield County, and the 91st Battalion of Muskingum County. The regiment formally mustered into service on May 13, 1864, under the command of Colonel Cyrus Reasoner and departed for Harpers Ferry, West Virginia. Assigned to the First Brigade (Colonel Augustus Moor) of the First Division (Brigadier General Jeremiah Sullivan) of the Department of West Virginia (Major General Franz Sigel), the regiment received orders to the front on May 17, 1864, with a supply train of 200 wagons intended for the division encampment at Cedar Creek, Virginia. The regiment conducted picket and garrison duty until reassigned on May 25 to the newly formed Reserve Division (Major General Franz Sigel), Department of West Virginia (Major General David Hunter). The regiment conducted operations throughout the lower Shenandoah Valley in support of wagon trains and on multiple occasions engaged Confederate guerrilla forces under the command of Colonel Harry W. Gillmor and Colonel John S. Mosby. Notable engagements occurred on May 29–30 at Newtown, Virginia and on June 7 at Middletown, Virginia. The regiment proceeded to conduct operations in and about Harpers Ferry, West Virginia and Martinsburg, West Virginia. From July 3 to 7, the regiment participated in delaying maneuvers and the defense of Maryland Heights, Maryland during Lieutenant General Jubal Early's invasion of Washington, D.C., with the Confederate Army of the Valley. On July 14, the regiment conducted a 27-mile single day's march to Hagerstown, Maryland where it took charge of a wagon train full of necessary supplies for renewed operations across the theatre. On July 21, the regiment marched to Brown's Crossing, West Virginia and established a network of pickets and patrols along the segment of the Baltimore and Ohio Railroad running between Harper's Ferry and Martinsburg. Under its guard, the railroad line resumed operations for the first time since July 3, 1864. The regiment additionally played an instrumental role in the completion of the strategic breastworks along Bolivar Heights in Harper's Ferry. On August 25, 1864, having exceeded its term of enlistment, the regiment received orders to return home. The 160th OVI mustered out of service on September 7, 1864, at Camp Goddard in Zanesville, Ohio.

== Ohio National Guard ==
Over 35,000 Ohio National Guardsmen were federalized and organized into regiments for 100 days service in May 1864. Shipped to the Eastern Theater, they were designed to be placed in "safe" rear areas to protect railroads and supply points, thereby freeing regular troops for Lt. Gen. Ulysses S. Grant’s push on the Confederate capital of Richmond, Virginia. As events transpired, many units found themselves in combat, stationed in the path of Confederate Gen. Jubal Early’s veteran Army of the Valley during its famed Valley Campaigns of 1864. Ohio Guard units met the battle-tested foe head on and helped blunt the Confederate offensive thereby saving Washington, D.C., from capture. Ohio National Guard units participated in the battles of Monacacy, Fort Stevens, Harpers Ferry, and in the siege of Petersburg.

== Casualties ==
The regiment suffered 20 casualties during its term of service; five men killed in action, two men wounded in action, one man captured who later died as a prisoner of war, and 12 men who died due to disease.

Killed in Action: Private John J. Stewart (July 4, 1864, Sandy Hook, Maryland); Private Isaac N. Steers (July 31, 1864, Frederick, Maryland from wounds received on July 9, 1864, at Monocacy, Maryland); Private Peter Beth (August 13, 1864, Maryland Heights, Maryland); Private Isaac Kelly (August 13, 1864, Maryland Heights, Maryland); and Private George States (August 13, 1864, Maryland Heights, Maryland).

Wounded in Action: Principal Musician Thomas Jackson (May 28, 1864, Newtown, Virginia); Corporal Josiah Petty (July 7, 1864, Maryland Heights, Maryland).

Captured: Sergeant James M. Marlow (August 5, 1864, Brown's Crossing, West Virginia; Died as Prisoner-of-War on February 1, 1865 in Richmond, Virginia).

Died of Disease: Private John T. Dutro (June 21, 1864, Martinsburg, West Virginia); Private Thomas Fry (June 30, 1864, Martinsburg, West Virginia); Corporal Isaiah M. White (July 7, 1864, Frederick, Maryland); Private Charles W. Smith (July 16, 1864, Frederick, Maryland); Private Josiah McLees (July 20, 1864, Frederick, Maryland); Corporal Lyman C. Lamb (August 16, 1864, Annapolis, Maryland); Commissary Sergeant Nathan S. Kelley (August 17, 1864, Baltimore, Maryland); Sergeant Andrew J. Wright (August 18, 1864, Maryland Heights, Maryland); Private Andrew Garrett (August 19, 1864, Maryland Heights, Maryland); Private Samuel Anderson (August 28, 1864, Crestline, Ohio); Private John Prall (August 30, 1864, Columbus, Ohio); and 2nd Lieutenant Isaac T. Cramer (September 5, 1864, Zanesville, Ohio).

== Commanders ==
- Colonel Cyrus Reasoner
- Lieutenant Colonel David W.D. Marsh
- Major Henry L. Harbaugh
- Captain Samuel Lyons (Company A)
- Captain Andrew J. Tharp (Company B)
- Captain William H. Spencer (Company C)
- Captain Matthias R. Trace (Company D)
- Captain Simeon Seigfried Jr. (Company E)
- Captain David C. Fowler (Company F)
- Captain Henry C. Greiner (Company G)
- Captain George Ritchey (Company H)
- Captain Henry S. Finley (Company I)
- Captain George McDonough (Company K)

== See also ==
- List of Ohio Civil War units
- Ohio in the Civil War
