= 166th Ohio Infantry Regiment =

- Active: May 13, 1864, to September 9, 1864
- Country: United States
- Allegiance: Union
- Branch: Infantry

The 166th Ohio Infantry Regiment, sometimes 166th Ohio Volunteer Infantry (or 166th OVI) was an infantry regiment in the Union Army during the American Civil War.

== Service ==
The 166th Ohio Infantry was organized at Camp Taylor near Cleveland, Ohio, and mustered in May 13, 1864, for 100 days service under the command of Colonel Harrison Gray Otis Blake.

The regiment left Ohio for Washington, D.C., May 15 and was attached to 2nd Brigade, DeRussy's Division, XXII Corps, to July 1864. 3rd Brigade, DeRussy's Division, XXII Corps, to August 1864. Assigned to garrison duty at Fort Richardson, Fort Barnard, Fort Reynolds, Fort Ward, and Fort Worth (with regimental headquarters at Fort Richardson), defenses of Washington south of the Potomac River, until September. Participated in the repulse of Early's attack on Washington July 11–12.

The 166th Ohio Infantry mustered out of service September 9, 1864.

== Ohio National Guard ==
Over 35,000 Ohio National Guardsmen were federalized and organized into regiments for 100 days service in May 1864. Shipped to the Eastern Theater, they were designed to be placed in "safe" rear areas to protect railroads and supply points, thereby freeing regular troops for Lt. Gen. Ulysses S. Grant’s push on the Confederate capital of Richmond, Virginia. As events transpired, many units found themselves in combat, stationed in the path of Confederate Gen. Jubal Early’s veteran Army of the Valley during its famed Valley Campaigns of 1864. Ohio Guard units met the battle-tested foe head on and helped blunt the Confederate offensive thereby saving Washington, D.C. from capture. Ohio National Guard units participated in the battles of Monacacy, Fort Stevens, Harpers Ferry, and in the siege of Petersburg.

== Casualties ==
The regiment lost 29 enlisted men during service, all due to disease.

== Commanders ==
- Colonel Harrison Gray Otis Blake

== Notable members ==
- Colonel Harrison Gray Otis Blake - U.S. Representative from Ohio, 1859-1863

== See also ==
- List of Ohio Civil War units
- Ohio in the Civil War
