= 152nd Ohio Infantry Regiment =

- Active: May 11, 1864, to September 2, 1864
- Country: United States
- Allegiance: Union
- Branch: Infantry

The 152nd Ohio Infantry Regiment, sometimes 152nd Ohio Volunteer Infantry (or 152nd OVI) was an infantry regiment in the Union Army during the American Civil War.

== Service ==
The 152nd Ohio Infantry was organized at Camp Dennison near Cincinnati, Ohio, and mustered on May 11, 1864, for 100 days service under the command of Colonel David Putnam.

The regiment left Ohio for New Creek, West Virginia, May 15; then moved to Martinsburg, West Virginia, and served duty there until June. Marched with a supply train of 199 wagons from Martinsburg to Beverly (430 miles) June 4–27. Action at Greenbrier Gap June 22. Sweet White Sulphur June 23. Moved to Cumberland, Maryland, June 29. Duty along Baltimore & Ohio Railroad and at Cumberland until August 25. Attached to Reserve Division, Department of West Virginia. Ordered to Camp Dennison, Ohio, August 25.

The 152nd Ohio Infantry mustered out of service September 2, 1864, at Camp Dennison.

== Ohio National Guard ==
Over 35,000 Ohio National Guardsmen were federalized and organized into regiments for 100 days service in May 1864. Shipped to the Eastern Theater, they were designed to be placed in "safe" rear areas to protect railroads and supply points, thereby freeing regular troops for Lt. Gen. Ulysses S. Grant’s push on the Confederate capital of Richmond, Virginia. As events transpired, many units found themselves in combat, stationed in the path of Confederate Gen. Jubal Early’s veteran Army of the Valley during its famed Valley Campaigns of 1864. Ohio Guard units met the battle-tested foe head on and helped blunt the Confederate offensive thereby saving Washington, D.C. from capture. Ohio National Guard units participated in the battles of Monacacy, Fort Stevens, Harpers Ferry, and in the siege of Petersburg.

The 152nd OVI was formed from the 28th regiment of the Ohio National Guard along with two companies from the 35th regiment of the Ohio National Guard.

== Casualties ==
The regiment lost 21 enlisted men during service; 1 man killed and 20 men due to disease.

== Commanders ==
- Colonel David Putnam

== See also ==
- List of Ohio Civil War units
- Ohio in the Civil War
