= 167th Ohio Infantry Regiment =

- Active: May 14, 1864, to September 8, 1864
- Country: United States
- Allegiance: Union
- Branch: Infantry

The 167th Ohio Infantry Regiment, sometimes 167th Ohio Volunteer Infantry (or 167th OVI) was an infantry regiment in the Union Army during the American Civil War.

== Service ==
The 167th Ohio Infantry was organized in Hamilton, Ohio, and mustered on May 14, 1864, for 100 days service under the command of Colonel Thomas Moore.

The regiment left Ohio for Charleston, West Virginia, May 18. Six companies moved to Camp Platt May 22, and four companies to Gauley Bridge. All served duty at these points guarding supply trains and stores until September.

The 167th Ohio Infantry mustered out of service September 8, 1864.

== Ohio National Guard ==
Over 35,000 Ohio National Guardsmen were federalized and organized into regiments for 100 days service in May 1864. Shipped to the Eastern Theater, they were designed to be placed in "safe" rear areas to protect railroads and supply points, thereby freeing regular troops for Lt. Gen. Ulysses S. Grant’s push on the Confederate capital of Richmond, Virginia. As events transpired, many units found themselves in combat, stationed in the path of Confederate Gen. Jubal Early’s veteran Army of the Valley during its famed Valley Campaigns of 1864. Ohio Guard units met the battle-tested foe head on and helped blunt the Confederate offensive thereby saving Washington, D.C. from capture. Ohio National Guard units participated in the battles of Monacacy, Fort Stevens, Harpers Ferry, and in the siege of Petersburg.

== Casualties ==
The regiment lost 5 enlisted men during service, all due to disease.

== Commanders ==
- Colonel Thomas Moore

== See also ==
- List of Ohio Civil War units
- Ohio in the Civil War
