= 165th Regiment =

165th Regiment may refer to:

- 165th Infantry Regiment (United States), also known as the 69th New York Infantry Regiment
- 165th New York Infantry Regiment
- 165th Ohio Infantry Regiment
- 165th Pennsylvania Infantry Regiment
