= 151st Ohio Infantry Regiment =

- Active: May 18, 1864, to August 27, 1864
- Country: United States
- Allegiance: Union
- Branch: Union Army
- Type: Infantry
- Engagements: Battle of Fort Stevens

The 151st Ohio Infantry Regiment, sometimes 151st Ohio Volunteer Infantry (or 151st OVI) was an infantry regiment in the Union Army during the American Civil War.

== Service ==
The 151st Ohio Infantry was organized at Camp Dennison near Cincinnati, Ohio, and mustered in May 18, 1864, for 100 days service under the command of Colonel John M. C. Marble.

The regiment left Ohio for Washington, D.C., May 14 and was attached to 2nd Brigade, Haskins' Division, XXII Corps, to July 1864. 1st Brigade, Haskins' Division, XXII Corps, to August 1864. Assigned to garrison duty at Fort Sumner, Fort Mansfield, and Fort Simmons until August 23. Companies C and G at Fort Stevens, Company I at Battery Smeade, Company K at Fort Kearney. Participated in the repulse of Early's attack on Washington, D.C., July 11–12. The regiment was concentrated at Fort Simmons August 17. Moved to Camp Chase, Columbus, Ohio, August 23.

The 151st Ohio Infantry mustered out of service August 27, 1864, at Camp Chase.

== Ohio National Guard ==
Over 35,000 Ohio National Guardsmen were federalized and organized into regiments for 100 days service in May 1864. Shipped to the Eastern Theater, they were designed to be placed in "safe" rear areas to protect railroads and supply points, thereby freeing regular troops for Lt. Gen. Ulysses S. Grant’s push on the Confederate capital of Richmond, Virginia. As events transpired, many units found themselves in combat, stationed in the path of Confederate Gen. Jubal Early’s veteran Army of the Valley during its famed Valley Campaigns of 1864. Ohio Guard units met the battle-tested foe head on and helped blunt the Confederate offensive thereby saving Washington, D.C. from capture. Ohio National Guard units participated in the battles of Monacacy, Fort Stevens, Harpers Ferry, and in the siege of Petersburg.

== Casualties ==
The regiment lost 10 enlisted men during service, all due to disease.

== Commanders ==
- Colonel John M. C. Marble

== See also ==
- List of Ohio Civil War units
- Ohio in the Civil War
