= 161st Ohio Infantry Regiment =

- Active: May 9, 1864, to September 2, 1864
- Country: United States
- Allegiance: Union
- Branch: Infantry

The 161st Ohio Infantry Regiment, sometimes 161st Ohio Volunteer Infantry (or 161st OVI) was an infantry regiment in the Union Army during the American Civil War.

== Service ==
The 161st Ohio Infantry was organized at Camp Chase in Columbus, Ohio, and mustered in May 9, 1864, for 100 days service under the command of Colonel Oliver P. Taylor.

The regiment left Ohio for Cumberland, Maryland, May 9, and served duty there until May 28. Attached to Reserve Division, Department of West Virginia. Moved to Martinsburg, West Virginia, May 28, and assigned to 1st Brigade, 1st Division, Department of West Virginia. Five companies were detached June 4 and assigned to duty in charge of supply trains for Hunter's Army. Hunter's Raid on Lynchburg June 6–25. Retreat to Martinsburg June 19–25. Moved to Beverly June 28, then to Webster June 30, and to Martinsburg July 2. Operations about Harpers Ferry July 4–7. Defense of Maryland Heights July 6–7. Duty in the defenses of Maryland Heights until August 25.

The 161st Ohio Infantry mustered out of service September 2, 1864.

== Ohio National Guard ==
Over 35,000 Ohio National Guardsmen were federalized and organized into regiments for 100 days service in May 1864. Shipped to the Eastern Theater, they were designed to be placed in "safe" rear areas to protect railroads and supply points, thereby freeing regular troops for Lt. Gen. Ulysses S. Grant’s push on the Confederate capital of Richmond, Virginia. As events transpired, many units found themselves in combat, stationed in the path of Confederate Gen. Jubal Early’s veteran Army of the Valley during its famed Valley Campaigns of 1864. Ohio Guard units met the battle-tested foe head on and helped blunt the Confederate offensive thereby saving Washington, D.C. from capture. Ohio National Guard units participated in the battles of Monacacy, Fort Stevens, Harpers Ferry, and in the siege of Petersburg.

== Casualties ==
The regiment lost 14 men during service; 1 enlisted man killed, 1 officer and 12 enlisted men due to disease.

== Commanders ==
- Colonel Oliver P. Taylor

== See also ==
- List of Ohio Civil War units
- Ohio in the Civil War
