= 169th Regiment =

169th Regiment may refer to:

- 169th Aviation Regiment, United States
- 169th Guards Anti-Aircraft Rocket Regiment, Soviet Union
- 169th Infantry Regiment (United States)

== American Civil War regiments ==
- 169th New York Infantry Regiment
- 169th Ohio Infantry Regiment
