= 147th Ohio Infantry Regiment =

- Active: May 16, 1864, to August 30, 1864
- Country: United States
- Allegiance: Union
- Branch: Union Army
- Type: Infantry
- Engagements: Battle of Fort Stevens

The 147th Ohio Infantry Regiment, sometimes 147th Ohio Volunteer Infantry (or 147th OVI) was an infantry regiment in the Union Army during the American Civil War.

== Service ==
The 147th Ohio Infantry was organized at Camp Chase in Columbus, Ohio, and mustered in May 16, 1864, for 100 days service under the command of Colonel Benjamin F. Rosson.

The regiment left Ohio for Washington, D.C., May 20 and was attached to 1st Brigade, DeRussy's Division, XXII Corps, to July. 2nd Brigade, DeHussy's Division, XXII Corps, to August. Assigned to garrison duty at Fort Ethan Allen, Fort Marcy, Fort Reno, and Fort Stevens, Defenses of Washington, until August 23. Repulse of Early's attack on Washington July 11–12.

The 147th Ohio Infantry mustered out of service August 30, 1864.

== Ohio National Guard ==
Over 35,000 Ohio National Guardsmen were federalized and organized into regiments for 100 days service in May 1864. Shipped to the Eastern Theater, they were designed to be placed in "safe" rear areas to protect railroads and supply points, thereby freeing regular troops for Lt. Gen. Ulysses S. Grant’s push on the Confederate capital of Richmond, Virginia. As events transpired, many units found themselves in combat, stationed in the path of Confederate Gen. Jubal Early’s veteran Army of the Valley during its famed Valley Campaigns of 1864. Ohio Guard units met the battle-tested foe head on and helped blunt the Confederate offensive thereby saving Washington, D.C. from capture. Ohio National Guard units participated in the battles of Monacacy, Fort Stevens, Harpers Ferry, and in the siege of Petersburg.

== Casualties ==
The regiment lost 22 enlisted men during service, all due to disease.

== Commanders ==
- Colonel Benjamin F. Rosson

== See also ==
- List of Ohio Civil War units
- Ohio in the Civil War
