= 156th Ohio Infantry Regiment =

- Active: May 15, 1864, to September 1, 1864
- Country: United States
- Allegiance: Union
- Branch: Infantry
- Engagements: Battle of Folck's Mill

The 156th Ohio Infantry Regiment, sometimes 156th Ohio Volunteer Infantry (or 156th OVI) was an infantry regiment in the Union Army during the American Civil War.

== Service ==
The 156th Ohio Infantry was organized at Camp Dennison near Cincinnati, Ohio, and mustered on May 15, 1864, for 100 days service under the command of Colonel Caleb Marker.

Companies A, B, C, D, E, F, and H moved to Cincinnati, May 20 and were engaged in guard and patrol duty in and about that city until July 18. Companies G, I, and K served guard and patrol duty at Camp Dennison until July then moved to Falmouth, Kentucky, later moving Covington, Kentucky, to rejoin the regiment on July 18. Moved to Cumberland, Maryland, July 28 and assigned to General Kelly's Command, Department of West Virginia. Served duty at Cumberland until August 28. Action near Folck's Mills, Cumberland, August 1.

The 156th Ohio Infantry mustered out of service September 1, 1864, at Camp Dennison.

== Ohio National Guard ==
Over 35,000 Ohio National Guardsmen were federalized and organized into regiments for 100 days service in May 1864. Shipped to the Eastern Theater, they were designed to be placed in "safe" rear areas to protect railroads and supply points, thereby freeing regular troops for Lt. Gen. Ulysses S. Grant’s push on the Confederate capital of Richmond, Virginia. As events transpired, many units found themselves in combat, stationed in the path of Confederate Gen. Jubal Early’s veteran Army of the Valley during its famed Valley Campaigns of 1864. Ohio Guard units met the battle-tested foe head on and helped blunt the Confederate offensive thereby saving Washington, D.C. from capture. Ohio National Guard units participated in the battles of Monacacy, Fort Stevens, Harpers Ferry, and in the siege of Petersburg.

== Casualties ==
The regiment lost 23 men during service; 1 officer and 22 enlisted men died due to disease.

== Commanders ==
- Colonel Caleb Marker

== See also ==
- List of Ohio Civil War units
- Ohio in the Civil War
