= 165th Ohio Infantry Regiment =

- Active: May 15, 1864, to August 31, 1864
- Country: United States
- Allegiance: Union
- Branch: Infantry

The 165th Ohio Infantry Regiment, sometimes 165th Ohio Volunteer Infantry (or 165th OVI) was an infantry regiment in the Union Army during the American Civil War.

== Service ==
The 165th Ohio Infantry was organized at Camp Dennison near Cincinnati, Ohio, and mustered in on May 15, 1864, for 100 days service under the command of Colonel Alexander Rohlander. The regiment only had enough men for eight companies.

The regiment served duty at Camp Dennison until May 20 then moved to Johnson's Island, Ohio, May 20, and served guard duty there until June 25. Moved to Kentucky June 25, and served duty there until August. Moved to Cumberland, Maryland, August 8, and served in Maryland and Virginia until August 27.

The 165th Ohio Infantry mustered out of service August 31, 1864, at Camp Dennison.

== Ohio National Guard ==
Over 35,000 Ohio National Guardsmen were federalized and organized into regiments for 100 days service in May 1864. Shipped to the Eastern Theater, they were designed to be placed in "safe" rear areas to protect railroads and supply points, thereby freeing regular troops for Lt. Gen. Ulysses S. Grant’s push on the Confederate capital of Richmond, Virginia. As events transpired, many units found themselves in combat, stationed in the path of Confederate Gen. Jubal Early’s veteran Army of the Valley during its famed Valley Campaigns of 1864. Ohio Guard units met the battle-tested foe head on and helped blunt the Confederate offensive thereby saving Washington, D.C. from capture. Ohio National Guard units participated in the battles of Monacacy, Fort Stevens, Harpers Ferry, and in the siege of Petersburg.

== Casualties ==
The regiment lost two enlisted men during service, both due to disease.

== Commanders ==
- Colonel Alexander Rohlander

== See also ==
- List of Ohio Civil War units
- Ohio in the Civil War
