= 161st Regiment =

161st Regiment may refer to:

- 161st Field Artillery Regiment
- 161st Infantry Regiment (United States)

== American Civil War regiments ==
- 161st New York Infantry Regiment
- 161st Ohio Infantry Regiment

== See also ==
- 161st Division (disambiguation)
