= 167th Regiment =

167th Regiment may refer to:

- 167th Infantry Regiment (United States)
- 167th Ohio Infantry Regiment, a regiment in the Union Army during the American Civil War
