= 141st Illinois Infantry Regiment =

1864 Union Army unit

141st Regiment Illinois Volunteer Infantry
- Illinois state flag
- Active: June 16, 1864, to October 27, 1864
- Country: United States
- Allegiance: Union
- Branch: Infantry

The 141st Regiment Illinois Volunteer Infantry was an infantry regiment that served in the Union Army during the American Civil War. It was among scores of regiments that were raised in the summer of 1864 as Hundred Days Men, an effort to augment existing manpower for an all-out push to end the war within 100 days.

== Service ==
The 141st Illinois Infantry was organized at Elgin, Illinois, and mustered into Federal service on June 16, 1864, for a one-hundred-day enlistment. The 141st served in garrisons in the Columbus, Kentucky, area.

The regiment was mustered out of service on October 27, 1864.

== Total strength and casualties ==
The regiment suffered a loss 30 enlisted to disease, but lost no men otherwise.

== Commanders ==
- Colonel Stephen Bronson - mustered out with the regiment.

== See also ==
- List of Illinois Civil War Units
- Illinois in the American Civil War
