= 159th Ohio Infantry Regiment =

- Active: May 9, 1864, to August 24, 1864
- Country: United States
- Allegiance: Union
- Branch: Infantry
- Engagements: Battle of Monocacy (detachment)

The 159th Ohio Infantry Regiment, sometimes 159th Ohio Volunteer Infantry (or 159th OVI) was an infantry regiment in the Union Army during the American Civil War.

== Service ==
The 159th Ohio Infantry was organized at Zanesville, Ohio, and mustered in as an Ohio National Guard unit for 100 days service on May 9, 1864, under the command of Colonel Lyman J. Jackson.

The regiment was attached to 3rd Separate Brigade, VIII Corps, Middle Department.

The 159th Ohio Infantry mustered out of service August 24, 1864.

== Detailed service ==
Left Ohio for Harper's Ferry, West Virginia, May 9. At Maryland Heights until May 17. Guard duty in the defenses of Baltimore, Maryland, and guarding bridges along Philadelphia, Wilmington & Baltimore Railroad by detachments until July. Battle of Monocacy Junction, Maryland, July 9. Expedition to Parkesville July 12. Companies B, E, G, and I guarded the railroad at Havre de Grace July 28 to August 13. Ordered home August 13.

== Casualties ==
The regiment lost a total of 10 enlisted men during service, all due to disease.

== Commanders ==
- Colonel Lyman J. Jackson
- Captain Edward H. Leib - commanded detachment at the battle of Monocacy

== See also ==
- List of Ohio Civil War units
- Ohio in the Civil War
