= 145th Illinois Infantry Regiment =

145th Regiment Illinois Volunteer Infantry
- Illinois state flag
- Active: June 9, 1864, to September 23, 1864
- Country: United States
- Allegiance: Union
- Branch: Infantry

The 145th Regiment Illinois Volunteer Infantry was an infantry regiment that served in the Union Army during the American Civil War. It was among scores of regiments that were raised in the summer of 1864 as Hundred Days Men, an effort to augment existing manpower for an all-out push to end the war within 100 days.

== Service ==
The 145th Illinois Infantry was organized at Camp Butler, Illinois, and mustered into Federal service on June 9, 1864, for a one-hundred-day enlistment. The 145th served in garrison in the Saint Louis, Missouri, area.

The regiment was mustered out of service on September 23, 1864.

== Total strength and casualties ==
The regiment suffered 40 enlisted men who died of disease, for a total of 40 fatalities.

== Commanders ==
- Colonel George W. Lackey - mustered out with the regiment.

== See also ==
- List of Illinois Civil War Units
- Illinois in the American Civil War
