= 144th Ohio Infantry Regiment =

- Active: May 11, 1864, to August 31, 1864
- Country: United States
- Allegiance: Union
- Branch: Union Army
- Type: Infantry
- Engagements: Battle of Monocacy (3 companies)

The 144th Ohio Infantry Regiment, sometimes 144th Ohio Volunteer Infantry (or 144th OVI) was an infantry regiment in the Union Army during the American Civil War.

== Service ==
The 144th Ohio Infantry was organized at Camp Chase in Columbus, Ohio, and mustered in as an Ohio National Guard unit of 834 men for 100 days service on May 11, 1864, under the command of Colonel Samuel H. Hunt.

Companies were assigned to duty as follows: Companies G and K in the defenses of Baltimore; Company B at Camp Parole, Annapolis, Maryland; Company E at Wilmington, Delaware; Company I at Fort Dix, Relay House. The remainder of the regiment was stationed at Fort McHenry. The regiment was attached to 1st Separate Brigade, VIII Corps, Middle Department. The regiment was relieved from duty at Baltimore and moved to Relay House. Attached to Kenley's Independent Brigade, VIII Corps.

The 144th Ohio Infantry mustered out of service at Camp Chase on August 31, 1864.

== Detailed service ==
Left Ohio for Baltimore, Md., May 11. Battle of Monocacy Junction, Md., July 9. Moved to Washington, D.C., July 13. Advance to Winchester and Snicker's Gap July 14–20. Operations in Shenandoah Valley July 20 to August 13. Repulse of attack by Mosby at Berryville August 13. Guard duty near Berryville until August 20.

== Casualties ==
The regiment lost a total of 63 men during service; 10 enlisted men killed or mortally wounded, 53 enlisted men died of disease.

== Commanders ==
- Colonel Samuel H. Hunt

== See also ==
- List of Ohio Civil War units
- Ohio in the Civil War
