= 149th Ohio Infantry Regiment =

- Active: May 8, 1864, to August 30, 1864
- Country: United States
- Allegiance: Union
- Branch: Union Army
- Type: Infantry
- Engagements: Battle of Monocacy (7 companies)

The 149th Ohio Infantry Regiment, sometimes 149th Ohio Volunteer Infantry (or 149th OVI) was an infantry regiment in the Union Army during the American Civil War.

== Service ==
The 149th Ohio Infantry was organized at Camp Dennison near Cincinnati, Ohio, and mustered in as an Ohio National Guard unit for 100 days service on May 8, 1864, under the command of Colonel Allison L. Brown.

The regiment was attached to Defenses of Baltimore, VIII Corps, Middle Department, to July 1864. 1st Separate Brigade, VIII Corps, to July 1864. Kenly's Independent Brigade, VIII Corps, to August 1864.

The 149th Ohio Infantry mustered out of service at Camp Dennison on August 30, 1864.

== Detailed service ==
Left Ohio for Baltimore, Md., May 11. Duty in the Defenses of Baltimore, and at different points on the eastern shore of Maryland until July 4. Moved to Monocacy Junction July 4. Battle of Monocacy Junction July 9. Moved to Washington, D.C., July 13. Advance to Snicker's Gap, Va., July 13–20. Operations in the Shenandoah Valley July 20-August 23. Action with Mosby at Berryville August 13.

== Casualties ==
The regiment lost a total of 42 men during service; 4 enlisted men killed or mortally wounded, 38 enlisted men died of disease.

== Commanders ==
- Colonel Allison L. Brown

== See also ==
- List of Ohio Civil War units
- Ohio in the Civil War
