= 140th Illinois Infantry Regiment =

140th Regiment Illinois Volunteer Infantry
- Illinois state flag
- Active: June 18, 1864, to October 29, 1864
- Country: United States
- Allegiance: Union
- Branch: Infantry

The 140th Regiment Illinois Volunteer Infantry was an infantry regiment that served in the Union Army during the American Civil War. It was among scores of regiments that were raised in the summer of 1864 as Hundred Days Men, an effort to augment existing manpower for an all-out push to end the war within 100 days.

== Service ==
The 140th Illinois Infantry was organized at Camp Butler, Illinois, and mustered into Federal service on June 18, 1864, for a one-hundred-day enlistment. The unit departed the same day for Cairo, by rail, and proceeded by rail to Memphis, Tennessee. From there it marched thirty miles east to the Wolfe River, where it was formed into divisions which were posted along the rail line to Holly Springs. After some three months it returned to Memphis where it did guard duty until ordered to Camp Fry, Chicago, where the regiment was mustered out of service on October 29, 1864.

After having given up their arms, the adjutant general of Illinois, Allen C. Fuller solicited them to re-organize and march through Missouri in pursuit of General Price, which took some six weeks, after which they returned to Camp Fry and were finally dismissed.

== Total strength and casualties ==
The regiment suffered 5 enlisted men killed in action or mortally wounded, and 24 enlisted men who died of disease, for a total of 29 fatalities.

== Commanders ==
- Colonel Lorenzo H. Whitney - mustered out with the regiment.

== See also ==
- List of Illinois Civil War Units
- Illinois in the American Civil War
