= 155th Ohio Infantry Regiment =

- Active: May – August 1864
- Country: United States of America
- Allegiance: Union
- Branch: Army
- Type: Infantry
- Role: garrison and guard duty
- Size: ~900
- Engagements: American Civil War; *Bermuda Hundred Campaign

The 155th Ohio Infantry Regiment, sometimes 155th Regiment, Ohio Volunteer Infantry (OVI) was a Union Army infantry regiment in the Union Army during the American Civil War. It was among scores of regiments raised as Hundred Days Men to provide relief for veteran troops to enable a major U.S. War Department push to end the war within 100 days.

== History ==
In early May 1864, the 92nd Regiment of the Ohio National Guard and the 44th Battalion (Mahoning County) were consolidated to form the 155th Regiment, Ohio Volunteer Infantry. The new unit was organized Sunday, May 8, at Camp Dennison (Cincinnati, Ohio) with 838 men under the command of Colonel Harley H. Sage for one hundred days' service. Sage had previously served in the 13th Ohio Infantry and 43rd Ohio Infantry, and had commanded the 92nd Regiment, Ohio National Guard before taking command of the 155th.

On May 12, the 155th OVI left for New Creek, West Virginia. The regiment did garrison duty at Martinsburg until June 3, when it moved to Washington, D.C. From there, it moved into Virginia to White House, Bermuda Hundred and then City Point. On June 29, it went into an entrenched camp at Norfolk, where it remained until July 27 as a part of the Army of the James. On that date, a Union expeditionary force (including the 155th Ohio, 20th New York Cavalry, 1st U.S. Volunteers, and two sections of the 8th New York Independent Battery) left Norfolk for Elizabeth City, North Carolina. The troops marched the forty miles or so south to Elizabeth City to capture horses, cotton, tobacco and other contraband. On August 4, the regiment returned to Norfolk. Fifteen days later, its term of enlistment expiring, the 155th was ordered home. The regiment returned to Ohio and was mustered out August 27, 1864. The 155th Ohio lost during its service 20 enlisted men by disease.

=== Service record ===
- May 8, 1864 - Mustered in at Camp Dennison
- May 12 - Departed Camp Dennison at 5:00 A.M.
- May 13 - At Parkersburg, West Virginia
- May 14 - At Cumberland, Maryland
- May 15 - Arrived at Martinsburg, West Virginia
- May 20 - Defenses of the Baltimore and Ohio Railroad
- May 25 - To Cedar Creek, Virginia, for escort duty
- May 26 - Back to Martinsburg, West Virginia
- June 3 - Ordered to Washington, D.C.
- June 9 - At White House, Virginia
- June 17 - Arrived at Bermuda Hundred, Virginia
- June 21 - At City Point, Virginia
- June 29 - Entrenched camp at Norfolk, Virginia
- July 27 - Expedition to Elizabeth City, North Carolina
- July 28 - Arrived at Elizabeth City, North Carolina
- August - Returned to Norfolk, Virginia
- August - Left for Ohio
- August 24 - Arrived at Camp Dennison, Ohio
- August 27 - Mustered out

=== Statistics ===
The men of the 155th varied greatly in age, with 52 men aged 40 and older. The oldest recruit was 48-year-old Private McAlister of Company A, and the youngest was 13-year-old William Barker, a musician with Company B. There was also 14-year-old Private Jimmy Ross of Company K.

Five companies of the 155th were from Pickaway County, Ohio—A, C, E, H, & I. Company H showed 83 men on the official roster; however two of the men never mustered, and another was discharged the day after muster on a Surgeon's Certificate of Disability. The remaining 80 active men of Company H ranged in age from a 15-year-old boy (the musician) to a 44-year-old sergeant. The average age of the company was 27, with 31 men aged 21 or younger, and six men aged 40 or over.

== Field & staff ==
- Harley H. Sage, Colonel
- Roswell Shurtleff, Lt. Colonel
- Peter Lutz, Major
- R. G. McLean, Surgeon
- R. S. Stansbury, Surgeon
- Thomas J. Watkins, Adjutant
- Joseph Wallace, Regimental Quartermaster
- Samuel M. Bright, Chaplain
- Charles N. Dodd, Sergeant Major
- Archibald Armstrong, Quartermaster Sergeant
- Joseph B. Dunlap, Commissary Sergeant
- William R. Elder, Hospital Steward
- Charles B. Dowe, Principal Musician

== Roll of Honor ==
- Clavin, Wilson T., Sergeant, Co. D - died July 13, 1864, at Norfolk, Virginia
- Howard, Cowden, Private, Co. G - died July 14, 1864, at Norfolk, Virginia
- Holiday, Lewis, Private, Co. E - died July 15, 1864, at Norfolk, Virginia
- Justice, G.A., Private, Co. F - died July 17, 1864
- McKinlay, William, Private, Co. E - died July 18, 1864, at Washington, D.C.
- Hunter, William, Private, Co. C - died July 19, 1864
- McCollum, Joel, Private, Co. D - died July 20, 1864, at Portsmouth, Virginia
- Warner, A.O., Private, Co. E - died July 21, 1864, at Portsmouth, Virginia
- Miller, James C., Private, Co. D - died July 31, 1864, at Portsmouth, Virginia
- Martz, Soloman, Private, Co. G - died August 1, 1864, at Portsmouth, Virginia
- Leopard, Manuel, Private, Co. D - died August 4, 1864, at Portsmouth, Virginia
- Baker, Lawrence, Private, Co. D - died August 5, 1864, at Portsmouth, Virginia
- Brothers, John W., 1st Sergt., Co. D - died August 13, 1864, at Portsmouth, Virginia
- Floor, Hiram, Private, Co. G - died August 14, 1864, at Portsmouth, Virginia
- McClain, John, Private, Co. H - died August 15, 1864, at Portsmouth, Virginia
- Shafer, David, Private, Co. G - died August 16, 1864, at Norfolk, Virginia
- Haggard, Thomas C., Private, Co. I - died August 21, 1864, at Portsmouth, Virginia
- Kennedy, Henderson G., Private, Co. D - died August 25, 1864, at Washington, D.C.
- Cunningham, Benj. C., Private, Co. B - died August 27, 1864
- Jacobs, Thomas, Private, Company B - died September 3, 1864, at Washington, D.C.
