= 133rd Illinois Infantry Regiment =

133rd Regiment Illinois Volunteer Infantry
- Illinois state flag
- Active: May 31, 1864, to September 24, 1864
- Country: United States
- Allegiance: Union
- Branch: Infantry

The 133rd Regiment Illinois Volunteer Infantry was an infantry regiment that served in the Union Army during the American Civil War. It was among scores of regiments that were raised in the summer of 1864 as Hundred Days Men, an effort to augment existing manpower for an all-out push to end the war within 100 days.

== Service ==
The 133rd Illinois Infantry was organized at Camp Butler, Illinois, and mustered into Federal service on May 31, 1864, for a one hundred day enlistment. The 133rd guarded prisoners at the Rock Island Arsenal.

The regiment was mustered out of service on September 24, 1864, at Camp Butler.

== Total strength and casualties ==
The regiment suffered 16 enlisted men who died of disease, for a total of 16 fatalities.

== Commanders ==
- Colonel Thaddeus Phillips – mustered out with the regiment.
- Second lieutenant, co. F, 133rd regt. Illinois vol. inf. Henry A. Sturges

== See also ==
- List of Illinois Civil War Units
- Illinois in the American Civil War
