= 47th Iowa Infantry Regiment =

- Iowa state flag
- Active: June 4, 1864, to September 28, 1864
- Country: United States
- Allegiance: Union
- Branch: Infantry

The 47th Iowa Infantry Regiment was an infantry regiment that served in the Union Army during the American Civil War. It was among scores of regiments that were raised in the summer of 1864 as Hundred Days Men, an effort to augment existing manpower for an all-out push to end the war within 100 days.

== Service ==
The 47th Iowa Infantry was organized at Davenport, Iowa, and mustered in for one-hundred days Federal service on June 4, 1864, as part of a plan to raise short term regiments for service as rear area garrison duty to release veteran troops for Sherman's Atlanta campaign. The 47th Iowa garrisoned strategic points in the District of Arkansas.

The regiment was mustered out at Davenport, Iowa, on September 28, 1864.

== Total strength and casualties ==
A total of 884 men served in the 47th Iowa at one time or another during its existence.

== See also ==
- List of Iowa Civil War Units
- Iowa in the American Civil War
