= Hundred Days Men =

Union military recruitment initiative during the American Civil War

The Hundred Days Men was the nickname applied to a series of regiments of United States Volunteers raised in 1864 for 100-day service in the Union Army during the height of the American Civil War. These short-term, lightly trained troops freed veteran units from routine duty to allow them to go to the front lines for combat purposes.

== Background ==
In the spring of 1864, the Governor of Ohio, John Brough, was concerned with preventing Confederate invasions of the North, as Brigadier General John Hunt Morgan's cavalry raid of Ohio had done during 1863. As the Civil War entered its fourth year, troops were increasingly difficult to raise both North and South. In the North, substantial bounties were offered to induce enlistment and the unpopular draft and substitute system was used to meet quotas.

Brough proposed to enlist the state militia into federal service for a period of 100 days to provide short-term troops that would serve as guards, laborers, and rear echelon soldiers to free more veteran units for combat duty. This would increase the number of men in the Northern armies campaigning in the South and allowing the Union to achieve victory more quickly—hopefully in one hundred or fewer days.

Brough expanded the idea and contacted the governors of Indiana, Illinois, Iowa, Wisconsin, and New Jersey to do likewise to raise 100,000 men to offer the Lincoln Administration. The governors of these five states submitted their suggestion to Secretary of War Edwin M. Stanton, who placed the proposal before President Abraham Lincoln. Lincoln immediately approved the plan.

== Formation and history ==
The War Department accepted all of Ohio's recruits, and the men were ready for duty within sixteen days of enlistment. Although other states brought in a total of around 25,000 men, only Ohio came close to its goal, federalizing close to 36,000 militiamen. Even when the system later spread to other Northern states, a total of only about 81,000 men was raised for a 100-day period.

These veterans became known as Hundred Days Men.

== 100-day Regiments by State ==
-Illinois

Illinois raised thirteen regiments and two battalions with 100-day enlistments. Five of these regiments voluntarily extended their term of service.

- 132nd Illinois Infantry
- 133rd Illinois Infantry
- 134th Illinois Infantry
- 135th Illinois Infantry
- 136th Illinois Infantry
- 137th Illinois Infantry
- 138th Illinois Infantry
- 139th Illinois Infantry
- 140th Illinois Infantry
- 141st Illinois Infantry
- 142nd Illinois Infantry
- 143rd Illinois Infantry
- 145th Illinois Infantry
- Alton Battalion

-Indiana

- 132nd Indiana Infantry
- 133rd Indiana Infantry
- 134th Indiana Infantry
- 135th Indiana Infantry
- 136th Indiana Infantry
- 137th Indiana Infantry
- 138th Indiana Infantry

-Iowa

- 44th Iowa Infantry
- 45th Iowa Infantry
- 46th Iowa Infantry
- 47th Iowa Infantry
- 48th Iowa Infantry Battalion

-Kansas

- 17th Kansas Infantry Regiment

-Ohio

- 130th Ohio Infantry
- 131st Ohio Infantry
- 132nd Ohio Infantry
- 133rd Ohio Infantry
- 134th Ohio Infantry
- 135th Ohio Infantry
- 136th Ohio Infantry
- 137th Ohio Infantry
- 138th Ohio Infantry
- 139th Ohio Infantry
- 140th Ohio Infantry
- 141st Ohio Infantry
- 142nd Ohio Infantry
- 143rd Ohio Infantry
- 144th Ohio Infantry
- 145th Ohio Infantry
- 146th Ohio Infantry
- 147th Ohio Infantry
- 148th Ohio Infantry
- 149th Ohio Infantry
- 150th Ohio Infantry
- 151st Ohio Infantry
- 152nd Ohio Infantry
- 153rd Ohio Infantry
- 154th Ohio Infantry
- 155th Ohio Infantry
- 156th Ohio Infantry
- 157th Ohio Infantry
- 159th Ohio Infantry
- 160th Ohio Infantry
- 161st Ohio Infantry
- 162nd Ohio Infantry
- 163rd Ohio Infantry
- 164th Ohio Infantry
- 165th Ohio Infantry
- 166th Ohio Infantry
- 167th Ohio Infantry
- 168th Ohio Infantry
- 169th Ohio Infantry
- 170th Ohio Infantry
- 171st Ohio Infantry
- 172nd Ohio Infantry

-New York

- 28th New York National Guard
- 54th New York National Guard
- 56th New York National Guard
- 58th New York National Guard
- 84th New York National Guard
- 93rd New York National Guard
- 98th New York National Guard
- 99th New York National Guard
- 102nd New York National Guard
- Batteries A and B, 1st Independent Battalion, Light Artillery, New York National Guard

-New Jersey

- 37th New Jersey Infantry

-Wisconsin

- 39th Wisconsin Infantry
- 40th Wisconsin Infantry
- 41st Wisconsin Infantry

== See also ==
- Illinois in the Civil War
- Iowa in the Civil War
- Ohio in the Civil War
- New Jersey in the Civil War
