= 48th Iowa Infantry Battalion =

48th Battalion Iowa Volunteer Infantry
- Iowa state flag
- Active: July 13, 1864, to October 21, 1864
- Country: United States
- Allegiance: Union
- Branch: Infantry

The 48th Battalion Iowa Volunteer Infantry was an infantry battalion that served in the Union Army during the American Civil War. It was among scores of regiments that were raised in the summer of 1864 as Hundred Days Men, an effort to augment existing manpower for an all-out push to end the war within 100 days.

== Service ==
The 48th Iowa Infantry was organized as Companies A, B, and C at Davenport, Iowa, and mustered in for one-hundred days federal service on July 13, 1864, as part of a plan to raise short term regiments for service as rear area garrison duty to release veteran troops for Sherman's Atlanta campaign. As there were not enough recruits to complete an entire regiment in the time allotted, the unit was redesignated a battalion. The battalion spent its entire service guarding prisoners of war at the Rock Island Barracks, Illinois.

The battalion was mustered out on October 21, 1864.

== Total strength and casualties ==
358 men served in the 48th Iowa Battalion at one time or another. Four enlisted men died of disease.

== Commanders ==
- Lieutenant Colonel Oliver H. P. Scott

== See also ==
- List of Iowa Civil War Units
- Iowa in the American Civil War

== Bibliography ==
- The Civil War Archive
