= 160 Transport Regiment RLC =

Regiment of the UK Territorial Army

160 Transport Regiment
- Active: 1967–1993; 1995–2014
- Country: United Kingdom
- Branch: British Army
- Role: Logistics
- Part of: Royal Corps of Transport (1967–1993); Royal Logistic Corps (1995–2014)
- Garrison/HQ: Grange Camp, Bedford (1967–1976); Prince William of Gloucester Barracks, Grantham (1976–2014)

160 Transport Regiment Royal Logistic Corps (Volunteers), was a regiment of the Territorial Army in the United Kingdom.

== Lineage ==
160 Transport Regiment can trace its lineage back to 1951, when the Army Emergency Reserve was formed. This comprised a reserve of individuals rather than units, with civilian skills that could be transferred to military use. Reservists were required to undertake two weeks of military training per year and could be called up under the same conditions as the Regular Reserve regiments. As part of the Army Emergency Reserve the Royal Army Service Corps established ten transport columns and additional sub-units with other logistic roles. By 1962 this had been reduced to two; 101 Tank Transport Column and 104 Transport Column, plus sub-units. In 1965, when the Royal Corps of Transport (RCT) was formed, these columns where redesignated regiments.

== First formation ==
In the 1967 Defence Review the Territorial Army and the Army Emergency Reserve were merged and renamed the Territorial & Army Volunteer Reserve (T&AVR). As a result, on 1 April 1967, 160 Transport Regiment, Royal Corps of Transport (Volunteers), was formed at Grange Camp, Bedford, the location of the RCT's Central Volunteer Headquarters (CVH), from personnel from 101 and 104 Transport Regiments RASC (AER). This new unit comprised 260 (Ambulance) Squadron, 261 (Bridging) Squadron, 262 (Petroleum Transport) Squadron and 263 (Tipper) Squadron. It initially provided engineering support as part of the Logistic Support Group (LSG) for the United Kingdom Mobile Force (UKMF) in NATO's Northern European Command.

In 1972 260 (Ambulance) Squadron was transferred to 161 Ambulance Regiment, RCT(V). In 1976 the regiment moved to new headquarters at Prince William of Gloucester Barracks, Grantham. On 1 April 1982, 160 Transport Regiment became part of 2 Transport Group, Royal Corps of Transport, an RCZ (Rear Combat Zone) formation of the British Army of the Rhine, exchanging roles with 155 (Wessex) Transport Regiment (Volunteers) which took over the engineer support role, and became a transport unit. It now comprised a Regimental HQ & Headquarters Squadron, 261 (General Transport) Squadron, 262 (Petroleum Transport) Squadron and 263 (General Transport) Squadron.

At this time 261 Squadron was operating the AEC Militant GS 10-ton truck which remained in service until around 1990. In 1990 a number of members of the regiment volunteered to serve with 15 Transport Squadron RCT, on a 6-month operational tour supporting the United Nations Peacekeeping Force in Cyprus.

The Options for Change Defence Review of 1990, drastically reduced the size of both the Regular and Territorial Army, with the Royal Corps of Transport being merged into the Royal Logistic Corps in April 1993, and at the same time 160 Transport Regiment was disbanded, with many of its personnel being absorbed by 161 Ambulance Regiment, RLC (V).

== Second formation ==
However, on 1 April 1995 160 Transport Regiment, Royal Logistic Corps was re-established to provide logistic support, particularly fuel resupply, to the Allied Rapid Reaction Corps (ARRC). The regiment now comprised the Regimental HQ & 260 (Headquarters) Squadron, 261 (General Transport DROPS) Squadron, 262 (Fuel) Squadron and 263 (General Transport DROPS) Squadron.

Following the 1998 Strategic Defence Review, 160 Transport Regiment was merged with 164 Transport Regiment, with squadrons from each being disbanded. The regiment now comprised the Regimental HQ, 261 (General Transport) Squadron and 263 (General Transport) Squadron (from 160), and 270 (General Transport) Squadron (from 164). In 2001 the regiment provided support to civil authorities during an outbreak of foot-and-mouth disease.

In January 2003 the Government decided to mobilise elements of the Territorial Army to support of military operations in Iraq (Operation Telic), and around 120 members of the regiment served there attached to other units. In April 2006 160 Transport Regiment was augmented by the addition of 126 (Petroleum) Squadron, transferred from 166 Supply Regiment RLC, which specialized in the construction and operation of bulk fuel installations. The regiment was twinned with 8 Transport Regiment RLC, during operations in Afghanistan (Operation Herrick), with personnel from the regiment providing replacements and backup, and also on detachment to other units.

As a result of the Army 2020 review, 160 Transport Regiment was disbanded at Grantham on 17 May 2014. However, personnel from the regiment then formed 160 (Lincoln) Transport Squadron, as part of 158 Regiment, Royal Logistic Corps, based at Sobraon Barracks, Lincoln.

== Commanding officers ==
Royal Corps of Transport

- Lieutenant Colonel E. Dennis Higgs (April 1967 – December 1969)
- Lieutenant Colonel Colin Brice (December 1969 – October 1971)
- Lieutenant Colonel J. David Suthers (November 1971 – October 1976)
- Lieutenant Colonel Derek S. Jackson (November 1976 – October 1979)
- Lieutenant Colonel David B. Coates (November 1979 – October 1982)
- Lieutenant Colonel John P. Lynch (November 1982 – October 1985)
- Lieutenant Colonel Anthony S. Feldman (November 1985 – October 1988)
- Lieutenant Colonel John Astbury (November 1988 – October 1991)
- Lieutenant Colonel Richard M. Wilkinson (November 1991 – April 1993)

Royal Logistics Corps

- Lieutenant Colonel Richard M. Wilkinson (April 1995 – March 1997)
- Lieutenant Colonel Alan A. D. Hamilton (April 1997 – September 2000)
- Lieutenant Colonel Michael J. Robinson (October 2000 – June 2003)
- Lieutenant Colonel Derrick Louis (August 2003 – July 2006)
- Lieutenant Colonel Martin F. White (August 2006 – July 2009)
- Lieutenant Colonel Michael C. A. Caseman-Jones (August 2009 – August 2012)
- Lieutenant Colonel Michael Hughes (September 2012 – March 2014)

== Honorary Colonels ==
- Major General Walter Henry Dennison (Dick) Ritchie (1967–1969)
- Major General Errol Henry Gerrard Lonsdale (1969–1974)
- Major General Peter Blunt (1974–1981)
- Colonel Rupert Lionel Wallis (1981–1993)
- Colonel Colin James Constable (1995–2003)
- Colonel John Astbury (2003–2014)
