= 46th Iowa Infantry Regiment =

- Iowa state flag
- Active: June 10, 1864, to September 23, 1864
- Country: United States
- Allegiance: Union
- Branch: Infantry

The 46th Iowa Infantry Regiment was an infantry regiment that served in the Union Army during the American Civil War. It was among scores of regiments that were raised in the summer of 1864 as Hundred Days Men, an effort to augment existing manpower for an all-out push to end the war within 100 days.

== Service ==
The 46th Iowa Infantry was organized at Davenport, Iowa, and mustered in for one-hundred days Federal service on June 10, 1864, as part of a plan to raise short term regiments for service as rear area garrison duty to release veteran troops for Sherman's Atlanta campaign. The 46th Iowa garrisoned strategic points on the Memphis & Charleston Railroad.

The regiment was mustered out at Davenport on September 23, 1864.

== Total strength and casualties ==
A total of 918 men served in the 46th Iowa at one time or another during its existence. It suffered 6 enlisted men who were killed in action or who died of their wounds and 25 enlisted men who died of disease, for a total of 31 fatalities.

== Commanders ==
- Colonel David B. Henderson, (future ten-term congressman and Speaker of the U.S. House of Representatives from 1899 to 1902)

== See also ==
- List of Iowa Civil War Units
- Iowa in the American Civil War
