= Battle of Monocacy order of battle: Confederate =

The following Confederate States Army units and commanders fought in Maryland's Frederick County Battle of Monocacy on July 9, 1864, during the American Civil War. The Union order of battle is shown separately.

== Abbreviations used ==
=== Military rank ===
- LTG = Lieutenant general
- MG = Major general
- BG = Brigadier general
- Col = Colonel
- Ltc = Lieutenant colonel
- Maj = Major
- Cpt = Captain
- Lt = Lieutenant

=== Other ===
- w = wounded
- mw = mortally wounded
- k = killed

== Army of the Valley ==
LTG Jubal A. Early

=== Breckinridge's Corps ===
MG John C. Breckinridge

Division	Brigade	Regiments and Others
Gordon's Division; MG John B. Gordon	Evans' Brigade BG Clement A. Evans (w); Col E. N. Atkinson	13th Georgia: Col J. H. Baker (w); 26th Georgia: Col Edmund N. Atkinson, Ltc James S. Blain; 31st Georgia: Col John H. Lowe; 38th Georgia: Maj Thomas H. Bomar; 60th Georgia: Cpt Milton Russell; 61st Georgia: Col John H. Lamar (k), Ltc J. D. VanValkenburg (k), Cpt Eliphalet F. Sharp; 12th Georgia Battalion: Maj George Hanvey (w); Cpt J. W. Anderson
Gordon's Division; MG John B. Gordon	Consolidated Louisiana Brigade BG Zebulon York	Hays' Louisiana Brigade: Col William R. Peck: 5th Louisiana: Maj Alexander Hart; 6th Louisiana: Ltc Joseph Hanlon; 7th Louisiana: Ltc Thomas M. Terry; 8th Louisiana: Cpt Louis Prados; 9th Louisiana: Ltc John J. Hodges (w); Stafford's Brigade: Col Eugene Waggaman: 1st Louisiana: Cpt Joseph Taylor; 2nd Louisiana: Ltc Michael A. Grogan; 10th Louisiana: Ltc Henry D. Monier; 14th Louisiana: Ltc David Zable; 15th Louisiana: Cpt H. J. Egan
Gordon's Division; MG John B. Gordon	Terry's Consolidated Virginia Brigade BG William Terry	Stonewall Brigade: Col John H. S. Funk: 2nd, 4th, 5th, 27th, and 33rd Virginia Consolidated Infantry Regiments; Second Brigade: Col Robert H. Dungan: 21st, 25th, 42nd, 44th, 48th, and 50th Virginia Consolidated Infantry Regiments; Third Brigade: Capt William B. Yancy: 10th, 23rd, 37th Virginia Consolidated Infantry Regiments
Breckinridge's Division; BG John Echols	Echols' Brigade Col George Smith Patton	22nd Virginia Infantry: Col George Smith Patton; 23rd Virginia Infantry Battalion: Ltc Clarence Derrick; 26th Virginia Infantry Battalion: Ltc George M. Edgar
Breckinridge's Division; BG John Echols	Wharton's Brigade BG Gabriel C. Wharton	45th Virginia Infantry: Maj Francis Miller; 51st Virginia Infantry: Col Augustus Forsberg; 30th Battalion, Virginia Sharpshooters: Maj Peter J. Otey
Breckinridge's Division; BG John Echols	Smith's Brigade Col Thomas Smith	36th Virginia Infantry; 60th Virginia Infantry: 45th Virginia Infantry Battalion: Maj Blake Lynch Woodson
Breckinridge's Division; BG John Echols	Vaughn's Brigade BG John C. Vaughn	1st Tennessee Cavalry Regiment: Colonel James E. Carter; 39th Tennessee Mounted Infantry Regiment: Major Robert McFarland; 43rd Tennessee Mounted Infantry Regiment: Captain Jasper N. Aiken; 59th Tennessee Mounted Infantry Regiment: Colonel William L. Eakin; 12th Tennessee Cavalry Battalion: Major George W. Day; 16th Tennessee Cavalry Battalion: Lieutenant Colonel John R.Neal; 16th Georgia Cavalry Battalion: Lieutenant Colonel Samuel J. Winn

=== Rodes' Corps ===
MG Robert E. Rodes

Division	Brigade	Regiments and Others
Rodes' Division; MG Robert E. Rodes	Grimes' Brigade BG Bryan Grimes (absent, wounded)	32nd North Carolina: Col Edmund C. Brabble; 43rd North Carolina: Col Thomas S. Kenan; 45th North Carolina: Col Samuel H. Boyd; 53rd North Carolina: Col William Owens; 2nd North Carolina Battalion
Rodes' Division; MG Robert E. Rodes	Cooks' Brigade BG Philip Cook	4th Georgia: Col Phillip Cook; 12th Georgia: Col Edward Willis; 21st Georgia: Col John T. Mercer; 44th Georgia: Col William H. Peebles
Rodes' Division; MG Robert E. Rodes	Cox's Brigade BG William Ruffin Cox	1st North Carolina: Col Hamilton M. Brown; 2nd North Carolina: Col J. P. Cobb; 3rd North Carolina: Col S. D. Thurston; 4th North Carolina: Col J. H. Wood; 14th North Carolina: Ltc W. A. Johnston; 30th North Carolina: Col F. M. Parker
Rodes' Division; MG Robert E. Rodes	Battle's Brigade Col Samuel B. Pickens	3rd Alabama: Col Charles Forsyth; 5th Alabama: Ltc E. L. Hobson; 6th Alabama: Col James N. Lightfoot; 12th Alabama: Col Samuel B. Pickens; 61st Alabama
Ramseur's Division; MG Stephen D. Ramseur	Lilley's Brigade BG Robert D. Lilley	13th Virginia Infantry: Maj Charles Thomas Crittenden; 31st Virginia Infantry: Col John Stringer Hoffman; 49th Virginia Infantry: Cpt William D. Moffett; 52nd Virginia Infantry: Col Augustus Forsberg; 58th Virginia Infantry: Col Francis Howard Board
Ramseur's Division; MG Stephen D. Ramseur	Johnston's Brigade BG Robert D. Johnston	5th North Carolina: Col John W. Lea; 12th North Carolina: Ltc W. S. Davis; 20th North Carolina: Col Thomas F. Toon; 23rd North Carolina: Col Charles C. Blacknall
Ramseur's Division; MG Stephen D. Ramseur	Lewis' Brigade BG William G. Lewis	6th North Carolina: Ltc S. M. Tate; 21st North Carolina: Maj William J. Pfohl; 54th North Carolina: Ltc Anderson Ellis; 57th North Carolina: Col Archibald C. Godwin

=== Artillery Reserve ===
Chief of Artillery: BG Armistead L. Long

Division	Battalion	Battery and Others
Artillery Division; Ltc J. Floyd King	Nelson's Battalion Ltc William Nelson	Milledge's (Georgia) Battery: Cpt John Milledge; Amherst (Virginia) Artillery: Cpt Thomas J. Kirkpatrick; Fluvanna (Virginia) Artillery: Cpt John L. Massie
Artillery Division; Ltc J. Floyd King	Braxton's Battalion Ltc Carter Braxton	Allegheny (Virginia) Artillery: Cpt John C. Carpenter; Stafford (Virginia) Artillery: Cpt Raleigh L. Cooper; Lee (Virginia) Artillery: Cpt W. W. Hardwicke
Artillery Division; Ltc J. Floyd King	McLaughlin's Battalion Maj William McLaughlin	Lewisburg (Virginia) Artillery: Cpt Thomas A. Bryan; Wise Legion Artillery: Cpt W. M. Lowry; Monroe (Virginia) Artillery: Cpt George B. Chapman

=== Cavalry ===
MG Robert Ransom

Brigade	Regiment and Other
McCausland's Brigade BG John McCausland	14th Virginia Cavalry: Col James Cochran; 16th Virginia Cavalry: Col Milton J. Ferguson; 17th Virginia Cavalry: Ltc William C. Tavenner (mw); 22nd Virginia Cavalry: Col Henry Bowen
Johnson's Brigade BG Bradley Tyler Johnson	2nd Maryland Cavalry: Col Harry W. Gilmor; 8th Virginia Cavalry: Col James M. Corns; 21st Virginia Cavalry: Col William E. Peters; 25th Virginia Cavalry: Col Warren M. Hopkins; 34th Virginia Cavalry Battalion: Ltc Vincent A. Witcher; 36th Virginia Cavalry Battalion: Maj James W. Sweeney; 37th Virginia Cavalry Battalion: Ltc Ambrose C. Dunn
Imboden's Brigade BG John D. Imboden; Col George Smith	18th Virginia Cavalry: Col George W. Imboden; 23rd Virginia Cavalry: Col Robert White; 62nd Virginia Mounted Infantry: Col George H. Smith; Unauthorized Virginia Cavalry Battalion
