= 45th Iowa Infantry Regiment =

- Iowa state flag
- Active: May 25, 1864, to September 15, 1864
- Country: United States
- Allegiance: Union
- Branch: Infantry

The 45th Iowa Infantry Regiment was an infantry regiment that served in the Union Army during the American Civil War. It was among scores of regiments that were raised in the summer of 1864 as Hundred Days Men, an effort to augment existing manpower for an all-out push to end the war within 100 days.

== Service ==
The 45th Iowa Infantry was organized at Keokuk, Iowa, and mustered in for one hundred days of Federal service on May 25, 1864, as part of a plan to raise short-term regiments for service as rear area garrison duty to release veteran troops for Sherman's Atlanta campaign. The 45th Iowa garrisoned strategic points on the Memphis & Charleston Railroad.

The regiment was mustered out at Keokuk on September 15, 1864.

== Total strength and casualties ==
A total of 972 men served in the 45th Iowa at one time or another during its existence. It suffered 3 enlisted men who were killed in action or who died of their wounds and 19 enlisted men who died of disease, for a total of 22 fatalities.

== Commanders ==
- Colonel Alvah H. Bereman

== See also ==
- List of Iowa Civil War Units
- Iowa in the American Civil War
