= David Ramsay Clendenin =

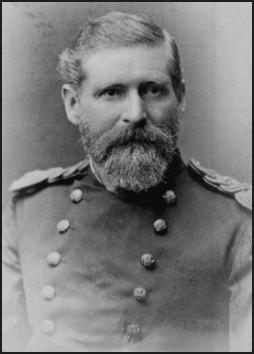

David Ramsay Clendenin (June 24, 1830 – March 5, 1895) was an American teacher and career officer. He served as a career officer in the United States Army from 1861 to 1891.

David Ramsay Clendenin was born in Little Britain, Pennsylvania on June 24, 1830. He moved to Illinois in 1850 and graduated from Knox College in 1854. He was a teacher until the outbreak of the American Civil War, when in early 1861 he joined the District of Columbia Militia as a private. On September 18, 1861, he was appointed a captain of the 8th Illinois Cavalry and promoted to major the same day. He was appointed lieutenant colonel of the regiment on December 5, 1862, and brevet colonel on February 20, 1865.

Clendenin was one of 9 members of the military commission that tried and convicted the Lincoln conspirators from May 8, 1865, to July 15, 1865. He was mustered out of the volunteers on July 17, 1865.

On January 13, 1866, President Andrew Johnson nominated Clendenin for appointment to the grade of brevet brigadier general of volunteers, to rank from July 11, 1865, and the United States Senate confirmed the appointment on March 12, 1866.

Clendenin was appointed major of the 8th Cavalry Regiment on January 22, 1867, lieutenant colonel of the 3rd Cavalry Regiment on November 1, 1882, and colonel of the 2nd Cavalry Regiment on October 20, 1888. He retired from the United States Army on April 20, 1891.

David Ramsay Clendenin died March 5, 1895, at Oneida, Illinois. He is buried in Oneida Cemetery.

== See also ==
- List of American Civil War brevet generals (Union)
