= Battle of Monocacy =

Battle of the American Civil War

Coordinates: 39.3711°N 77.3920°W

- Part of the American Civil War
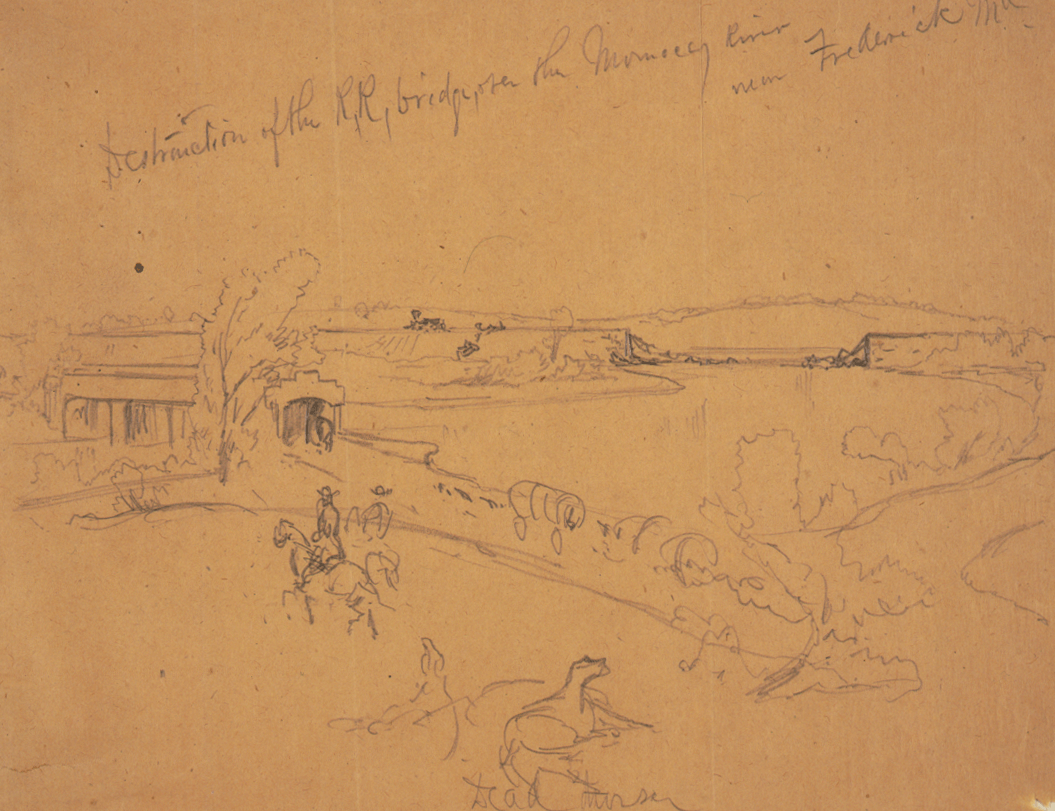
- Destruction of the R.R. bridge, over the Monocacy River near Frederick, Md. Alfred R. Waud, artist
Date	July 9, 1864
Location	Frederick County, Maryland
Result	Confederate victory

Belligerents
United States (Union)	Confederate States

Commanders and leaders
Lew Wallace	Jubal A. Early

Strength
5,800	14,000

Casualties and losses
1,294	700–900

The Battle of Monocacy (also known as Monocacy Junction) was fought on July 9, 1864, about 6 miles (9.7 km) from Frederick, Maryland, as part of the Valley Campaigns of 1864 during the American Civil War. Confederate forces under Lt. Gen. Jubal A. Early defeated Union forces under Maj. Gen. Lew Wallace. The battle was part of Early's raid through the Shenandoah Valley and into Maryland in an attempt to divert Union forces from their siege of Gen. Robert E. Lee's army at Petersburg, Virginia.

The battle was the northernmost Confederate victory of the war. Afterward, the Union troops retreated to Baltimore, Maryland, and the Confederates continued toward Washington. But because the battle had delayed Early's march for a day, Union reinforcements had time to get to the Union capital before the Confederates. Early launched an attack on Washington on July 12 at the Battle of Fort Stevens, but the Confederates were unsuccessful and retreated to Virginia.

== Background ==
In May and June, as part of the Valley Campaigns of 1864, Union General-in-Chief Lt. Gen. Ulysses S. Grant planned a coordinated movement of troops against Confederates in Virginia. It was during this campaign that Lt. Gen. Jubal Early's Confederates defeated Union forces to open a path to Washington, D.C. After skirmishing with Maj. Gen. David Hunter's men outside Lynchburg, Virginia, on June 17 and 18, Early increased his forces to nearly 16,000 men and continued to Martinsburg, West Virginia. The outnumbered Union troops had evacuated the town. On June 19, a small Union force at Harpers Ferry, West Virginia, burned the bridge across the Potomac River.

Grant reacted to Early's raids at Martinsburg and Harpers Ferry by dispatching two brigades, about 5,000 men, from the 3rd Division of the VI Corps, under Brig. Gen. James B. Ricketts, from City Point, Virginia, to Harpers Ferry on July 5, 1864. Until Union troops arrived to defend Washington, the only Federal force between Early and the Union capital was a 2,300-man force (mostly Hundred Days Men) under the command of Maj. Gen. Lew Wallace. At the time, Wallace, who would become better known as the author of Ben-Hur, was in command of the Union's Middle Department and VIII Corps, based in Baltimore. Few of Wallace's men had battle experience. Although Wallace had experience as a battlefield commander, having been the Union Army's youngest major general at the time of his promotion, his military career faltered after he was blamed for the high casualties taken on the first day at the Battle of Shiloh.

In the meantime, agents of the Baltimore and Ohio Railroad at Cumberland, Maryland, and Harpers Ferry reported signs of Early's advance on June 29. John W. Garrett, the president of the railroad and a Union supporter, passed this intelligence, and subsequent reports reached Wallace on July 3. Garrett was concerned about protecting a railroad bridge at Monocacy Junction, Maryland, where it crossed the Monocacy River. The bridge was important to rail connections at Harpers Ferry and points farther west, so Wallace agreed to bring a force to the Monocacy to protect it.

== Preparing for battle ==
On July 3, acting on his own without orders from his superiors or informing them of his intentions, Wallace dispatched Brig. Gen. Erastus B. Tyler and men from the 1st Maryland Infantry and 3rd Maryland Infantry, Potomac Home Brigade, to Monocacy Junction to establish defensive positions. After Garrett's agents reported the Confederate attack at Harpers Ferry, Wallace relayed the information to Gen. Henry Halleck, then ordered his brigades at Baltimore to be ready to move. Wallace departed for Monocacy Junction on July 4 to assess its defenses.

Uncertain whether Baltimore or Washington was the Confederate objective, Wallace knew he had to delay their approach until reinforcements could reach either city. Wallace saw Monocacy Junction, also called Frederick Junction, 3 miles (4.8 km) southeast of Frederick, as the most logical point to defend Baltimore and Washington. A plain extended north and west from the river at Monocacy Junction to the Catoctin Mountains, 6 miles (9.7 km) away. From Monocacy Junction, the B&O Railroad's bridge crossed the river at the foot of a bluff. A wooden bridge provided the Georgetown Pike access to Washington across the Monocacy River, a short distance downriver, while a stone bridge took Baltimore Pike across the Monocacy 2 miles (3.2 km) upriver. Two blockhouses, one near the junction and another on the bluff above the railroad bridge, provided additional protection. A 24-pound howitzer was installed at the blockhouse on the bluff. If Wallace could stretch his force across 6 miles (9.7 km) of the stream to protect both turnpike bridges, the railroad bridge, and several river fords, he could force Early to disclose the strength and objective of the Confederate force and delay him as long as possible.

Initially, Wallace's forces along the river at Monocacy Junction consisted of Tyler's brigades and a cavalry force of 230 troopers from the 8th Illinois Cavalry Regiment commanded by Lt. Col. David R. Clendenin. Wallace moved in additional troops to assist them, including the 11th Maryland, a field artillery unit, and Ohio units from Annapolis and Baltimore. Wallace's men skirmished with Early's cavalry west of Frederick on July 7, but later retreated toward Monocacy Junction to avoid being surrounded. Following the skirmishing on July 7 and 8, when Confederate cavalry drove Union units from Frederick, Early demanded, and received, $200,000 ransom from the city to save it from destruction.

Wallace's prospects improved when word arrived that the first contingent of VI Corps troops, commanded by Ricketts, had reached Baltimore. Although they were originally ordered to travel by rail to Harpers Ferry, Ricketts and about 3,300 of his men arrived at Monocacy Junction, where Wallace stopped them on the evening of July 8. Ricketts agreed to remain at the Monocacy to assist Wallace. When Wallace informed Halleck that the Confederates were threatening the road to Washington, Halleck wired Grant to send reinforcements to the capital. The Union troops at Monocacy Junction would have to delay Early's troops, who were within a two-days' march of Washington.

On Saturday, July 9, the combined forces of Wallace and Ricketts, about 6,800 men, were positioned at the bridges and fords of the river. The higher elevation of the river's east bank formed a natural breastwork for some of the men, while Tyler's brigade occupied the two block-houses and trenches his soldiers had dug near the bridges. Ricketts's division occupied the Thomas and Worthington farms on the Union left, using the fences as breastworks. Confederate troop estimates ranged from 14,000 to 28,000 men, nearly double the size of the Union forces.

== Battle ==
Battle of Monocacy Confederate Union

Wallace’s objectives for the battle were simple: keep the road to Washington secure as long as possible and maintain a line of retreat for his men. On July 9, between 9 and 10 a.m., Confederate Maj. Gen. Stephen Dodson Ramseur's division encountered about 3,500 of Rickett's men along the bluffs overlooking the bridge where the Georgetown Pike crossed the river, while Maj. Gen. Robert E. Rodes's division clashed with Tyler's brigade, who were guarding the Baltimore Pike and its stone bridge across the river. Clendenin's Union cavalry was downstream, watching the river. Prisoners taken during this phase told the Confederates that the entire VI Corps was present, which seemed to have heightened the Confederates' caution and they did not initially press their numerical advantage.

Believing that a frontal attack across the Monocacy would be too costly, Early sent Brig. Gen. John McCausland's cavalry of about 1,100 men down Buckeystown Road to find a ford and outflank the Union line. McCausland crossed the Monocacy below the McKinney-Worthington ford, about a mile downstream from the Georgetown Pike bridge, and attacked Wallace's left flank. Due to the rolling terrain, McCausland's men did not notice that four regiments of Ricketts's veteran troops had taken a position along a fence separating the Worthington and Thomas farms. Consequently, the Union line was able to fire a single volley that destroyed McCausland's front line and panicked the remaining Confederates. McCausland rallied his brigade and launched another attack, but was unable to break the Union line and retreated.

When the cavalry could not break the Union flank on its own, Early sent Maj. Gen. John B. Gordon's infantry division across the ford to assist in the attack. Gordon launched a three-pronged attack with three brigades against Ricketts's center and both flanks. Ricketts's right flank was pushed back, allowing the Confederates to enfilade the Union line. Pressure from Ramseur's attack on the Union center and Confederate artillery fire from across the river kept Wallace from reinforcing Ricketts's men. Unable to hold the Union line, Wallace ordered a retreat toward Baltimore, leaving Tyler's brigade holding the stone bridge with a small force of men. Clendenin's cavalry remained 5 miles (8.0 km) south on the Georgetown Pike as a rearguard. Rodes's Confederate troops made one final push to capture the stone bridge about 6 p.m., but most of the Union troops were already headed toward Baltimore. At the end of the day, the outnumbered Union forces had withstood five attacks before they were forced to retreat.

== Aftermath ==
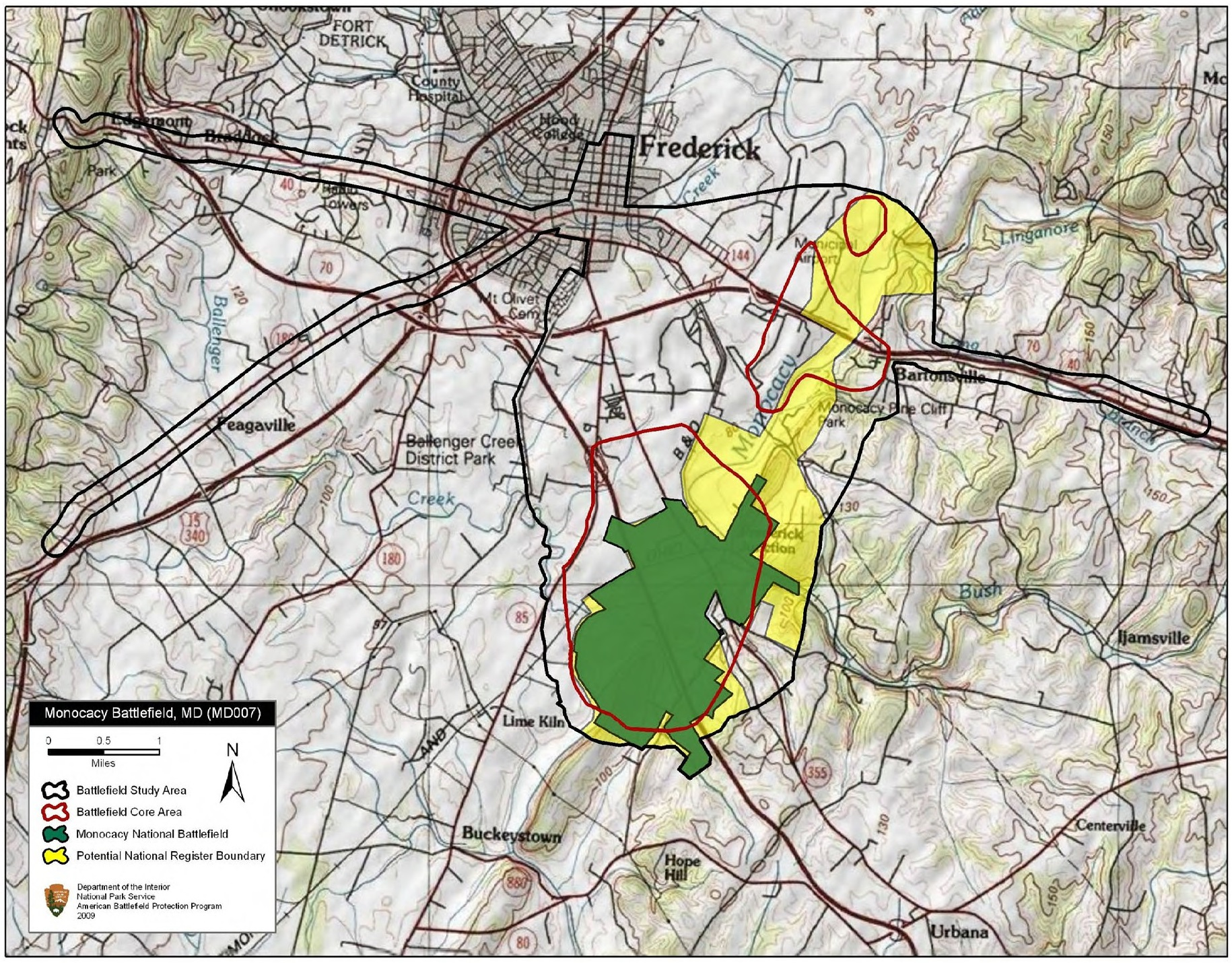
Map of Monocacy Battlefield core and study areas by the American Battlefield Protection Program

By late afternoon on July 9, following this northernmost Confederate victory of the war, the Federals were retreating toward Baltimore, leaving behind more than 1,294 dead, wounded, or captured. Early's army had won the field at Monocacy, but at the cost of an estimated 700 to 1,000 men killed or wounded and the loss of a day's march.

Wallace telegrammed Halleck that his forces fought until 5 p.m., but the Confederate forces, which he estimated at 20,000 men, had overwhelmed them and forced a retreat. One critical objective had been accomplished: the Union troops at Monocacy Junction had delayed Early’s advance on Washington by a full day.

After hearing of the retreat, Grant, exercising his powers as general-in-chief, put Maj. Gen. E. O. C. Ord in command of Wallace’s troops. (Wallace did not learn that he had been replaced until July 11, after his forces reached Baltimore; however, he still retained responsibility for the administration of the Middle Department.) When government officials became aware of the efforts that Wallace and his men had made to save Washington, the situation changed. Wallace was restored to full command of VIII Corps and the Middle Department on July 28.

With Wallace's retreat to Baltimore, the road lay open to Washington. On July 10 the Confederates began the march toward the Union capital. By midday on Monday, July 11, Early arrived at Fort Stevens, from where he could see the dome of the U.S. Capitol through his glasses. With his troops straggling behind him, exhausted from the heat and the long march, Early decided to delay the attack on the fort until July 12. Although artillery exchanges and skirmishes occurred on July 11, prior to the full-scale attack, Early was too late. VI Corps, the Union troops that Grant had dispatched to Washington, had already arrived and was prepared to defend the city. The Confederate infantry, reduced to 8,000 men, was unable to continue. By July 14 Early had crossed the Potomac at White's Ferry into Virginia.

We marched in the line of battle into a peach orchard in front of Fort Stevens, and here the fight began. For a short time it was warm work, but as the President and many ladies were looking at us, every man tried to do his best. Without our help the small force in the forts would have been overpowered. Jubal Early should have attacked earlier in the morning, but Early was late. — Elisha Hunt Rhodes, 2nd Rhode Island Volunteers, July 12, 1864.

The battle at Monocacy cost Early a day's march and his chance to capture Washington. Thwarted in the attempt to take the Union capital, the Confederates retreated into Virginia, ending their last campaign to carry the war into the North. Union forces in the area pursued Early, but due to a divided military command, they were unable to defeat him. In response, Grant formed the Middle Military Division, covering Maryland, West Virginia, Pennsylvania, the District of Columbia, and the Shenandoah Valley, to coordinate the offense against Confederate forces in the valley.

General Early wrote in a report of the 1864 campaign:

Some of the Northern papers stated that, between Saturday and Monday, I could have entered the city; but on Saturday I was fighting at Monocacy, thirty-five miles from Washington, a force which I could not leave in my rear; and after disposing of that force and moving as rapidly as it was possible for me to move, I did not arrive in front of the fortifications until after noon on Monday, and then my troops were exhausted ...

Grant assessed Wallace's delaying tactics at Monocacy in his memoirs:

If Early had been but one day earlier, he might have entered the capital before the arrival of the reinforcements I had sent .... General Wallace contributed on this occasion by the defeat of the troops under him, a greater benefit to the cause than often falls to the lot of a commander of an equal force to render by means of a victory.

In late July, Wallace gave orders to collect the bodies of the dead and bury them on the battlefield. He also proposed a monument to be erected on the site with an inscription that would read: "These men died to save the National Capital, and they did save it." (Wallace's proposed monument was never built, but five others were erected in honor of those who died in the battle.)

== Battlefield preservation ==
The battlefield remained in private hands for more than one hundred years before portions of it were acquired in the late 1970s to create the Monocacy National Battlefield. The park was dedicated in July 1991. Five monuments were erected at the site, including tributes to Union troops from New Jersey, Vermont, and Pennsylvania, as well as to the Confederate force who fought in the battle. The American Battlefield Trust and its partners have acquired and preserved 445 acres of the Monocacy battlefield as of mid-2023.

== In popular culture ==
The American independent film, No Retreat from Destiny: The Battle That Rescued Washington, is a 2006 docudrama about the Battle of Monocacy.

The battle is featured in the novel Valley of the Shadow (2015) by Ralph Peters.
