= Cambrian (disambiguation) =

The Cambrian Period was the first geological period of the Paleozoic Era, 539–485 million years ago.

Cambrian may also refer to the following:

- Cambria, the Latin name for Cymru (Wales)
  - anything Welsh, for which Cambrian is a synonym
- Cambrian explosion

== Places ==
- Cambrian Heights, Calgary, Alberta, Canada
- Cambrian Mountains, a mountain range in Wales
- Cambrians, a former gold-mining settlement in Otago, New Zealand
- Cambrian Park, San Jose, California, United States

== Newspapers ==
- Cambrian News, a Welsh newspaper
- The Cambrian, a former Welsh newspaper founded in 1806
- The Cambrian (U.S.), a Welsh-language newspaper printed in the United States, 1880–1919
- The Cambrian, a newspaper serving Cambria, California, owned by The Tribune of San Luis Obispo

== Transportation ==
- Cambrian Railways, a defunct railway company in Wales
  - Cambrian Heritage Railways, a heritage railway in Oswestry, Shropshire, England
  - Cambrian Line, a railway in Wales, United Kingdom
  - Cambrian Coast Express, a named passenger train on the Cambrian Line
- Cambrian Airways, a Welsh airline begun in 1935, later absorbed by British Airways

== Other uses ==
- Cambrian United F.C., a football club in Wales
- Cambrian College, in Greater Sudbury, Ontario, Canada
- Cambrian Genomics, a defunct biotechnology company
- Cambrian Pottery, a Welsh pottery 1764–1870
- Cambrian School and College, in Bangladesh
- Cambrian School District, in San Jose, California, U.S.
- HMS Cambrian, the name of several Royal Navy ships

== See also ==
- Cambria (disambiguation)
- Cumbrian (disambiguation)
- Cymric (disambiguation), etymologically related to both Cambrian and Cumbrian
- Wales
- Cambrian Colliery, a former coalmine in Wales
- Cambrian Way, a long-distance footpath in Wales
- Exercise Cambrian Patrol, an annual patrolling competition in Wales
