= Cambria (disambiguation) =

Cambria is a Latin name for Wales.

Cambria may also refer to:

== People ==
- Fred Cambria (born 1948), American baseball player
- Joe Cambria (1890–1962), American baseball scout
- Paul Cambria, American attorney

== Places ==
=== Canada ===
- Cambria, Alberta
- Rural Municipality of Cambria No. 6, Saskatchewan, a rural municipality

=== South Africa ===
- Cambria, South Africa; see List of populated places in South Africa

=== United States ===
- Cambria, California
- Cambria, Illinois
- Cambria, Indiana
- Cambria, Iowa
- Cambria, Michigan
- Cambria, Minnesota
- Cambria, New York
- Cambria Heights, Queens, a neighborhood of New York City
- Cambria, Pennsylvania
- Cambria, West Virginia
- Cambria, Wisconsin
- Cambria, Wyoming
- Cambria County, Pennsylvania
- Cambria Township (disambiguation)

== Ships ==
- Cambria (yacht), a racing yacht
- MV Cambria, a ship that served the Dublin to Holyhead route from 1949 until the 1970s
- SB Cambria, a restored spritsail barge
- SS Cambria, various steamships
- USS Cambria (APA-36), a World War II-era transport of the US Navy

== Businesses ==
- Cambria (company), an American producer of quartz surfaces
- Cambria Hotels, a brand under Choice Hotels International
- Cambria Press, an American academic publisher

== Other uses ==
- Cambria (journal), a former Welsh academic journal on geographical and related topics
- Cambria (typeface), a transitional serif typeface
- Cambria Killgannon, a character in The Amory Wars comic book series
- × Cambria, a commercial orchid name for the hybrid genus × Aliceara

== See also ==
- Cambrian (disambiguation)
- Cumbrian (disambiguation)
- Cambia (disambiguation), an unrelated word
- Coheed and Cambria, an American progressive-metal band
- Cumbia, a style of music and dance (unrelated word)
- Cumbria (disambiguation), etymologically related
- Cymric (disambiguation), etymologically related
