= Benjamin Franklin Davis =

19th-century Union Army officer during the American Civil War

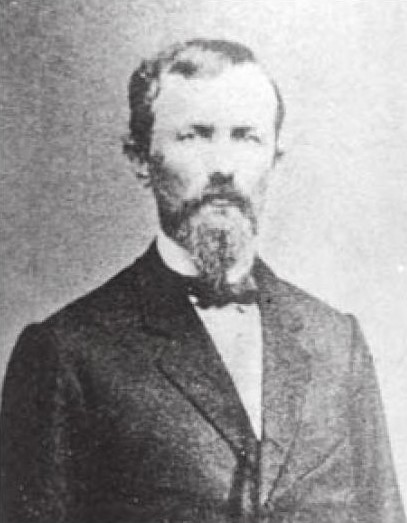
- Born: October, 1831; Alabama
- Died: June 9, 1863 (aged 31) near Brandy Station, Virginia
- Burial place: West Point Cemetery
- Military career
- Allegiance: United States
- Branch: US Army
- Service years: 1854–1863
- Rank: Colonel
- Nickname: "Grimes"
- Unit: 1st U.S. Cavalry Regiment
- Commands: 8th New York Cavalry Regiment; 1st Brigade, 1st Div., Cavalry Corps
- Conflicts: American Civil War: Peninsula Campaign; Northern Virginia Campaign; Chancellorsville Campaign; Battle of Harpers Ferry; Battle of Brandy Station †

Benjamin Franklin "Grimes" Davis (October, 1831 – June 9, 1863) was an American military officer who served in Indian wars, and then led Union cavalry in the American Civil War before dying in combat. He led a daring escape from the Confederate-encircled Union garrison at Harpers Ferry.

== Biography ==
Born in Alabama, Davis was the eldest of six sons born to Benjamin E. and Matilda Holladay Davis between 1831 and 1843. Matilda Davis died in 1843. Benjamin E. Davis died in June 1846 (See An Ornament To His Country: The Life and Military Career of Benjamin Franklin Davis, published December 2023). Benjamin Davis and his five younger brothers became wards of an uncle, William Taylor, who lived in Monroe County, Mississippi. Davis was appointed from Mississippi to the United States Military Academy at West Point, New York, graduating in 1854. Among his classmates were Jeb Stuart, Stephen H. Weed, Oliver Otis Howard and William Dorsey Pender. Davis was originally assigned to the 5th U. S. Infantry but transferred to the 1st. U. S. Dragoons March 3, 1855. Wounded while fighting the Apache in frontier New Mexico, Davis served with the dragoons in New Mexico and California. He was a captain with the 1st Dragoons when he was appointed lieutenant colonel of the 1st California Volunteer Cavalry Battalion on August 19, 1861. He commanded this battalion until he resigned on November 1, 1861, to return east with the 1st U.S. Cavalry. At the outbreak of war, Davis decided to stay with the Union, and was promoted to captain, 1st U.S. Cavalry Regiment, July 30, 1861. Davis had three brothers who served in the Confederate States Army, two with the 11th Mississippi Infantry and a third in the 2nd Mississippi. Neither brother who served with the 11th Mississippi survived the war. The brother who served with the 2nd Mississippi survived the war but took his own life several years after hostilities ceased.

Commissioned colonel of the 8th New York Cavalry Regiment on June 25, 1862, Davis was leading that unit on September 14, stationed with the defending force at Harpers Ferry, after the town had been invested by troops under Stonewall Jackson. Finding his commanding officer Col. Dixon S. Miles unable to protect the force from bombardment and ready to surrender his troops, Davis and fellow officer Lt. Col. Hasbrouck Davis with his 12th Illinois Cavalry determined to fight their way out northward out of the encirclement.

Crossing the Potomac River on a pontoon bridge under cover of night, 1,300 Union cavalrymen quietly escaped, overwhelming or avoiding Confederate pickets assigned to cover the winding road north. While moving in pitch black darkness, Davis came across an artillery wagon train belonging to Confederate Major General James Longstreet, and using his deep Mississippi-accented voice, ordered their unsuspecting commander to change direction and accept his unit as cavalry escort. As sunlight broke, the wagon drivers were startled to discover drawn pistols from their blue-clad escort, and as a result Davis's command not only escaped to Union lines at Greencastle, Pennsylvania, by morning September 15, but also captured Longstreet's forty-wagon reserve ordnance train with no losses. Davis was promoted to major in the Regular Army for his exploit.

"When Colonel Davis found the rebels he did not stop at anything, but went for them heavy. I believe he liked to fight the rebels as well as he liked to eat."

— Trooper of the 8th New York Cavalry

Davis led the 1st Brigade of Brig. Gen. Alfred Pleasonton's cavalry division through the ineffectual "Stoneman Raid" in the Chancellorsville Campaign. In the Gettysburg campaign, Davis led the brigade in the Battle of Brandy Station. In the early hours of June 9, 1863, Davis's men charged a South Carolina artillery battery near Beverly's Ford and were met by a strong cavalry counterattack, which sent most of the brigade reeling. Davis himself refused to fall back and challenged all comers to combat. He twirled his saber with one hand, firing his Colt revolver with the other until he ran out of ammunition. Confederate Lt. O. R. Allen of Major Caball E. Flournoy's 6th Virginia Cavalry Regiment charged at Davis, hugging his horse's neck to evade Davis's saber slashing, then fired his pistol three times at point-blank range. The third shot struck Davis in the forehead, killing him instantly.

Davis was a man of rough manners and a stern disciplinarian. One of his troopers described him as "a proud tyrannical devil" as likely to be killed by his own soldiers as by the Confederates. The Provost Marshal General of the Army of the Potomac, Marsena R. Patrick, described him as "our best cavalry officer". He was buried in the West Point cemetery.
