= Pisa Range =

Mountains in the southern South Island of New Zealand

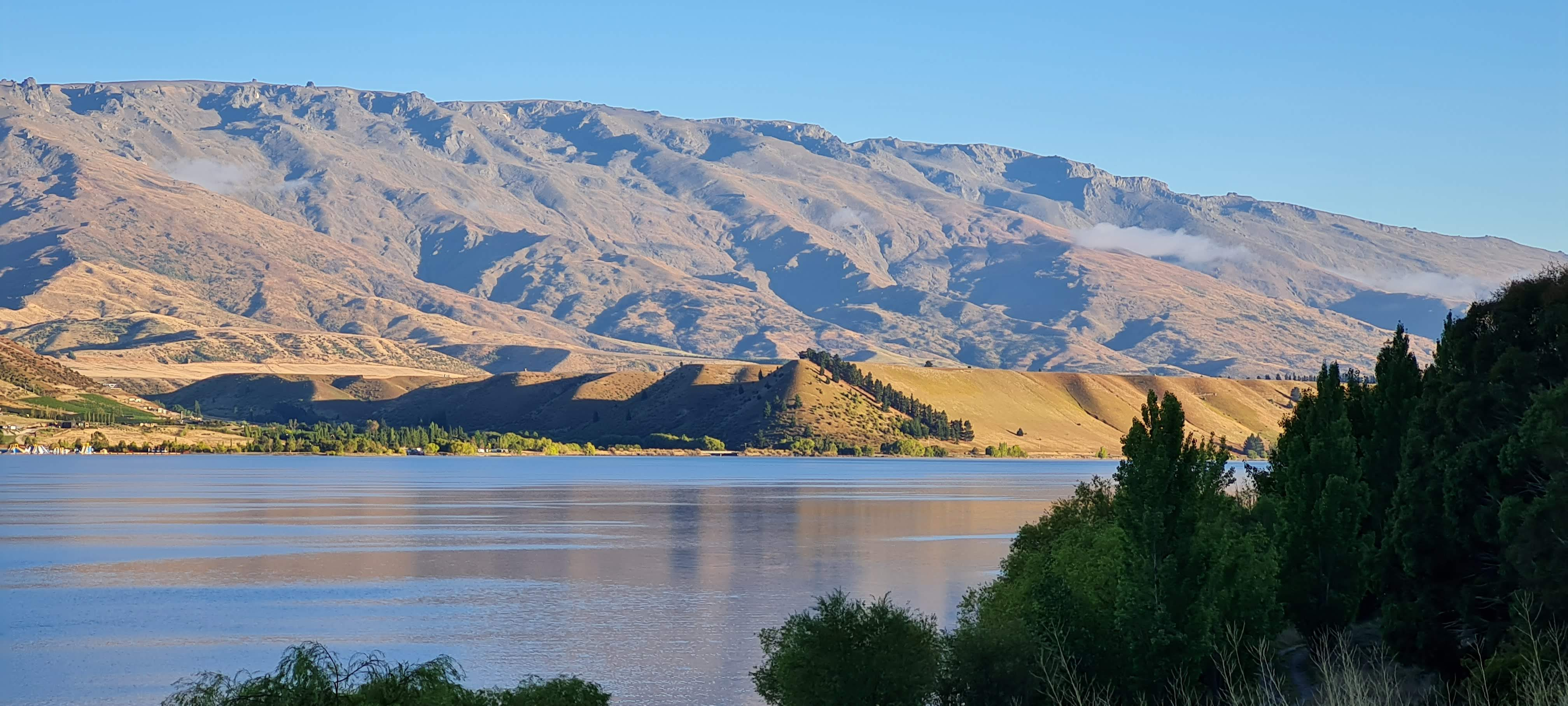

Highest point
- Peak: Mount Pisa
- Elevation: 1,963 m (6,440 ft)
- Coordinates: 44°52′21″S 169°11′27″E

Dimensions
- Length: 38 km (24 mi) 29°
- Width: 16 km (9.9 mi) 119°
- Area: 605 km^{2} (234 mi^{2})

Naming
- Native name: Taraputa (Māori)
- English translation: (Mount Pisa) Tara Putakitaki was an early Kāti Mamoe chief

Geography
- Location within New Zealand
- Location: Otago, South Island, New Zealand
- Country: New Zealand
- Region: Otago
- Range coordinates: 44.870°S 169.201°E
- Parent range: Pisa Range
- Topo map: NZMS260 F41 Edition 1 1991 Limited Revision 1996

Geology
- Orogeny: Kaikoura Orogeny
- Rock age: 200 Ma
- Mountain type: Fault-block mountain
- Rock type: Schist

The Pisa Range is a mountain range in Central Otago, in the South Island of New Zealand. It lies on the western shore of the man-made Lake Dunstan and overlooks the town of Cromwell. Its highest point, Mount Pisa, is 1,963 m (6,440 feet).

== Geography ==
The massif, which includes the Pisa and Criffel Ranges, is deeply dissected by Luggate Creek to the north and the Roaring Meg to the south, both of which have seen historical alluvial gold mining. Rising over 1,700 m (5,600 ft) above Lake Dunstan, the Pisa Range is the gateway to the Upper Clutha Valley. From land settlement to goldrushes, from orchards to the rising of Lake Dunstan and now to the coming of the grapes, the area has seen massive change in the past 150 years.

The Pisa Range is the highest of the fault-block mountains characteristic of the Central Otago region, and one of the most distinctive land forms and ecological systems in New Zealand. The summit landscape is a broad, gently sloping undulatory dome, in places up to 8 km (5.0 mi) wide, falling steeply to the Clutha Valley floor. The Criffel Range forms part of the greater Pisa Range fault block mountain range that separates the Cardrona Valley from the Upper Clutha Valley.

Elevation ranges from approximately 450 to 1,963 m (1,476 to 6,440 ft) at the highest point. The aerial extent of the range is defined by the Clutha River / Lake Dunstan to the north and east, while the Cardrona River and Kawarau River lie on the western and southern boundaries, respectively.

There are two primary catchment areas which drain to the north and south. Luggate Creek flows into the Clutha River from the northern end of the range (at Luggate), while the Roaring Meg flows into the Kawarau River at the southern end of the range. Numerous alpine tarns occupy cirque basins, the largest of which is Lake McKay at 0.03 km^{2} (0.012 sq mi) and 1,692 m (5,551 ft) elevation.

== Geology ==
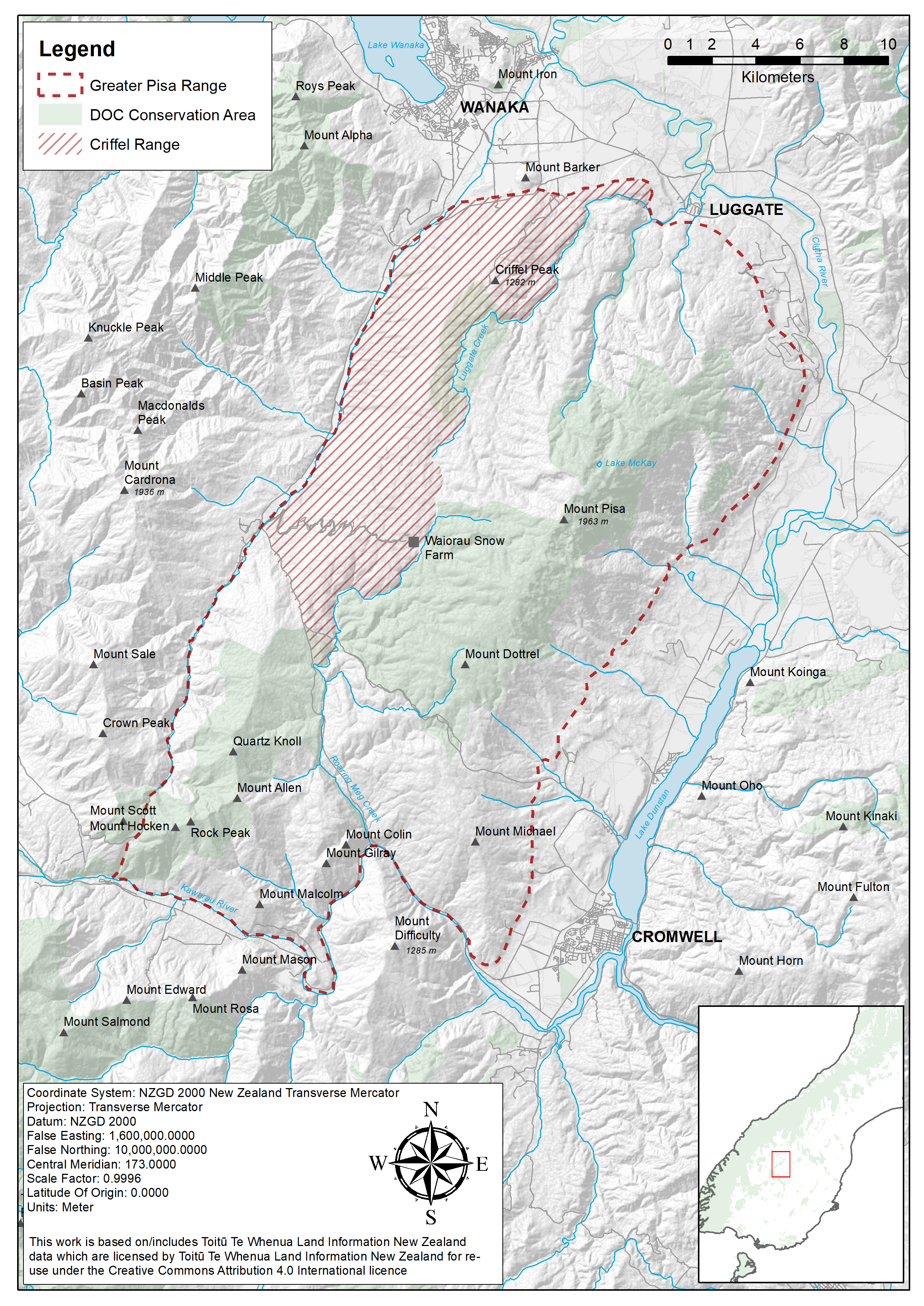
Map of the Pisa and Criffel Ranges, Central Otago, New Zealand

The Pisa Range forms part of the characteristic basin and range topography throughout Central Otago. The basement rock is formed from the Haast Schist Group, grey quartzofeldspathic metagreywacke interlayered with micaceous meta-argillite and greenschist formed during the Rangitata Orogeny. The schist in Central Otago has a well-defined pervasive schistosity, with shallow dips defining the broad regional-scale warps in schistosity caused during Miocene deformation (the Kaikoura orogeny). The warped geometries are antiformal over mountain ranges and synformal under the intervening basins. Associated reverse faulting (the Otago fault system) along the southeastern flanks of many Central Otago mountain ranges (i.e. Taieri Range, Lammermoor Range, Rock and Pillar Range, Rough Ridge, Raggedy Range, Dunstan Mountains, Pisa Range) gives rise to the basin and range topography of parallel ridges and basins.

During the Cretaceous, regional uplift and erosion brought the Textural Zone IV schists to the surface, and an extensive low-relief surface was produced over the entire region. The tops of the ranges in many places are still represented by this erosion surface, often called the Otago Peneplain, though a more recent interpretation of the surface argues for it to be called the Waipounamu Erosion Surface. This is what gives rise to the broad smooth domal surface at the crest of the Pisa Range.

Schist tors or rock pillars, have been left exposed, potentially as remnants of more resistant rock resulting from the Waipounamu Erosion Surface. Though their formation is not well understood, they often occur as large rocky outcrops and are characteristic of the Central Otago landscape. John Turnbull Thomson and Alexander Garvie's naming of the schist tor on Mount Pisa was so-named because of its similarity to the Leaning Tower of Pisa. The 26 m (85 ft) Obelisk or Kopuwai is a nearby similar schist tor on the Old Man Range.

Tertiary sediments of the Manuherikia Group and Maori Bottom Formation were deposited by fluvial systems across the erosion surface. Once covering most or all of the Central Otago region, these sediments have been stripped off the rising mountain ranges and are now preserved only in the basins. Many of these sediments contained gold, leading to numerous gold rushes in Central Otago.

== History ==
=== Etymology ===
The Pisa Range, and specifically Mount Pisa, was the name given in 1857 by the Chief Surveyor of the Otago Province, John Turnbull Thomson and his assistant Alexander Garvie. Mount Pisa was so named because of the fancied resemblance of a rock to the Leaning Tower of Pisa. On their sketch chart it was shown as Pesa (itself the name of a river in Tuscany).

The Māori name of Mount Pisa is Taraputa, named for Tara Putakitaki, an early Kāti Māmoe chief.

Pisa is pronounced Pie-zer by the locals.

The name Criffel originates in Dumfries and Galloway, Scotland, where a number of the early settlers to the Otago region came from. The Criffel is a hill of 570 m (1,870 ft), significantly smaller than its New Zealand eponym, Criffel Peak, at 1,282 m (4,206 ft).

=== Māori ===
The first settlers in the region were the Māori as they travelled through Central Otago en route to the West Coast on pounamu expeditions, as well as in search of seasonal food resources. Early Māori archaeological sites are concentrated on the lower flanks of the Pisa Range and include moa ovens with associated moa bones (e.g. near Luggate and Gibbston Flat).

=== Gold mining ===
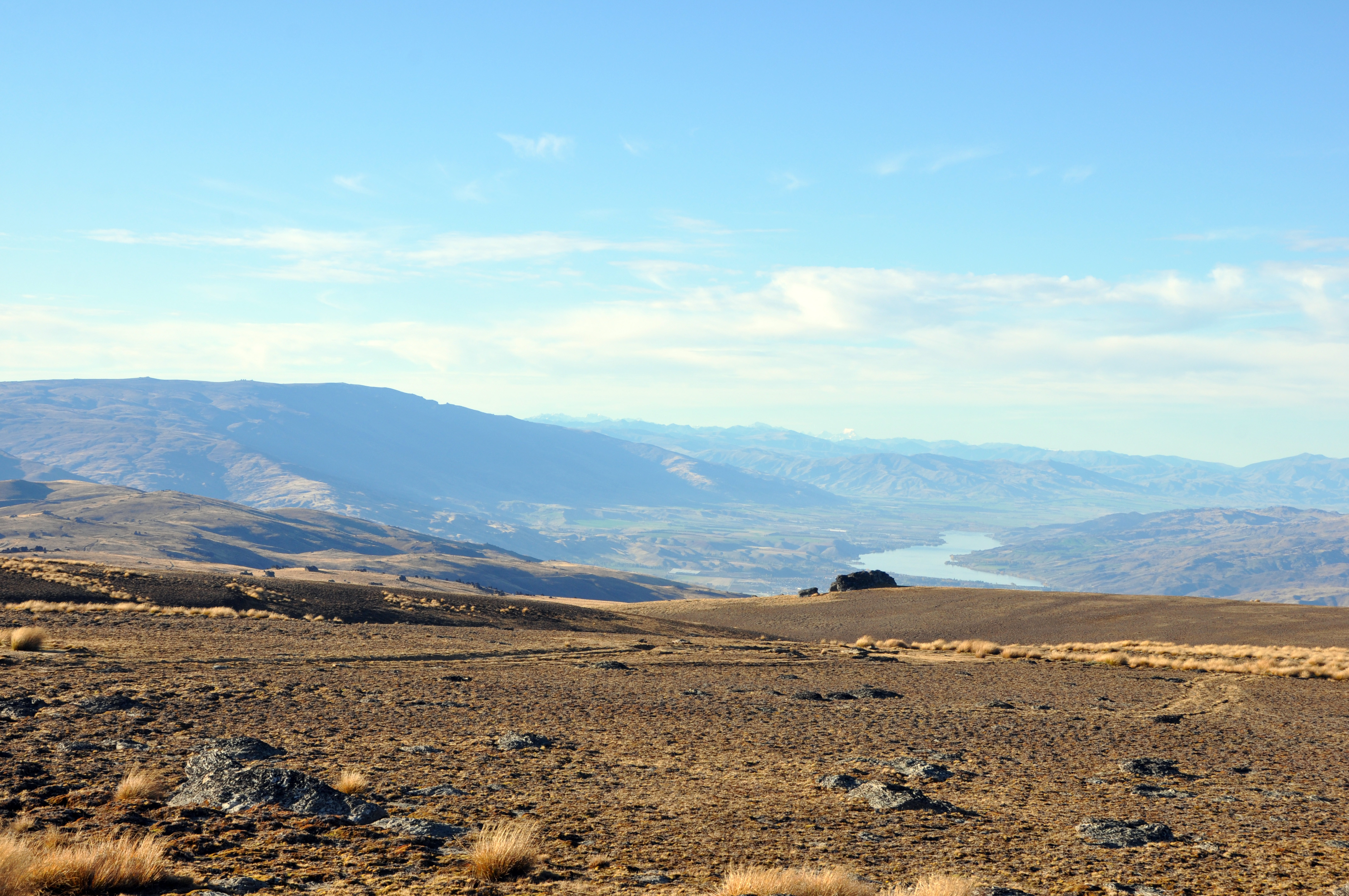
View of the Pisa Range (middle foreground, left) from the Nevis Range

Gold mining occurred along a line of gold-bearing gravel deposits stretching from the Criffel Range up to Mt Pisa. The area contains a myriad of gold mining sites dating from 1885 up until the early 1900s. Key remnants can be found on the Criffel Range, Lower Luggate Creek, the Kawerau Gorge, Gentle Annie, Roaring Meg, Tuohys Gully and the Cardrona Valley. These sites include sluicings, dray tracks, huts, tent sites, dams, race complexes and sluice pits.

These gravels have been mined at the high fields of Criffel and Fatboys and along a fault line in the upper Roaring Meg. As well as the two major gold-bearing creeks there are terraces of stranded materials all round the skirts of the Pisa Range, in the Kawarau Gorge, along the Cardrona Valley (notably the Criffel Edge), Mid Run on the north face of the Criffel Range and along the Clutha terraces, especially at Gravelly Gully and around Lowburn.

Gold on the Criffel Range was discovered in 1883 by a small group of miners led by Cardrona miner, farmer, and musterer, John Halliday. The Halliday party struggled for two years before they managed to discover any significant finds at what was to become the Criffel Diggings (44°47′00″S 169°09′25″E). By 1885 around fifty miners were working the diggings and between them, they had sold 1,100 oz (31 kg) in the previous season. Mining continued into the 1890s with 27 miners taking 700 t oz (21.8 kg) in 1893. Mining ended in the first decade of the 20th Century. Around 2,000 t oz (62.2 kg) of gold was produced per year, although the figures are uncertain, as much of it went undeclared.

The Criffel Diggings goldfield was the last to be discovered in the Otago Region, some 25 years after gold was discovered in Gabriel's Gully. At around 1,200 to 1,350 m (3,940 to 4,430 ft) elevation, the Criffel Diggings are also one of the highest in New Zealand.

=== Pastoral ===
Up until recently, the Pisa District was primarily farm land. The larger stations on the Pisa Range include (but are not limited to) Mount Pisa Station, Locharburn Station, Waitiri Station, Eastbourne Station, Waiorau Station and Criffel Station. Mt Pisa Station has a long and continuous history o the Pisa Range, with its original homestead being built in 1865. The farm was subdivided following the First World War as part of the Discharged Soldiers' Settlement Act. Today, Pisa Station is a 4,691 ha (11,590 acres) sheep and cattle farm that has been in the same family since 1924.

Sheep and cattle grazing continue to constitute the greatest land use of the Pisa Range (aerially), despite continued tenure reviews.

== Modern uses ==
=== Orchards and vineyards ===
Whilst not strictly on the Pisa Range itself, numerous stone fruit orchards and vineyards carpet the terraces at the foot of the range. Some take their name directly from the Pisa Range itself.

Most orchards and vineyards occupy the sandy gravels to the east of the Pisa Range, though several vineyards are located to the north near Queensbury and Cardrona.

=== Tourism ===
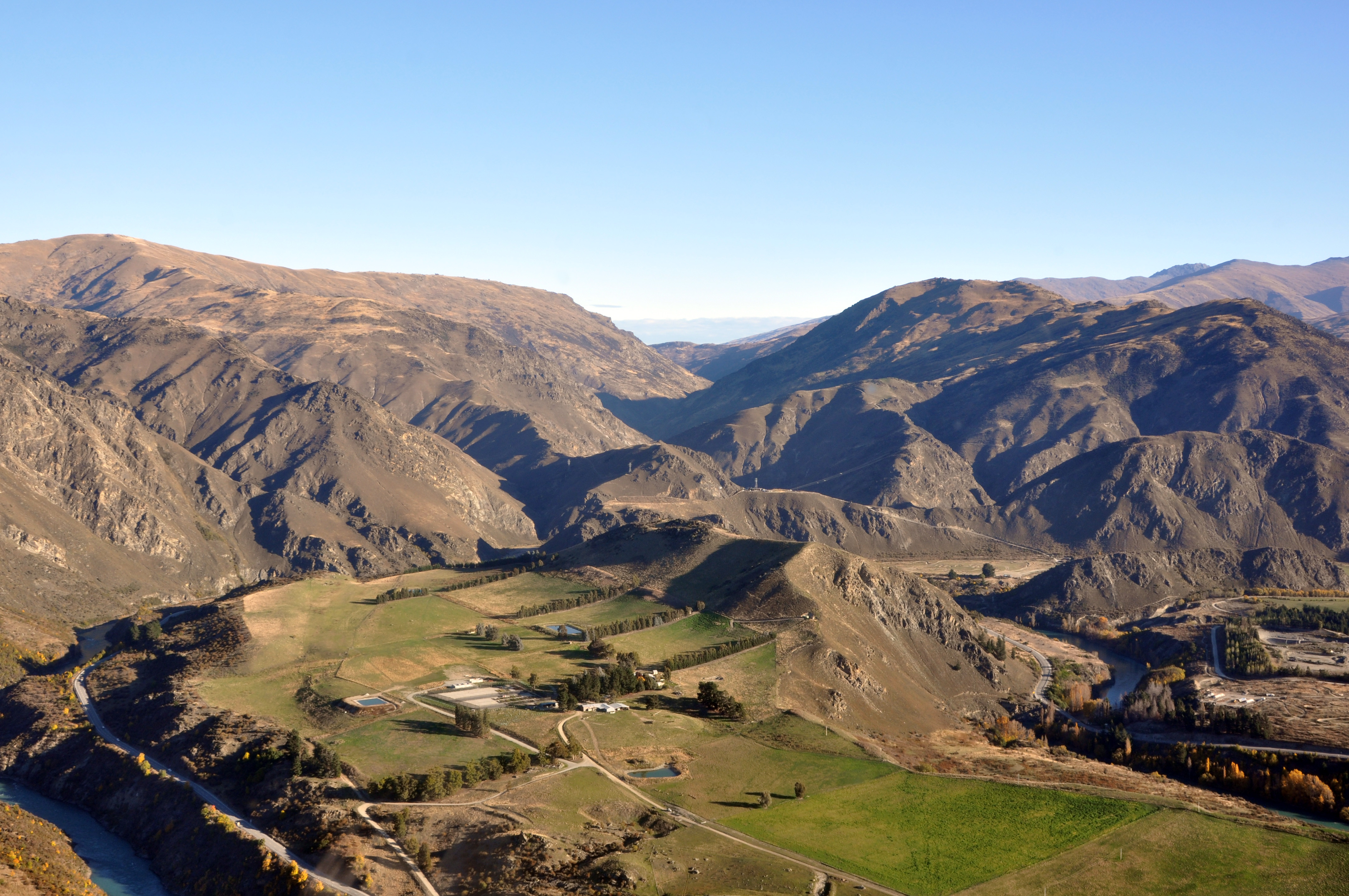
Waitiri Bend, on the Kawarau River. The most southerly tip of the greater Pisa Range.

Numerous trails cross the Pisa Range, many of which are publicly accessible via the Pisa Range Conservation Area. Trails are typically 4-wheel drive only, but offer hiking and mountain biking opportunities linking the Crown Range, Cardrona, Luggate and Cromwell.

=== Waiorau Snow Farm / Southern Hemisphere proving grounds ===
The Waiorau Snow Farm features 55 km (34 mi) of trails, a conference centre has accommodation for about 60 people. It is located on the Pisa range close to Cardrona, at an altitude of approx 1,600 m. The area is used for cross country skiing in the winter and during the summer months for altitude training with trails climbing out to 2000m. The proximity of Wānaka (275m) and Queenstown (310m) and the training options around these two towns makes the Snow Farm one of the best locations in the Southern Hemisphere for a live high, train low training regime.

The Waiorau Snow Farm borders the Southern Hemisphere Proving Grounds, a vehicle testing facility. Both venues use the same access road on the western flank of the Pisa Range.

== Ecology and climate ==
The Pisa Range has a dry sub-continental climate, somewhat typical of Central Otago. Annual rainfall ranges from 600 mm (24 in) at the Cardrona River to 1,500 mm (59 in) at the crest of the Pisa Range. Snow lies above 1,000 m (3,300 ft) for much of the winter, persisting well into the summer months at high altitude.

On the eastern and northern flanks of the range some forest and shrubland remnants are present. The southern flanks (Kawarau) support extensive shrublands characterised by a high component of exotic species. The western (Cardrona Valley) faces are largely free of any woody vegetation. Some of the most extensive remaining woodlands are protected as scientific reserves in the vicinity of Luggate Creek and the Lochar Burn. Mid-slopes generally support short tussockland which, with increasing altitude, yield to a discontinuous band of snow tussock. High alpine cushionfields, fell fields, blue tussocklands and scree pavements cover much of the broad summit plateau. Many of the vegetation communities on the Pisa Range are botanically significant, including cushionfields on patterned ground, alpine tors, alpine fescue tussocklands, snow banks, herb seepages, native shrublands and forest remnants.

Climate data for Crest of Pisa Range
Month	Jan	Feb	Mar	Apr	May	Jun	Jul	Aug	Sep	Oct	Nov	Dec	Year
Record high °C (°F)	21.2 (70.2)	24.1 (75.4)	16.3 (61.3)	13.6 (56.5)	12.4 (54.3)	7.5 (45.5)	7.1 (44.8)	7.8 (46.0)	8.2 (46.8)	20.0 (68.0)	14.1 (57.4)	16.3 (61.3)	24.1 (75.4)
Mean maximum °C (°F)	13.6 (56.5)	13.6 (56.5)	8.5 (47.3)	7.3 (45.1)	3.9 (39.0)	1.0 (33.8)	−0.3 (31.5)	−0.3 (31.5)	1.6 (34.9)	7.9 (46.2)	7.8 (46.0)	10.2 (50.4)	13.6 (56.5)
Daily mean °C (°F)	7.2 (45.0)	7.7 (45.9)	2.1 (35.8)	1.8 (35.2)	0.2 (32.4)	−2.3 (27.9)	−4.3 (24.3)	−4.2 (24.4)	−3.3 (26.1)	0.4 (32.7)	2.0 (35.6)	3.7 (38.7)	0.9 (33.7)
Mean minimum °C (°F)	3.4 (38.1)	3.4 (38.1)	−2.8 (27.0)	−2.2 (28.0)	−2.9 (26.8)	−5.1 (22.8)	−7.8 (18.0)	−7.3 (18.9)	−7.2 (19.0)	−4.5 (23.9)	−2.7 (27.1)	−1.5 (29.3)	−7.8 (18.0)
Record low °C (°F)	−5.8 (21.6)	−2.2 (28.0)	−8.3 (17.1)	−9.1 (15.6)	−8.9 (16.0)	−11.4 (11.5)	−13.8 (7.2)	−12.1 (10.2)	−11.5 (11.3)	−11.6 (11.1)	−9.3 (15.3)	−5.9 (21.4)	−13.8 (7.2)
Source: GLORIA Site PIS-CRS (44.884°S 169.169°E) from April 2003 to March 2005. Mark et al (2006)

=== Conservation ===
In 1994 the New Zealand Government sought to determine the extent of degradation of high-country pastoral leases which subsequently lead to a tenure review. Those pastoral high-country ranges with more vulnerable ecology, suffering from extensive degradation and with significant ecosystem services were exchanged with more productive, generally lower-elevation lands.

As a result, some 23,000 ha (57,000 acres) on the Pisa Range have been relinquished from farm grazing and are now managed by the Department of Conservation as public conservation land and reserves. Completion of further tenure reviews is likely to result in the entire range crest of the two ranges returning to full Crown ownership.

The long-term monitoring within the GLORIA network revealed just how slow recovery rates of degraded upland ecosystems on the Pisa Range has been. The crest of the Pisa Range was used for extensive merino sheep summer grazing, in combination with intermittent burning. This continued to 2012 when tenure review brought this detrimental land-use practice to a halt. The average soil organic matter recovery rate in the South Island high-country is estimated to be 35 years, but for heavily degraded areas, such as the Pisa Range, the rate is even slower than that with the recovery rate of cushion plants (and subsequent soil formation) being no more than 5% over a decade.

== In popular culture ==
The Pisa Range is a frequent subject in the art of painter Grahame Sydney, who lives near Cambrians. Sydney lived briefly on Mount Pisa Station while he taught at Cromwell District High School in the early 1970s. Of particular significance is his painting of Rozzie at Pisa, which has become a New Zealand standard work, and a series of works including Fog at Stan Cotter's.
