= Cumbrian =

Cumbrian (and the underlying name Cumbria) may refer to:

- Cumbrian dialect, an English dialect spoken in Cumberland, Westmorland and surrounding northern England
- Cumbria, a ceremonial and non-metropolitan county in North West England
  - Cumbria Coast, a marine conservation zone off the coast of Cumbria
  - Cumbria League, the tier-8 rugby union league
  - University of Cumbria
- Cumberland, a historic county of North West England, now part of Cumbria
- Cumbrians, inhabitants of the Kingdom of Strathclyde in the Early Middle Ages
- Prehistoric Cumbria, modern term for the Stone Age to Iron Age (pre-Roman) area that corresponds to modern Cumbria
- Cumbrian (ship), the name of two notable ships

== See also ==
- Cambria (disambiguation), an etymologically related name for Wales, south of Cumbria/Cumberland
  - Cambrian (disambiguation)
- Cumbre (disambiguation), a unrelated Spanish word meaning 'peak', found in many place names
- Cumbric, the modern name for a Brittonic language or dialect once spoken in Cumbria and its surrounds
- Cymric (disambiguation), an etymologically related adjective that refers to Wales
- History of Cumbria
- Kombroges or Combrogi (literally 'Compatriots', 'Countrymen'), the name used for themselves by people of Roman Britain native to areas that are now North West England and Wales: see Cumbria § History
