= Kambia =

Kambia may refer to:

- Kambia (Sierra Leone)
- Kambia District in northwestern Sierra Leone
- an alternative spelling of the Greek place name Kampia (disambiguation)

== See also ==
- Cambia (disambiguation)
- Cambria (disambiguation)
- Kumbia (disambiguation)
