= La Cumbre =

La Cumbre, Spanish for 'The Peak' or 'The Summit' (in plural form, Las Cumbres), may refer to:

== Places ==
- La Cumbre (Galápagos Islands), a volcano
- Las Cumbres (volcano), a volcano in Mexico
- La Cumbre, Cáceres, a municipality in Extremadura, Spain
- La Cumbre, Córdoba, a small town in Argentina
  - La Cumbre Airport (Aeropuerto La Cumbre; codes LCM, SACC), a municipal airport in Córdoba, Argentina
- La Cumbre, Valle del Cauca, a city in Colombia
- La Cumbre Pass, another name of Uspallata Pass AKA Bermejo Pass, a mountain pass in the Andes that connects Santiago and Los Andes, Chile, with Mendoza, Argentina
- La Cumbre Peak, a mountain in California, US
- La Cumbre Plaza, an outdoor shopping center in Santa Barbara, California, US
- Las Cumbres, a corregimiento in Panamá District, Panamá Province, Panama
- The Boarding School: Las Cumbres (El internado: Las Cumbres), a Spanish mystery/drama/thriller teen-oriented television series; often referred to as Las Cumbres for short

== See also ==
- Cumbre (disambiguation) (also covers cumbres)
- En la Cumbre, album by Rigo Tovar and Costa Azul
- MV La Cumbre (originally MV Empire MacDermott), a British cargo ship
