= Hasbrouck Davis =

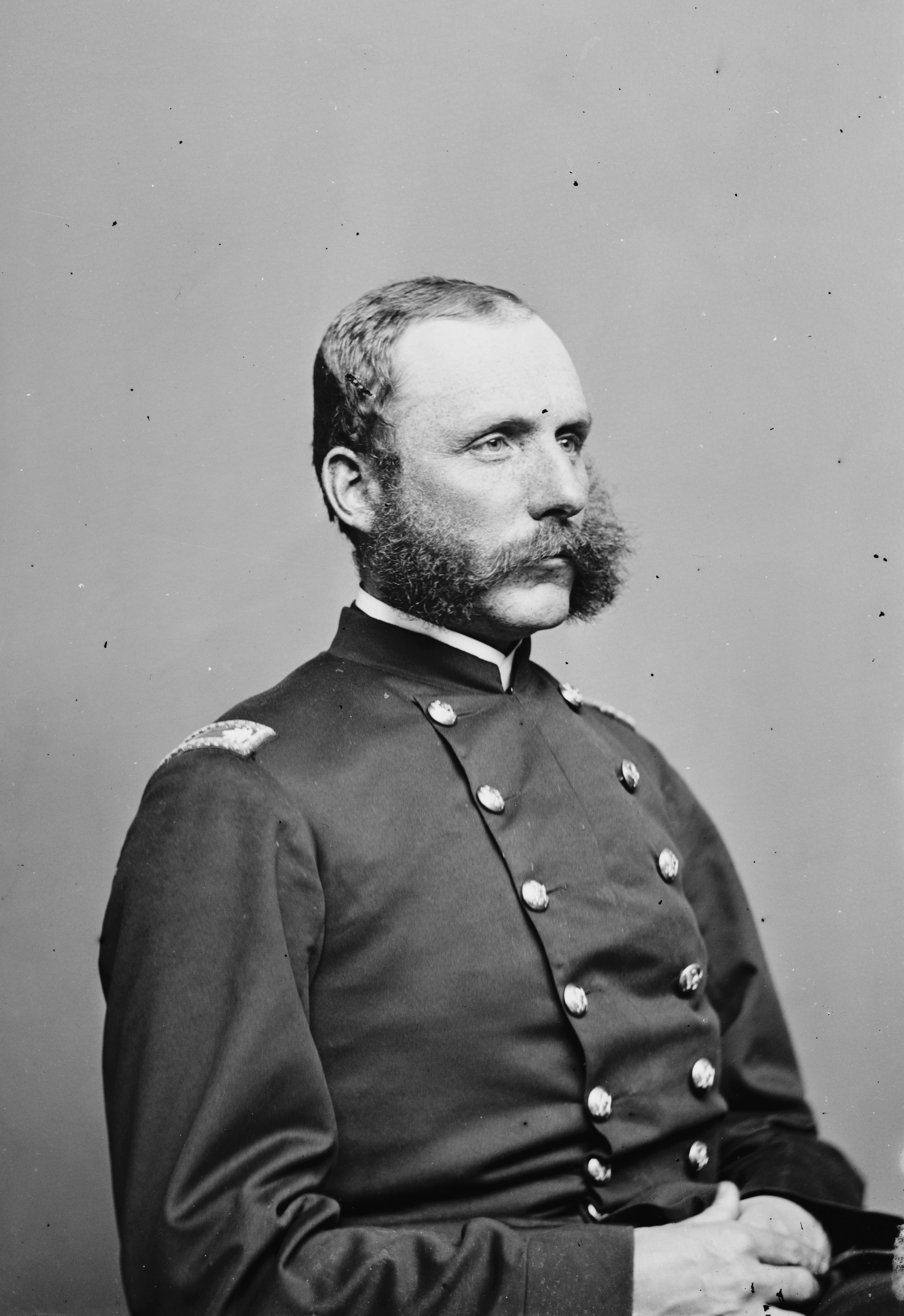
- Born: April 19, 1827; Worcester, Massachusetts
- Died: October 19, 1870 (aged 43); Northwest coast of Ireland
- Burial place: Rural Cemetery, Worcester, Massachusetts
- Relatives: Father "Honest" John Davis; Brother John Chandler Bancroft Davis
- Military career
- Allegiance: United States of America; Union
- Branch: United States Army; Union Army
- Service years: 1862–1865
- Rank: Colonel; Brevet Brigadier General
- Unit: 12th Illinois Cavalry
- Conflicts: American Civil War: Battle of Harpers Ferry; Battle of Chancellorsville

Hasbrouck Davis (April 19, 1827 - October 19, 1870) was an American general from Massachusetts. The son of prominent politician "Honest" John Davis, Davis attended Williams College and briefly taught before studying to become a Unitarian minister. He later studied law and moved to Chicago, Illinois to practice. He was mustered into service with the 12th Illinois Cavalry in 1862, later leading the regiment as a colonel. Late in his war service, he was brevetted to brigadier general. In 1870, he died in the wreck of the SS Cambria.

== Biography ==
Hasbrouck Davis was born on April 19, 1827, in Worcester, Massachusetts. He was the third son of U.S. Representative and later U.S. Senator "Honest" John Davis. He attended public schools and then matriculated at Williams College in 1841. He graduated four years later, returning to Worcester to teach at the high school. After a year, he decided to instead pursue a career in the ministry. He studied in Heidelberg, Baden to study the German language. He returned to Massachusetts in 1849, accepting the pastorship of the Unitarian church in Watertown. Davis preached for only a few years before deciding to step down to study law. He was admitted to the bar in 1854, then opened a law office in Boston. The next year, Davis decided to head west to Chicago, Illinois, opening a successful firm there.

Davis was mustered into service with the 12th Illinois Cavalry in February 1862 as a lieutenant colonel. Arriving shortly after the First Battle of Winchester, Davis was put in charge of scouting posts. On a mission around Bunker Hill, West Virginia, Davis successfully repelled a Confederate attack. The Confederates counterattacked the next morning, but Davis sent a band of forty troops out near Darkesville, West Virginia. Under Davis' command, they routed the opposing troops, killing 25, including the great-grandson of Charles Carroll of Carrollton, and taking 50 prisoners.

In October 1862, the unit's colonel Arno Voss left for the recruiting service, putting Davis in charge of the regiment until the next February. The unit saw action at the Battle of Harpers Ferry, escaping the surrounded fortification and taking a band of prisoners in the process. As part of Stoneman's 1863 Raid during the Battle of Chancellorsville, Davis was ordered to take a brigade to disrupt the Richmond, Fredericksburg & Potomac and Virginia Central Railroads. He returned to Illinois with the regiment in November 1863 to reorganize as a veteran regiment.

On January 5, 1864, he was promoted to colonel after Voss was forced to discharge due to illness. The regiment was assigned the Army of the Gulf in Louisiana, fortifying Fort Butler near Donaldsonville. On October 31, he was reassigned to Baton Rouge, Louisiana. The regiment was moved to Memphis, Tennessee on January 5, 1865, to scout for Embury D. Osband and the 3rd United States Colored Cavalry Regiment. He was brevetted a brigadier general on March 12, 1865, and was sent to George Armstrong Custer in Alexandria, Louisiana. However, he fell ill and was forced to resign on August 1. He returned to Chicago and continued to practice as a lawyer, serving one term as city attorney.

Davis married Martha W. Stickney in November 1850; they had four children. In 1870, he boarded the SS Cambria to tour Europe; the vessel sank off the coast of Ireland on October 19. Davis was one of the 178 lives lost; his body was never recovered. A cenotaph was erected in his honor at Rural Cemetery in Worcester.

== See also ==
- Davis political family
