= Grahame Sydney =

New Zealand artist (born 1948)

Sir Grahame Sydney KNZM
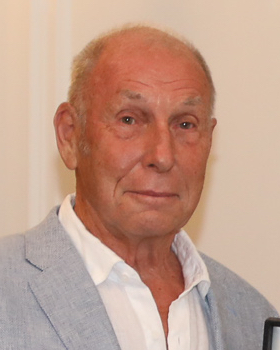
- Sydney in 2021
- Born: Grahame Charles Sydney; 1948 (age 77–78); Dunedin, New Zealand
- Education: University of Otago
- Known for: Painter

Sir Grahame Charles Sydney KNZM (born 1948) is a New Zealand visual artist, based in the South Island region of Central Otago. Since beginning his professional art life in 1974 he has worked as a painter (in egg tempera, oil and watercolour), printmaker (etching and lithography), photographer and writer.

== Biography ==
Born in Dunedin in 1948, the youngest of three children, Sydney gained a degree in English and Geography at University of Otago. In 1971 he began work as a secondary school teacher, and after two years spent time in London and Europe before returning to begin his career as an artist in May 1974. Four years later, in 1978 he was awarded the Francis Hodgkins Fellowship by the University of Otago. Since then he has lived variously between Dunedin, Mount Pisa Cottage near Cromwell and Central Otago.

Sydney did not attend art school saying that "I didn't want to be anything else but a seventeenth-century Dutch painter. No one would teach me that in the art schools, so I thought it would be a waste of time. And I sure as hell didn't want to spend a year doing ceramics. I just wanted to learn everything I could about what I thought was wonderful - Vermeer, say".

Sydney has two children with his first wife Roslyn. He now lives and works in Cambrian Valley with his wife Fiona.

== Works ==
His subject matter focuses largely on the sparse elements of human impact on Otago's empty landscapes and the loneliness of individuals in this remote setting. In recent years, he has also consistently produced figure studies of his wife Fiona as model. Many of his works feature the landforms of Central Otago, especially those around the Pisa Range close to Sydney's home.

Sydney's works have drawn comparisons with such artists as Edward Hopper, Vilhelm Hammershoi, Christopher Pratt and Andrew Wyeth but his images are saturated with a profound sense of the New Zealand south.

Sydney has been the subject of several major exhibitions. His work is held in public institutions (including Museum of New Zealand Te Papa Tongarewa and the Dunedin Public Art Gallery) and private collections in New Zealand and throughout the world (including Elton John). The New Zealand government gave a painting of his to Nelson Mandela.

He now rarely exhibits publicly, occasionally collaborating with galleries but mainly working with a private client list. He said, in 2016, that he no longer takes commissions. "I've got a very nice long list of people who have indicated they'd love to own something of mine and when I finish a painting, someone will get a phone call from me... Being on the list is not a guarantee...I don't do that many paintings, I'm a slow and patient worker and in a good year, I'd be lucky to get six done.''

In the 2004 New Year Honours, Sydney was made an Officer of the New Zealand Order of Merit, for services to painting. In the 2021 Queen's Birthday Honours, he was promoted to Knight Companion of the New Zealand Order of Merit, for services to art.

Several books have been published on Sydney's work: Grahame Sydney Paintings: 1974–2014 (2014); The Art of Grahame Sydney (1999); Timeless Land (1995). Two books of his photography have been published: White Silence: Grahame Sydney's Antarctica (2008) and Grahame Sydney's Central Otago (2011). In 2009 he wrote Promised Land, a history of the Otago goldfields. In 2020, Grahame Sydney co-authored a book called Landmarks with Brian Turner and Owen Marshall.

Grahame Sydney says that "My work is not in the leading public galleries...I am a representative of the 'painting-is-dead' school".
