= Cambio =

Cambio is the Spanish word for "change", and may refer to:

Publications

- Cambio (magazine), a Colombian political magazine
- Cambio (newspaper), a Bolivian newspaper

Entertainment and games

- Cambio (band), a Filipino band
- Perissone Cambio, 16th century musician
- Built By Girls, formerly known as Cambio.com, an online news/entertainment website (AOL brand)
- Cambio (card game), early name for the popular Swedish game of Kille
- Cabo (game), a modern card game sometimes known as Cambio

Other

- Cambio 90, a Peruvian political party
- Currency exchange, term associated with exchanging one currency for another
- Cambio Healthcare Systems, a Swedish healthcare company

== See also ==
- Cambia (disambiguation)
