= Cumbrian (ship) =

Several vessels have been named Cumbrian dialect, for Cumbria:

- Cumbrian (1803 ship) was launched at Bombay, possibly at the Bombay Dockyard. She was a "country ship", generally trading east of the Cape of Good Hope. She also made three voyages for the British East India Company. She was sold in 1835.
- Cumbrian (1811 ship) was launched at Shields. Initially, Cumbrian was a transport. After 1814 or so she became a West Indiaman. In 1817 she made one voyage to Bengal, sailing under a licence from the British East India Company. In 1819 she became a whaler, sailing from Kingston upon Hull to the Northern Whale Fishery. From 1835 on she left whaling and started trading more widely, to North America, Bombay, and Africa. She was driven ashore in August 1844, refloated, and subsequently condemned.
