= Kampia =

Kampia may refer to several villages in Cyprus and Greece:

- Kampia, Chania, a village in the Chania regional unit, Crete
- Kampia, Euboea, a village in Euboea
- Kampia, Chios, a village on Chios
- Kampia, Phthiotis, a village in Phthiotis
- Kampia, Cyprus, a village near Pera Orinis
