= Glowing Plant project =

Crowdfunded synthetic biology campaign

The Glowing Plant project was the first crowdfunding campaign for a synthetic biology application. The project was started by the Sunnyvale-based hackerspace Biocurious as part of the DIYbio philosophy. According to the project's goals, funds were used to create a glowing Arabidopsis thaliana plant using firefly luminescence genes. Long-term ambitions (never realized) included the development of glowing trees that can be used to replace street lights, reducing CO_{2} emissions by not requiring electricity.

In 2023, this concept was finally achieved, commercialized, and brought to market by Light Bio, who used a fungal luminescence gene in petunias to achieve the first commercially available luminescent plants. As of 2024, these are currently only available in the US.

== Project funding ==
Using Kickstarter, the project's founders raised $484,000 on June 8, 2013. This was significantly more than the initial target of $65,000.

Seeds were initially scheduled to be delivered in April 2014, and subsequently scheduled for the fall of 2014. In March 2016, delivery of seeds was forecast for 2016 on the Glowing Plant website. The company encountered difficulty in producing plants that emit significant amounts of light, resulting in a transition to producing moss that emits a patchouli scent. They later announced via email December 2017 that the company was permanently ceasing operations.

== Methods ==
Biocurious planned to tweak the biobrick containing six genes, including luciferin-regenerating enzyme and luciferase from fireflies. During initial development, they would use Agrobacterium to test the transfer of the genetic circuit. When producing the final product, they intended to instead use a gene gun to avoid issues related to regulation of GM plants. Over the course of the project, several plants were mentioned as being recipients, including Arabidopsis thaliana, Nicotiana tabacum, and roses. Issues surrounding the production included the difficulty of moving the six component genes of the metabolic pathway, increasing the dim light produced by the plant following insertion, and preventing the pathway from being silenced.

== Controversy ==
The project generated widespread media attention and a discussion of appropriate uses of biotechnology. As a result of the controversy, Kickstarter decided to prohibit genetically modified organisms as rewards to project backers.

Though the Animal and Plant Health Inspection Service (APHIS) has shown no regulatory concerns about the project, some synthetic biologists and policy researchers have questioned the project's feasibility and impact on future oversight or public opinion of synthetic biology. In particular, if the company were to encourage backers to use a genetic DIY kit themselves, additional regulatory oversight would likely occur.

== See also ==
- Cambrian Genomics
- Genotype-Phenotype Map
