= Cambia =

Cambia can mean:

- Cambia, Haute-Corse, a commune in the Haute-Corse department of France
- Cambia (non-profit organisation), an open science and biology non-profit institute based in Australia
- Cambia Health Solutions, an American health insurance company
- Cambia or cambiums, the four humours in medicine
- Cambia, a brand name for the medication diclofenac
- the plural of cambium (botany), a type of tissue found in plants

== See also ==
- Cambio (disambiguation)
- Cambria (disambiguation)
- Kambia (disambiguation)
- Cumbia, a style of music and dance
- Cumbria, a county of England
