= SS Cambria =

Cambria was the name of a number of steamships.

- SS Cambria (1848), in service with the London and North Western Railway until 1861.
- SS Cambria (1869), an Anchor Line ship wrecked off the north west coast of Ireland in 1870 with the loss of 179 lives.
- TSS Cambria (1889), in service with the London and North Western Railway from 1889 to 1894
- TSS Cambria (1897), in service with the London and North Western Railway from 1897 to 1920, renamed Arvonia, took part in Irish Civil War
- TSS Cambria (1920), in service with the London and North Western Railway from 1921 to 1923, and the London, Midland and Scottish Railway from 1923 to 1948
