= Cambrian School and College =

Cambrian School and College ক্যামব্রিয়ান স্কুল এন্ড কলেজ
- Bangladesh

Information
- Type: Private, Independent, College-preparatory, Day
- Motto: "Education for Peace, Self-Reliance & Global Opportunity"
- Established: 2004
- Founder: Ln.M.K BASHAR
- School district: Board of Intermediate and Secondary Education, Dhaka
- Principal: Bagmoyi Datta Ln. Mahbub Hasan Lingcon (Chittagong)
- Grades: Pre-primary to 12
- Gender: Coeducation
- Enrollment: 10,000
- Student to teacher ratio: 10:1
- Campus: Urban
- Colors: Black; Red
- Website: cambrian.edu.bd

Cambrian School and College is a secondary and higher secondary school in Bangladesh, run by the BSB Global Network, and established in 2004. Ln. M.K. Bashar is the chairman and Ashraful Ahsan Khan is the principal. It has 16 campuses in Dhaka and Chittagong, Bangladesh.

== BSB-Cambrian Managed Institute ==
- Cambrian School and College, Dhaka
- Cambrian College, Chittagong
- King's School and College
- Metropolitan School and College
- Winsome School and College
- Cambrian International Study Centre
- Cambrian Cultural Academy
- Cambrian International College of Aviation- CICA
- Cambrian Teachers Training Institute
- Cambrian Institute of Science and Technology
- Cambrian International Language Centre
- Akhaura Cambrian School and College, Brahmanbaria
- Madrasatu Chaleha Khatun
- Cambrian International School, Mohammadpur
