= Dixon Stansbury Miles =

Union Army officer (1804–1862)

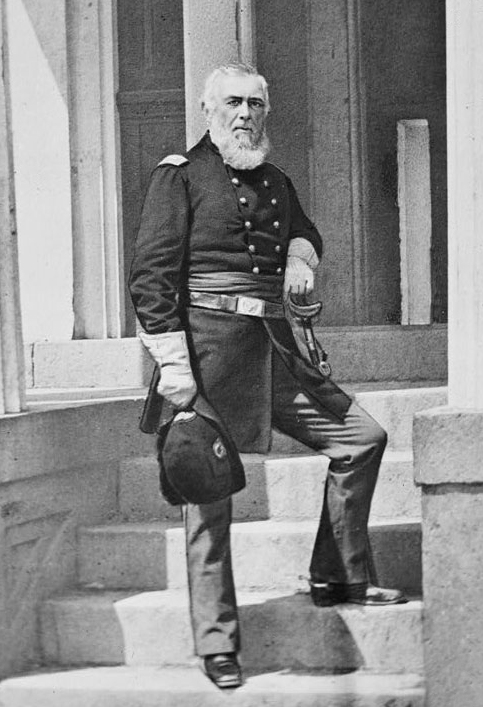
- Col. Miles at Harper's Ferry, VA
- Born: May 4, 1804; Maryland, U.S.
- Died: September 16, 1862 (aged 58); Harper's Ferry, Virginia
- Burial place: Monkton, Maryland
- Military career
- Allegiance: United States of America
- Branch: United States Army
- Service years: 1824–1862
- Rank: Colonel
- Units: 4th U.S. Infantry Regiment; 7th U.S. Infantry Regiment; 5th U.S. Infantry Regiment
- Commands: 2nd U.S. Infantry Regiment; 5th Division, Army of Northeastern Virginia; Railroad Brigade; Post of Harper's Ferry
- Conflicts: Second Seminole War; Mexican–American War; Siege of Fort Texas; Battle of Monterrey; Siege of Veracruz; Navajo Wars; American Civil War; Bull Run campaign; First Battle of Bull Run; Maryland campaign; Battle of Harper's Ferry †

Dixon Stansbury Miles (May 4, 1804 – September 16, 1862) was a career United States Army officer who served in the Mexican–American War and the Indian Wars. He was mortally wounded as he surrendered his Union garrison in the Battle of Harpers Ferry during the American Civil War.

== Early life and military service ==
Miles was born in Maryland. He graduated from the United States Military Academy in 1824 and was commissioned a brevet second lieutenant in the 4th U.S. Infantry regiment, but was transferred immediately to the 7th U.S. Infantry Regiment, with which he served until 1847. He served on the western frontier and became adjutant of the 7th U.S. He was promoted to captain on June 8, 1836, and fought in the Seminole Wars in Florida from 1839 to 1842. At the start of the Mexican–American War, he received a brevet promotion to major for his "gallant and distinguished conduct" in the defense of Fort Brown, Texas. He fought in the Battle of Monterrey and the Siege of Veracruz, which he then governed as military commandant for four months. He was appointed a brevet lieutenant colonel for "gallant and meritorious conduct in the several conflicts at Monterrey, Mexico."

Miles spent the years before the Civil War on frontier duty battling Native Americans. In 1857 he fought against Native Americans along the Gila River, New Mexico, and against the Navajo in 1858. In 1859 he was promoted to colonel and commander of the 2nd U.S. Infantry Regiment, stationed at Fort Kearny and Fort Leavenworth.

== Civil War ==
When the Civil War started, Miles was recalled to Washington, D.C., and briefly commanded a brigade in the division of Maj. Gen. Robert Patterson before being transferred to the army of Brig. Gen. Irvin McDowell, in which he commanded a division of two brigades. During the First Battle of Bull Run, his division was in reserve, but he was accused by Brig. Gen. Israel B. Richardson of being drunk during the battle. A court of inquiry validated this accusation; and, after an eight-month leave of absence, he was reassigned to what should have been a quieter post. In March 1862 he commanded a brigade that defended the Baltimore and Ohio Railroad and, in September 1862 he was given command of the U.S. arsenal at Harpers Ferry.

=== Harpers Ferry ===
During the Maryland Campaign, in which Confederate general Robert E. Lee invaded the U.S. state of Maryland, Col. Miles's garrison at Harpers Ferry stood directly on Lee's supply line through the Shenandoah Valley. He was ordered by General-in-chief Henry W. Halleck to hold the important U.S. arsenal and railroad bridges until he was relieved by Union forces under Maj. Gen. George B. McClellan. Lee sent columns converging from three directions to surround Harpers Ferry. Unfortunately for him and his army, Miles apparently treated his orders to defend the town too literally and stationed most of his 14,000 men just outside the town to the west, on Bolivar Heights, neglecting the commanding heights to the northeast (Maryland Heights) and to the south (Loudoun Heights). When his token defensive force on Maryland Heights was defeated, the town was surrounded and virtually indefensible. When Confederate Maj. Gen. Stonewall Jackson began to bombard the town on September 15, 1862, from the heights he had seized, Miles held a council of war with his brigade commanders and decided to surrender. Before the white flag could be raised, he was struck in the left leg by an exploding shell, mortally wounding him. Some of his men accused him of being drunk on duty again and were so thoroughly disgusted by his inept defense that it was said to be difficult to find a man to carry him to the hospital. Miles died the next day and is buried in St. James Episcopal Church Cemetery in Monkton, Maryland.

His daughter married CSA Major O'Bannon, who moved to Cuba after the war.

== Legacy ==
Some historians have concluded that Miles was struck by artillery deliberately fired by his own men, but there is no conclusive proof. The resulting surrender of 12,419 men was the largest number of U.S. soldiers surrendered until the Battle of Bataan in World War II. The court of inquiry into the surrender denounced Miles for "incapacity, amounting to almost imbecility".
