= SS Cambria (1869) =

Coordinates: 55°27′N 07°14′W

History

United Kingdom
- Name: SS Cambria
- Namesake: Cambria
- Owner: Anchor Line
- Port of registry: Glasgow
- Route: Glasgow–Moville–New York City
- Builder: Robert Duncan & Co., Port Glasgow
- Launched: 1 March 1869
- Maiden voyage: 8 May 1869
- Identification: Official number: 60421
- Fate: Wrecked, 19 October 1870

General characteristics
- Type: Cargo-passenger ship
- Tonnage: 1,312 GRT
- Tons burthen: 1,997 tons bm
- Length: 324 ft 7 in (98.93 m)
- Beam: 35 ft 2 in (10.72 m)
- Depth: 22 ft 6 in (6.86 m)
- Propulsion: 400 hp (298 kW) 2-cylinder steam engine, single screw
- Sail plan: Barque-rigged
- Speed: 12 knots (22 km/h; 14 mph)

SS Cambria was a British cargo-passenger steamship wrecked off the north-west of Ireland on 19 October 1870 with the loss of 178 lives.

== Ship history ==
The iron-hulled ship was built at the Robert Duncan & Co. shipyard in Port Glasgow for the Anchor Line, to operate on the trans-Atlantic route. She was launched on 1 March 1869, and sailed on her maiden voyage on 8 May, sailing from Glasgow, and calling at Moville in County Donegal, Ireland, before heading across the Atlantic to New York City.

=== Sinking ===
Cambria departed New York on 8 October 1870 under the command of Captain John Carnighan, carrying a general cargo, a crew of 74, and 105 passengers, on only her twelfth Atlantic crossing. Around 11.00 pm on 19 October the ship was sailing in heavy seas when she struck Tor Beg rock, half a mile north-west of Inishtrahull Island, which is about 6 miles north-east of Malin Head. Lifeboats were launched, but the only survivor was a passenger named John M'Gartland. He had left the ship aboard a lifeboat with about 15 other passengers. The boat almost immediately capsized and all the occupants were thrown into the sea. When M'Gartland regained consciousness he found himself clinging to the boat, which had righted itself. After climbing back into the boat and he found no one aboard except the corpse of a lady passenger dressed in black silk. M'Gartland drifted for several hours before being rescued by the SS Enterprise.

Four lifeboats were found empty at the Giant's Causeway, while the stern of the ship drifted ashore at Islay, Scotland.

Among the notable people who were victims of the sinking was Retired General Hasbrouck Davis.
