= Cambria (journal) =

Defunct Welsh geography academic journal

Cambria: A Welsh Geographical Review
- Discipline: European studies, Geography
- Language: English

Publication details
- History: 1974–1989
- Frequency: Annually

Standard abbreviations
- ISO 4: Cambria

Indexing
- ISSN: 0306-9796
- OCLC no.: 4297603

Cambria: A Welsh Geographical Review was a journal published in Wales between 1974 and 1989. Though edited by members of the Geography Departments of Swansea University and Aberystwyth University, the publication was run as an independent business, and production values were basic. Cambria was an annual English-language academic journal containing articles and book reviews on geographical and related topics. It has been digitized by the Welsh Journals Online project at the National Library of Wales.
