= Battle of Harpers Ferry =

Battle of the American Civil War

Coordinates: 39.3228°N 77.7302°W

- Part of the American Civil War
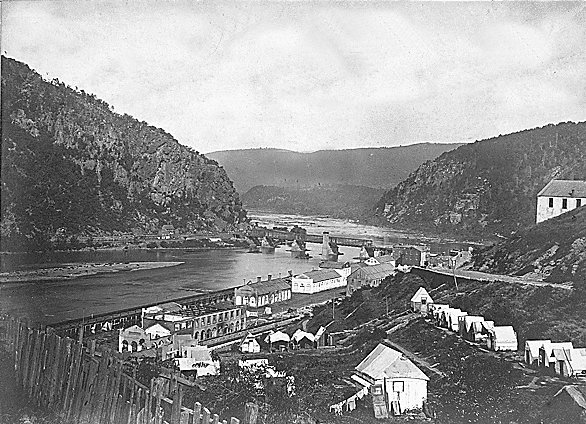
- Harpers Ferry in 1865
Date	September 12–15, 1862
Location	Jefferson County, West Virginia, Loudoun County, Virginia, and Washington County, Maryland
Result	Confederate victory

Belligerents
United States (Union)	(Confederate States of America) Confederate States

Commanders and leaders
(United States) Dixon S. Miles † (United States) Julius White	Stonewall Jackson; A.P. Hill

Strength
14,000	21,000–26,000

Casualties and losses
12,636 total 44 killed 173 wounded 12,419 captured	286 total 39 killed 247 wounded

The Battle of Harpers Ferry was fought September 12–15, 1862, as part of the Maryland Campaign of the American Civil War. As Confederate Army General Robert E. Lee's Confederate army invaded Maryland, a portion of his army under Major General Thomas J. "Stonewall" Jackson surrounded, bombarded, and captured the Union garrison at Harpers Ferry, Virginia (now West Virginia).

As Lee's Army of Northern Virginia advanced down the Shenandoah Valley into Maryland, he planned to capture the garrison at Harpers Ferry to secure his line of supply back to Virginia. Although he was being pursued at a leisurely pace by Major General George B. McClellan's Army of the Potomac, outnumbering him more than two to one, Lee chose the risky strategy of dividing his army and sent one portion to converge and attack Harpers Ferry from three directions. Colonel Dixon S. Miles, Union commander at Harpers Ferry, insisted on keeping most of the troops near the town instead of taking up commanding positions on the surrounding heights. The slim defenses of the most important position, Maryland Heights, first encountered the approaching Confederates on September 12, but only brief skirmishing ensued. Strong attacks by two Confederate brigades on September 13 drove the Union troops from the heights.

During the fighting on Maryland Heights, the other Confederate columns arrived and were astonished to see that critical positions to the west and south of town were not defended. Jackson methodically positioned his artillery around Harpers Ferry and ordered Maj. Gen. A.P. Hill to move down the west bank of the Shenandoah River in preparation for a flank attack on the Federal left the next morning. By the morning of September 15, Jackson had positioned nearly 50 guns on Maryland Heights and at the base of Loudoun Heights. He began a fierce artillery barrage from all sides and ordered an infantry assault. Miles realized that the situation was hopeless and agreed with his subordinates to raise the white flag of surrender. Before he could surrender personally, he was mortally wounded by an artillery shell and died the next day. After processing more than 12,000 Union prisoners, Jackson's men then rushed to Sharpsburg, Maryland, to rejoin Lee for the Battle of Antietam.

== Background ==
Maryland Campaign, actions September 3–15, 1862 Confederate Union

Harpers Ferry is a small town at the confluence of the Potomac River and the Shenandoah River, the site of a historic Federal arsenal founded by President George Washington in 1799 and a bridge for the critical Baltimore and Ohio Railroad across the Potomac. In 1859 it was the site of the abolitionist John Brown's attack on the Federal arsenal.

At the time the garrison at Harpers Ferry – officially the Railroad Brigade of the Middle Department, Eighth Army Corps, the purpose of which was to protect the strategically vital Baltimore and Ohio Railroad and Chesapeake and Ohio Canal, where they passed through the area, and the lower Shenandoah Valley—was the last remaining sizable Union force south of the Potomac River, consisting of about 10,400 men, later joined by 2,500 from the Union garrison at Martinsburg—plus a large cache of small arms as well as artillery pieces, wagons, and Union uniforms. The town was virtually indefensible, as it was dominated on all sides by higher ground. To the west, the ground rose gradually for about a mile and a half to Bolivar Heights, a plateau 669 feet (204 m) high, that stretches from the Potomac to the Shenandoah; further west and parallel was Schoolhouse Ridge. To the south, across the Shenandoah, Loudoun Heights overlooks from 1,180 feet (360 m). And to the northeast, across the Potomac, the southernmost extremity of Elk Ridge forms the 1,476-foot-high crest of Maryland Heights. A Federal soldier wrote that if these three heights could not be held, Harpers Ferry would be "no more defensible than a well bottom."

As Gen. Robert E. Lee's Army of Northern Virginia (ANV) advanced into Maryland, Lee expected that the Union garrisons that potentially blocked his supply line in the Shenandoah Valley, at Winchester, Martinsburg, and Harpers Ferry, would be cut off and abandoned without firing a shot, but the garrisons, Harpers Ferry specifically, were still manned. Lee planned to capture the garrison to secure his logistical support and potential retreat back to Virginia.

Although he was being pursued at a measured pace by Maj. Gen. George B. McClellan and the Union Army of the Potomac, which outnumbered him by more than two to one, Lee chose the risky strategy of dividing his army in order to seize Harpers Ferry. While the rest of the ANV remained at Boonsboro—later minus the corps of Maj. Gen. James Longstreet which Lee sent north to Hagerstown to protect against the reported movement of Pennsylvania militia there, which proved illusory—Lee sent three columns of troops to converge and attack Harpers Ferry from separate directions. The largest column, 11,500 men under Jackson, was to recross the Potomac and circle around to the west of Harpers Ferry and attack it from Bolivar Heights, while the other two columns, under Maj. Gen. Lafayette McLaws (8,000 men) and Brig. Gen. John George Walker (3,400), were to capture Maryland Heights and Loudoun Heights respectively, commanding the town from the east and south.

McClellan had wanted to add the Harpers Ferry garrison to his field army, but general-in-chief Henry Halleck had refused, saying that the movement would be too difficult and that the garrison had to defend itself "until the latest moment," or until McClellan could relieve it. Halleck had probably expected its commander, Col. Dixon Stansbury Miles, to show some military knowledge and courage. Miles was a 38-year veteran of the U.S. Army and the Mexican–American War, but who had been disgraced after the First Battle of Bull Run when a court of inquiry held that he had been drunk during the battle. Miles swore off liquor and was sent to the supposedly quiet post at Harpers Ferry. His garrison comprised 14,000 men, many inexperienced, including 2,500 who had been forced out of Martinsburg by the approach of Jackson's men on September 11.

On the night of September 11, McLaws arrived at Brownsville, 6 miles northeast of Harpers Ferry. He left 3,000 men near Brownsville Gap to protect his rear and moved 3,000 others toward the Potomac River to seal off any eastern escape route from Harpers Ferry. He dispatched the veteran brigades of Brig. Gens. Joseph B. Kershaw and William Barksdale to seize Maryland Heights on September 12. The other Confederate columns were making slow progress and were behind schedule. Jackson's men were delayed at Martinsburg. Walker's men were ordered to destroy the aqueduct carrying the Chesapeake and Ohio Canal across the Monocacy River where it empties into the Potomac, but his engineers had difficulty demolishing the stone structure and the attempt was eventually abandoned.

Walker reentered Virginia, in Loudoun County on September 9, across from Point of Rocks. Walker was escorted by Col. E.V. White, Loudoun native, and his 35th Virginia Cavalry Battalion. White was unhappy with the assignment and preferred to be with the rest of the army. Unfortunately White had gotten into an altercation with Maj. Gen. J. E. B. Stuart in Frederick and was subsequently ordered back to Virginia by Lee. White led Walker on a meandering route around the Short Hill Mountain to reach the base of Loudoun Heights four days later on September 13. So the attack on Harpers Ferry that had been planned for September 11 was delayed, increasing the risk that McClellan might engage and destroy a portion of Lee's army while it was divided.

== Battle ==
=== September 12 ===
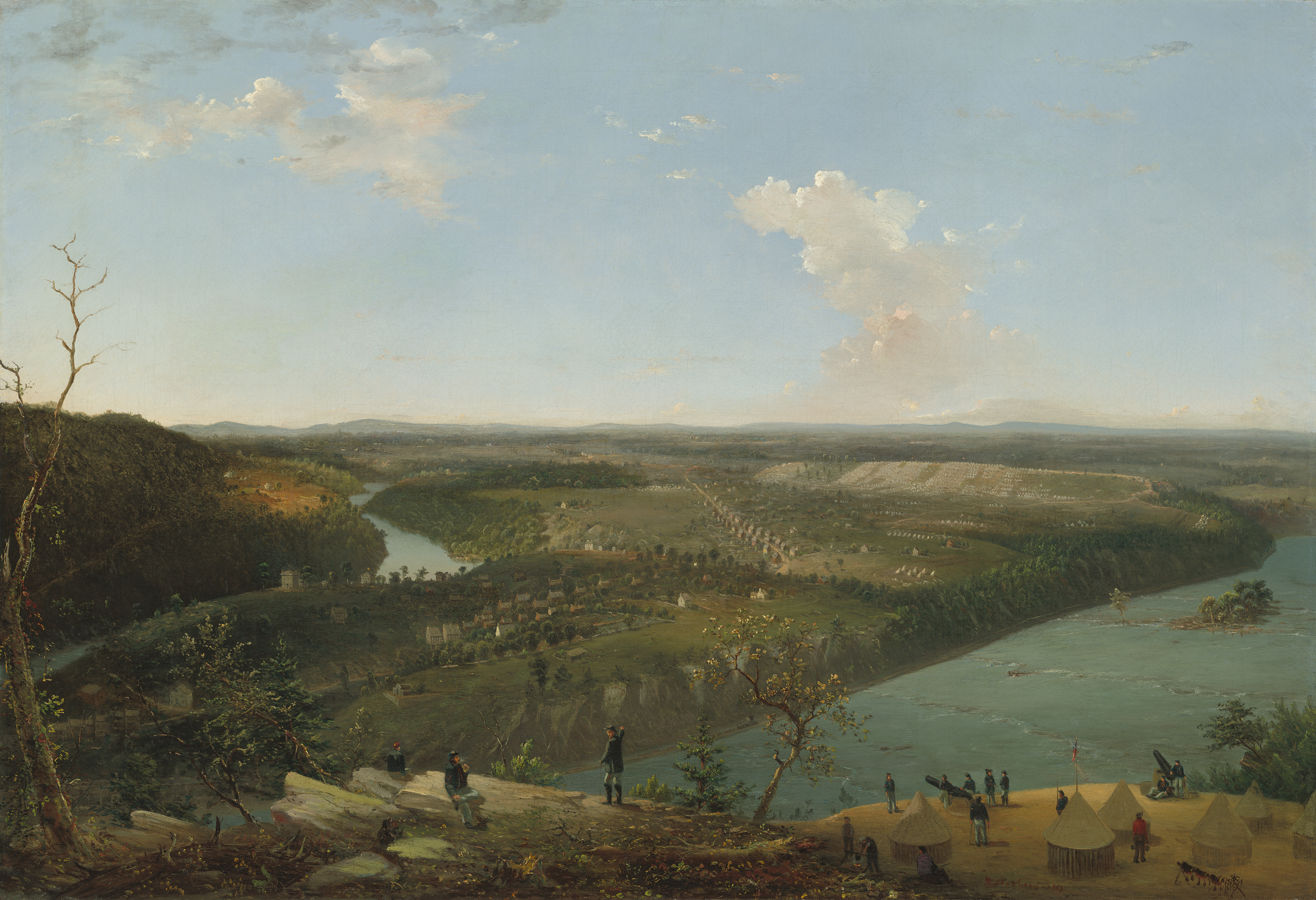
William MacLeod, Maryland Heights – Siege of Harpers Ferry, 1863

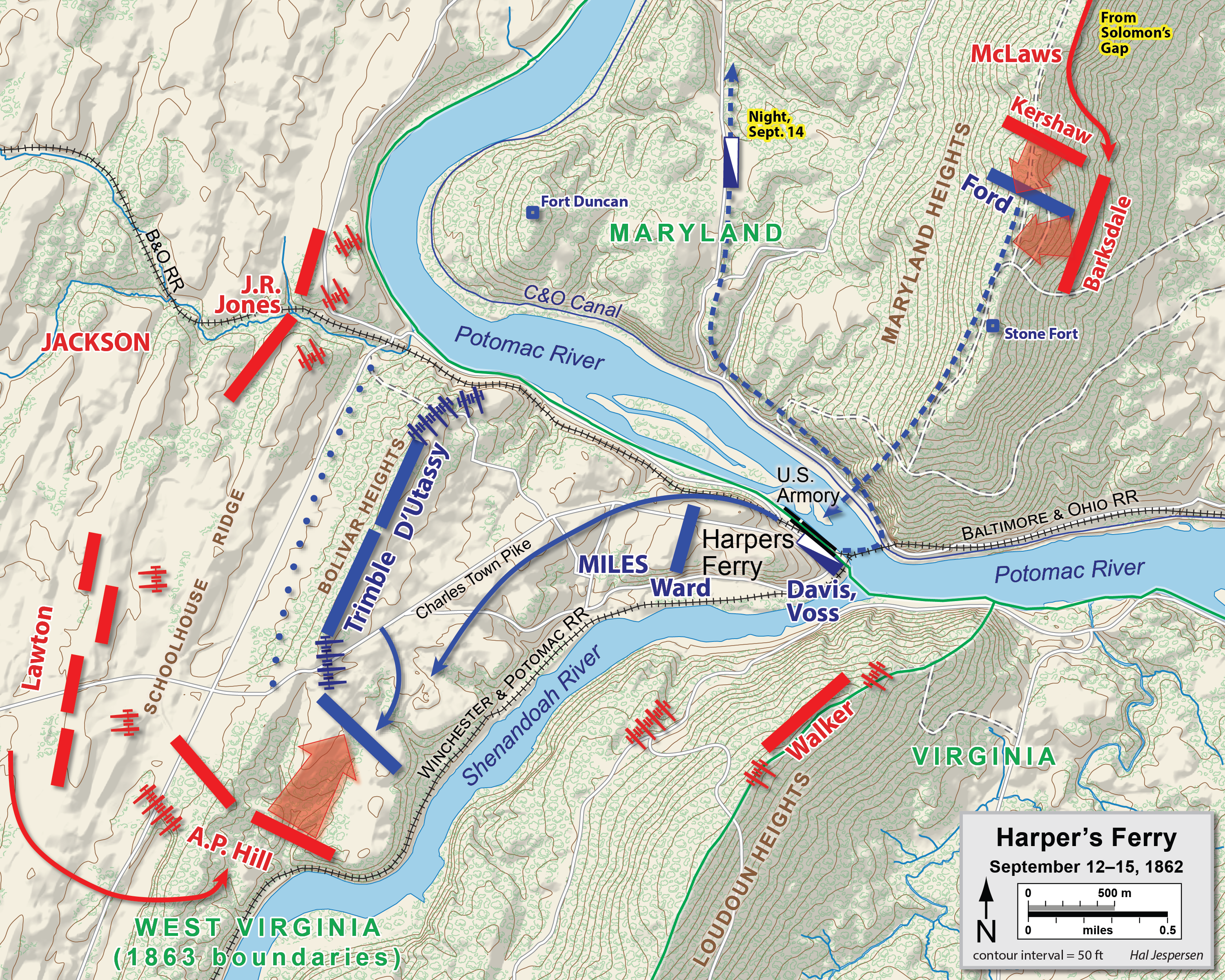
Battle of Harpers Ferry

Miles divided his 10,400 garrison troops into four brigades, making sure that the raw, inexperienced men he had recently received were balanced by more experienced soldiers. He positioned two brigades, about 7,000 men, on Bolivar Heights, in a line that stretched from the Potomac River to the Shenandoah. On nearby Camp Hill, he placed a 1,000-man brigade of heavy artillery and supporting infantry to cover the position on Bolivar Heights. Miles did not position men on Loudoun Heights, considering it the least important of the heights as he deemed it too difficult for Confederate artillery to be placed there; in any event, any Rebel force there could be attacked by the artillery on Maryland Heights. Miles did not believe that the Rebels would come by that route, and would instead approach via Bolivar Heights.

The defenses of the most important position, Maryland Heights, were designed to fight off raiders, but not to hold the heights themselves. There was a powerful artillery battery halfway up the heights: two 9-inch (230 mm) naval Dahlgren rifles, one 50-pounder Parrott rifle, and four 12-pounder smoothbores, which could protect the Camp Hill and Bolivar Heights positions. On the crest, Miles assigned Col. Thomas H. Ford of the 32nd Ohio Infantry to command parts of four regiments, 1,600 men. Some of these men, including those of the 126th New York, had been in the Army only 21 days and lacked basic combat skills; they had only just arrived at Harpers Ferry. They erected primitive breastworks and sent skirmishers a quarter-mile in the direction of the Confederates. On September 12 they encountered the approaching men from Kershaw's South Carolina brigade, who had been moving slowly through the very difficult terrain on Elk Ridge. Rifle volleys from behind abatis caused the Confederates to stop for the night.

=== September 13 ===
Kershaw began his attack at about 6:30 a.m., September 13. He planned to push his own brigade directly against the Union breastworks while Barksdale's Mississippians flanked the Federal right. Kershaw's men charged into the abatis twice and were driven back with heavy losses. The inexperienced New York troops were holding their own. Their commander, Col. Ford, felt ill that morning and stayed back two miles (3 km) behind the lines, leaving the fighting to Col. Eliakim Sherrill, the second-ranking officer. Sherrill was wounded by a minié ball through the cheek and tongue while rallying his men and had to be carried from the field, making the green troops grow panicky. As Barksdale's Mississippians approached on the flank, the New Yorkers broke and fled rearward. Although Maj. Sylvester Hewitt ordered the remaining units to reform farther along the ridge, orders came at 3:30 p.m. from Col. Ford to retreat. (In doing so, he apparently neglected to send for the 900 men of the 115th New York, waiting in reserve midway up the slope.) His men destroyed their artillery pieces and crossed a pontoon bridge back to Harpers Ferry. Ford later insisted he had the authority from Miles to order the withdrawal, but a court of inquiry concluded that he had "abandoned his position without sufficient cause," and recommended his dismissal from the Army.

During the fighting on Maryland Heights, the other Confederate columns arrived—Walker to the base of Loudoun Heights at 10 a.m. and Jackson's three divisions (Brig. Gen. John R. Jones to the north, Brig. Gen. Alexander R. Lawton in the center, and Maj. Gen. A.P. Hill to the south) to the west of Bolivar Heights at 11 a.m.—and were astonished to see that these positions were not defended. Inside the town, the Union officers realized they were surrounded and pleaded with Miles to attempt to recapture Maryland Heights, but he refused, insisting that the force on Bolivar Heights would protect the town. He exclaimed, "I am ordered to hold this place and God damn my soul to hell if I don't." In fact, Jackson's and Miles's forces to the west of town were roughly equal, but Miles was ignoring the threat from the artillery massing to his northeast and south.

Late that night, Miles sent Capt. Charles Russell of the 1st Maryland Cavalry with nine troopers to slip through the enemy lines and take a message to McClellan, or any other general he could find, informing them that the besieged town could hold out only for 48 hours. Otherwise, he would be forced to surrender. Russell's men slipped across South Mountain and reached McClellan's headquarters at Frederick. The general was surprised and dismayed to receive the news. He wrote a message to Miles that a relief force was on the way and told him, "Hold out to the last extremity. If it is possible, re-occupy the Maryland Heights with your whole force." McClellan ordered Maj. Gen. William B. Franklin and his VI Corps to march from Crampton's Gap to relieve Miles. Although three couriers were sent with this information on different routes, none of them reached Harpers Ferry in time.

=== September 14 ===
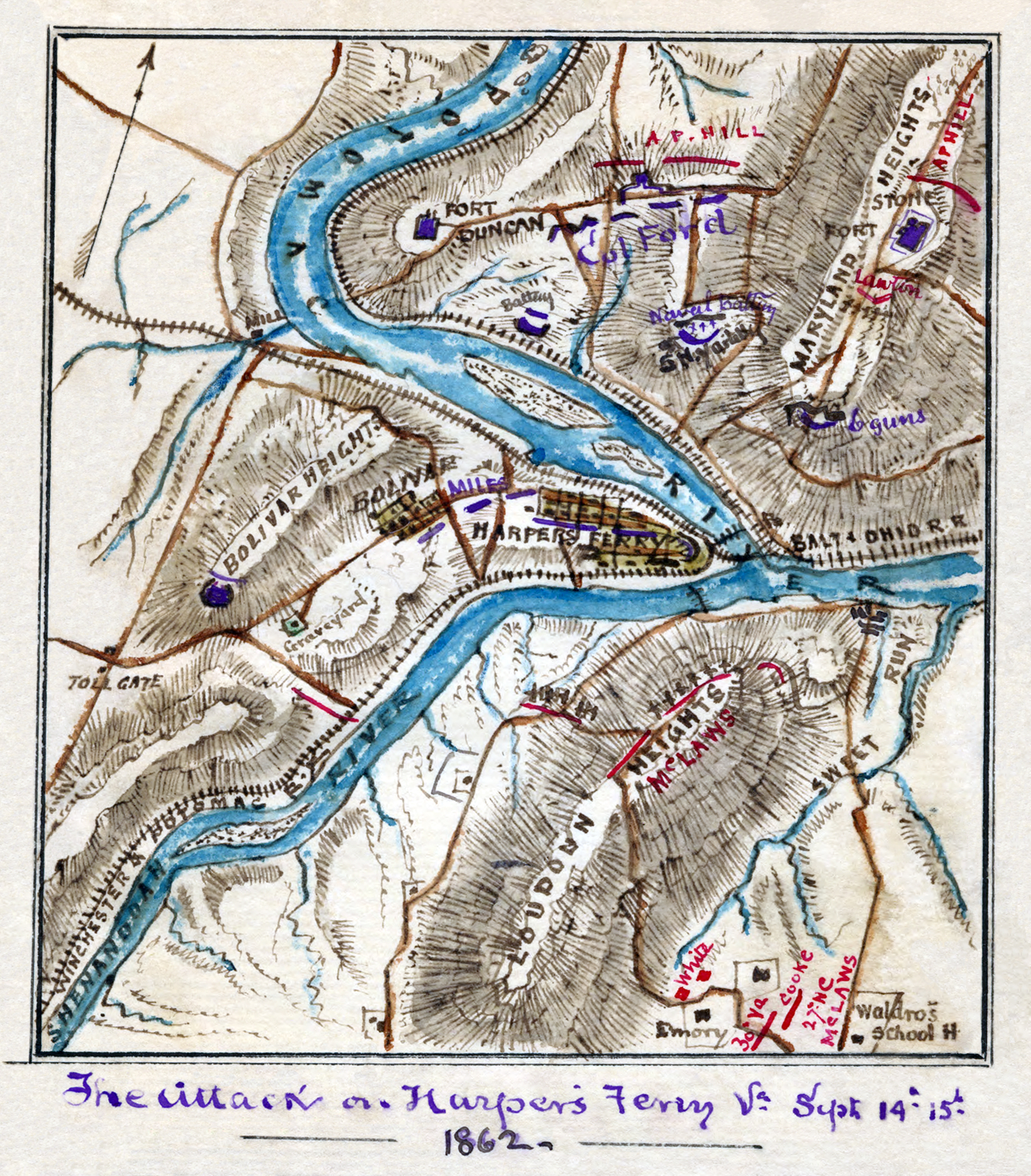
Union military positions near Harpers Ferry in both 1862 and 1864. Restored Civil War period map.

While battles raged at the passes on South Mountain, Jackson had methodically positioned his artillery around Harpers Ferry. This included four Parrott rifles to the summit of Maryland Heights, a task that required 200 men wrestling the ropes of each gun. Although Jackson wanted all of his guns to open fire simultaneously, Walker on Loudoun Heights grew impatient and began an ineffectual bombardment with five guns shortly after 1 p.m. Jackson ordered A.P. Hill to move down the west bank of the Shenandoah in preparation for a flank attack on the Federal left the next morning.

That night, the Union officers realized they had less than 24 hours left, but they made no attempt to recapture Maryland Heights. Unbeknownst to Miles, only a single Confederate regiment now occupied the crest, after McLaws had withdrawn the remainder to meet the Union assault at Crampton's Gap.

Col. Benjamin F. "Grimes" Davis proposed to Miles that his troopers of the 8th New York Cavalry, the Loudoun Rangers, the 12th Illinois Cavalry and some smaller units from Maryland and Rhode Island, attempt to break out. Cavalry forces were essentially useless in the defense of the town. Miles dismissed the idea as "wild and impractical," but Davis was adamant and Miles relented when he saw that the fiery Mississippian intended to break out, with or without permission. Davis and Col. Arno Voss led their 1,400 cavalrymen out of Harpers Ferry on a pontoon bridge across the Potomac, turning left onto a narrow road that wound to the west around the base of Maryland Heights in the north toward Sharpsburg. Despite a number of close calls with returning Confederates from South Mountain, the cavalry column encountered a wagon train approaching from Hagerstown with James Longstreet's reserve supply of ammunition. They were able to trick the wagoneers into following them in another direction and they repulsed the Confederate cavalry escort in the rear of the column, and the southern teamsters found themselves surrounded by Federals in the morning. Capturing more than 40 enemy ordnance wagons, Davis had lost not a single man in combat, the first great cavalry exploit of the war for the Army of the Potomac.

=== September 15 ===
At dawn, McLaws' repositioning of his Confederate troops—8,000 men in two lines across the floor of Pleasant Valley—was revealed to Franklin, who had been tasked by McClellan to "cut off, destroy or capture McLaws' command and relieve Colonel Miles." It was a bluff by McLaws, and it worked because Franklin was convinced that he was outnumbered two-to-one and that it would be "suicidal to attack" the Confederate formation. The deceived Franklin thus halted only six miles from Harpers Ferry; there would be no relief for Miles' garrison.

By the morning of September 15, Jackson had positioned nearly 50 guns on Maryland Heights and at the base of Loudoun Heights, prepared to enfilade the rear of the Federal line on Bolivar Heights. Jackson began a fierce artillery barrage from all sides and ordered an infantry assault for 8 a.m. Miles realized that the situation was hopeless. He had no expectation that relief would arrive from McClellan in time and his artillery ammunition was in short supply. At a council of war with his brigade commanders, he agreed to raise the white flag of surrender. But he would not be personally present at any ceremony. He was confronted by a captain of the 126th New York Infantry, who said, "For ——'s sake, Colonel, don't surrender us. Don't you hear the signal guns? Our forces are near us. Let us cut our way out and join them." But Miles replied, "Impossible. They will blow us out of this place in half an hour." As the captain turned away in disdain, a shell exploded, shattering Miles's left leg. So disgusted were the men of the garrison with Miles's behavior, which some claimed involved being drunk again, it was difficult to find a man who would take him to the hospital. He was mortally wounded and died the next day. Some historians have speculated that Miles was struck deliberately by fire from his own men. With Miles incapacitated, the formal surrender of the garrison to Jackson was undertaken by Brigadier General Julius White—a political general who had commanded the Union forces from the Martinsburg garrison, and who had come to Harper's Ferry with his troops, but, although senior to Miles, had not taken command of the garrison there, deferring instead to the commander on the scene.

== Aftermath ==
Jackson had achieved victory at minor expense. The Confederate Army sustained 286 casualties (39 killed, 247 wounded), mostly from the fighting on Maryland Heights, while the Union Army sustained 12,636 (44 killed, 173 wounded, 12,419 captured). It was the largest surrender of Federal forces during the Civil War, and the largest number of United States troops to surrender until the fall of Bataan in the Philippines during World War II. The Union garrison also surrendered 13,000 small arms, 200 wagons, and 73 artillery pieces. The list of captured artillery pieces included one 50-pounder Parrott rifle (spiked), six M1841 24-pounder howitzers, four 20-pounder Parrott rifles, eight M1841 12-pounder field guns (2 spiked), four 12-pounder Napoleons (2 spiked), six M1841 6-pounder field guns, two 10-pounder Dahlgren guns (spiked), 10 3-inch Ordnance rifles, and six 3-inch James rifles.

Confederate soldiers feasted on Union food supplies and helped themselves to fresh blue Federal uniforms, which would cause some confusion in the coming days. About the only unhappy men in Jackson's force were the cavalrymen, who had hoped to replenish their exhausted mounts, but were not able to because of Col. Grimes Davis' breakout.

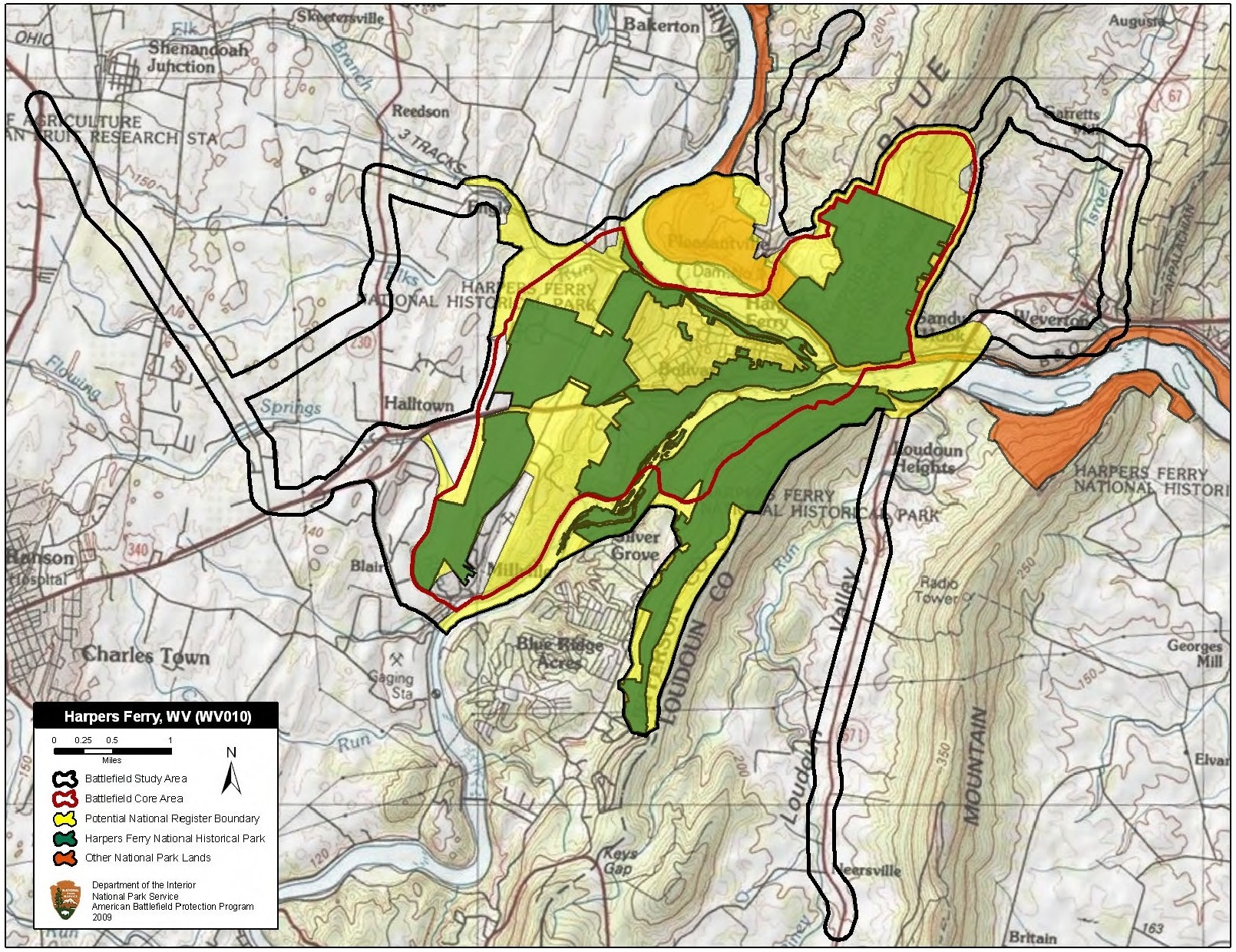
Map of Harpers Ferry Battlefield core and study areas by the American Battlefield Protection Program

Jackson sent off a courier to Lee with the news. "Through God's blessing, Harper's Ferry and its garrison are to be surrendered." As he rode into town to supervise his men, Union prisoners lined the roadside, eager for a look at the famous Stonewall. One of them observed Jackson's dirty, seedy uniform and remarked, "Boys, he isn't much for looks, but if we'd had him we wouldn't have been caught in this trap." By early afternoon, Jackson received an urgent message from General Lee, telling him to get his troops to Sharpsburg as quickly as possible. Jackson left A.P. Hill at Harpers Ferry to manage the parole of Federal prisoners and began marching to join the Battle of Antietam.

== Inquiry ==
The War Department appointed a special commission under Major General David Hunter to determine the reasons for the loss at Harpers Ferry. During 15 days of testimony, resulting in over 900 pages of evidence, the commission focused on Miles' competence and loyalty, his defense of the garrison, the action of his subordinate officers, and missed opportunities for escape and rescue.

The commission found that a primary cause of the defeat lay in the actions of Colonel Thomas H. Ford in his defense of Maryland Heights, which it found to be "without ability". Ford's abandonment of his post was seen to be without sufficient cause, and his general military capacity was determined to be of nature as to disqualify him from further military command. General John E. Wool, who as commander of the Middle Department in Baltimore was Miles' superior until he was placed under McClellan's orders, and who had ordered Miles to defend "at all hazards" the indefensible position, received censure for putting Miles in command at Harpers Ferry. General McClellan also came in for criticism for failing to relieve and protect the garrison.

Finally, although Colonel Miles was dead, and the commission expressed some reluctance to criticize an officer who could not speak on his own behalf, he was nevertheless described as having "incapacity, amounting to almost imbecility [for] the shameful surrender of this important post." The commission opined that if McClellan's forces had been faster to reach Harpers Ferry, or if Miles had managed to hold on without surrendering so quickly, "the enemy would have been forced to raise the siege, or have been taken in detail."

General Henry Halleck—who, as General-in-Chief had refused McClellan's request to attach the Harpers Ferry garrison to the Army of the Potomac, thus denying him an additional 11,000 troops, and leaving Miles in an untenable situation—was not mentioned in the commission's criticism.

== Battlefield preservation ==
The Civil War Trust (a division of the American Battlefield Trust) and its partners have acquired and preserved 542 acres (2.19 km^{2}) of the battlefield in nine acquisitions since 2002, much of which has been incorporated into the Harpers Ferry National Historical Park, which also preserves portions of the battlefield. Additional areas are preserved within the Harpers Ferry Historic District and the National Register of Historic Places listed B & O Railroad Potomac River Crossing.

== See also ==
- Origins of the American Civil War
- List of American Civil War battles
- Maryland Campaign
- Battle of Antietam
- Harpers Ferry National Historical Park
