= Cambrian Genomics =

American biotechnology company

- Industry: Biotechnology
- Founded: San Francisco, United States (2011)
- Founder: Austen Heinz
- Headquarters: San Francisco
- Website: cambriangenomics.com

Cambrian Genomics was a biotechnology company based in San Francisco which used a laser-based technique to synthesize DNA. Cambrian Genomics produced genetic material for a 2013 effort to produce genetically modified glowing plants for sale to the public. A Kickstarter campaign raised $500,000 for the Glowing Plant project.

Cambrian Genomics maintained that it could make any life form by laser printing DNA. It was able to print DNA for companies such as Roche, GlaxoSmithKline, and Thermo Fisher Scientific. The company received investments from investors such as Peter Thiel, Bre Pettis from Makerbot, Bryan Johnson from Braintree, Jeff Hammerbacher from Cloudera, Carl Bass and Jeff Kowalski of Autodesk, Dave Friedberg from Climate Corporation, and VC firms. It later promoted that its customers can design new creatures by modifying the genetic codes of plants and animals using a computer.

In 2014, Cambrian Genomics raised a $10 million round of funding intended for printing DNA for customers in the industrial chemical and agricultural industries.

The company's founder, Austen Heinz, committed suicide at the age of 31 on May 24, 2015.

The company encountered difficulties getting plants to emit significant amounts of light, and announced via email in December 2017 that it had exhausted other money-earning bioluminescence ideas and was ceasing operations.

Cambrian Genomics used commercially available genome sequencers, as well as a sequencer built by Heinz. The sequencer allowed them to recover the underlying DNA rather than destroying it in the sequencing process. The company then used laser-pulse catapulting to eject copies of DNA. Clients could use polymerase chain reaction to copy that new synthetic DNA and insert it into cells.
