= Cumbre (disambiguation) =

Cumbre (plural Cumbres), Spanish for 'Peak' or 'Summit', is an element in various place and other names, most often in the forms La Cumbre or Las Cumbres.

By itself, Cumbre or Cumbres may refer to:

- Cumbre, an insect genus, of skippers in the family Hesperiidae

== Places ==
- Cumbre Nueva, a ridge on La Palma, Canary Islands (a territory of Spain)
- Cumbre Pass, another name of Uspallata Pass AKA Bermejo Pass, a mountain pass in the Andes that connects Santiago and Los Andes, Chile, with Mendoza, Argentina
- Cumbre Vieja, an active volcanic ridge (dormant since 1971) on La Palma, Canary Islands (a territory of Spain)
  - Cumbre Vieja tsunami hazard, an assessed risk of landslide-caused tsunami that could originate from Cumbre Vieja
- Cumbres Institute (Instituto Cumbres) is a group of Catholic, bilingual schools founded 1954 in Mexico, and now also established in Brazil, Chile, Spain, and Venezuela
- Cumbres Pass, a mountain pass in the San Juan Mountains in Colorado, US
  - Cumbres and Toltec Scenic Railroad (C&TSRR), a narrow-gauge heritage railway running from Antonito, Colorado, through the Cumbres Pass and Toltec Gorge, to Chama, New Mexico

== See also ==
- La Cumbre (disambiguation) (also covers Las Cumbres)
- Reunión cumbre, Latin American title of the 1974 jazz album Summit AKA Tango Nuevo by Astor Piazzolla and Gerry Mulligan
