= Cumbrian (1803 ship) =

History

United Kingdom
- Name: Cumbrian
- Namesake: Cumbria
- Owner: 1803: Bruce, Fawcett & Co.; 1826: Bazette & Co.
- Builder: Bombay Dockyard
- Launched: 24 January 1803
- Fate: Sold 1835

General characteristics
- Tons burthen: 705, or 720, or 72025/94, or 750, or 762 (bm)
- Length: 138 ft 0 in (42.1 m)
- Beam: 35 ft 0 in (10.7 m)
- Armament: 10 × 12-pounder guns
- Notes: Teak-built

Cumbrian was launched in 1803 at Bombay, possibly at the Bombay Dockyard. She was a "country ship", generally trading east of the Cape of Good Hope. She also made three voyages for the British East India Company. She was sold in 1835.

== Origin ==
Although most sources agree that the Bombay Dockyard built Cambrian, it is possible that she was built elsewhere in Bombay. Bruce Fawcett found that all the slips at the Bombay Dockyard were engaged. He may, therefore, have turned to another builder, William Stalkart, who had a yard at Colaba.

== Career ==
1st EIC voyage (1803): Cumbrian sailed from Bombay on 8 March 1803, bound for London while under charter to the EIC. She was at Tellicherry on 18 March, the Cape 18 May, St Helena on 17 July, and Bearhaven on 13 September. She arrived at the Downs 3 October.

On 6 February 1804, Cumbrian, Gardner, master, sailed from Portsmouth, bound for India.

2nd EIC voyage (1810): Captain John Tate sailed from Bombay on 3 February 1810, bound for London. Cumbrian was at Point de Galle on 20 February, reached St Helena on 3 May, and arrived at Blackwall on 14 July.

Cumbrian first appeared in Lloyd's Register (LR) in 1810.

| Year | Master | Owner | Trade | Source |
|---|---|---|---|---|
| 1810 | J.Tate | Bruce & Co. | London–India | LR |

On 4 November Cumbrian, Tate, master, sailed from Portsmouth, bound for Bombay. On 16 November she returned to Portsmouth as a consequence of being leaky. On 14 December, while still at Portsmouth Cumbrian lost her fore and main topmast. she arrived back at Bombay on 29 July 1811.

In 1813 the EIC lost its monopoly on the trade between India and Britain. British ships were then free to sail to India or the Indian Ocean under a license from the EIC. Cumbrian was admitted to British registry on 31 March 1814.

| Year | Master | Owner | Trade | Source |
|---|---|---|---|---|
| 1815 | J.Tate; Cooper | Bruce & Co. | London–India | LR |
| 1823 | Cooper; Clarkson | Bruce&Co. Bazett&Co. | London–India | LR |
| 1826 | Clarkson; Blythe | Bazett&Co. | London-Bombay | LR |

3rd EIC voyage (1826–1828): On 2 August 1826 Messrs. Bazett & Co. accepted a charter for Cumbrian from the EIC to convey stores and troops to Bengal. The rate was £4 19s per ton, for 720 tons. Captain James Blyth sailed from Deal on 14 September. Cumbrian reached Madras on 9 January 1827, and arrived at Calcutta on 4 February. The voyage ended on 11 May 1828.

| Year | Master | Owner | Trade | Source & notes |
|---|---|---|---|---|
| 1831 | Blythe | Bazett&Co. | London-Bombay | LR; large repair 1829 |

Between 1828 and 1835 Cumbrian traded to India, the Far East, and the Philippines.

== Fate ==
On 2 September 1835 Cumbrian's register was cancelled. She had been sold to foreign buyers at Manila.
