= La Cumbre, Cáceres =

Coordinates: 39°24′0″N 5°59′0″W

La Cumbre, Spain
- municipality
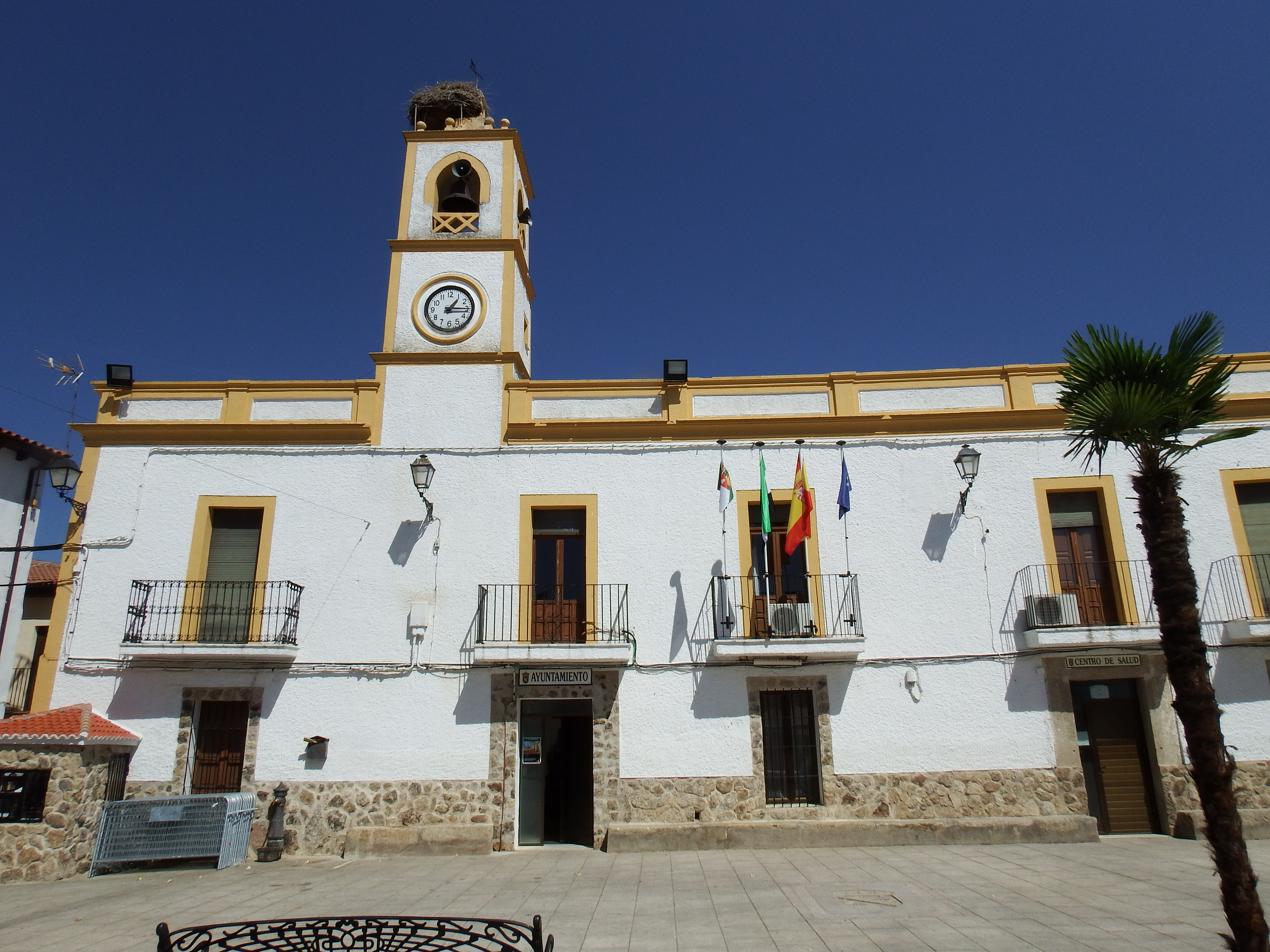
- In front of a monument in La Cumbre, Cáceres

- Flag Coat of arms

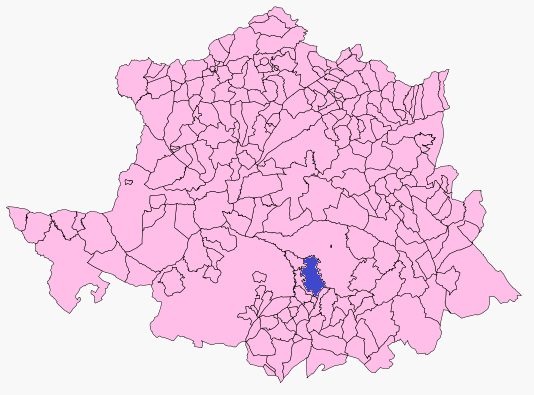
- Map of La Cumbre, Cáceres
- Country: Spain
- Autonomous community: Extremadura
- Province: Cáceres
- Municipality: La Cumbre

Area
  - Total: 113 km^{2} (44 sq mi)
- Elevation: 480 m (1,570 ft)

Population (2025-01-01)
  - Total: 815
  - Density: 7.21/km^{2} (18.7/sq mi)
- Time zone: UTC+1 (CET)
  - Summer (DST): UTC+2 (CEST)

La Cumbre is a municipality located in the province of Cáceres, Extremadura, Spain. According to the 2006 census (INE), the municipality has a population of 1,023.
