= 12th Illinois Cavalry Regiment =

Union Army military unit in the American Civil War

12th Illinois Cavalry
- Illinois flag
- Active: February 24, 1862, to May 29, 1866
- Country: United States
- Allegiance: Union
- Branch: Cavalry
- Engagements: Harpers Ferry; Battle of Gettysburg; Stoneman's 1863 Raid 12th Cav, Co. H and I (McClellan Dragoons); Peninsula Campaign; Seven Days; Battle of Antietam; Fredericksburg

The 12th Illinois Cavalry Regiment was a volunteer cavalry regiment which served in the Union Army during the American Civil War.

== History ==
The 12th Cavalry was organized at Camp Butler in February 1862. It was part of the Army of the Potomac from September 1862 to November 1863; the Department of the Gulf from March 1864 to February 1865; and the Department of Texas from July 1865 to May 1866.

The 4th Illinois Cavalry was consolidated with the 12th Illinois Cavalry on June 14, 1865.

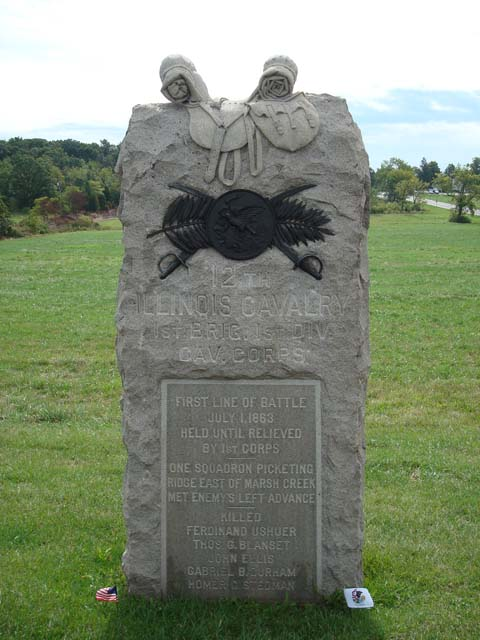
12th Illinois Cavalry

At the Gettysburg Battlefield, the monument to the unit is west of Gettysburg on Reynolds Avenue between the Railroad Cut and Chambersburg Road. It was dedicated in 1891 by the State of Illinois.

== Total strength and casualties ==
The regiment suffered 38 enlisted men who were killed in action or who died of their wounds and 4 officers and 192 enlisted men who died of disease, for a total of 234 fatalities.

== Commanders ==
- Colonel Arno Voss (1861–1864)
- Colonel Hasbrouck Davis (1865)

== See also ==
- List of Illinois Civil War Units
- Illinois in the American Civil War
