= Cymric =

Cymric may refer to:

- Cymric, an adjective meaning 'of or having to do with Wales' (Welsh: Cymru)
  - Welsh culture
  - Welsh language (Welsh: Cymraeg)
- SS Cymric, a steamship launched in 1897 and torpedoed in 1916
- Cymric (schooner), an Arklow schooner, launched in 1893 and lost during World War II in 1944
- Cymric cat, a breed of domestic cat, also known as the Longhair Manx
- Cymric Oil Field, an oil field in California, United States
- Cymric, Saskatchewan, a former community in Canada
- Cymric, a brand name of gold- and silverware by Liberty & Co, equivalent to the pewter Tudric

== See also ==
- Welsh (disambiguation)
- Cambrian (disambiguation), an etymological related word, also referring (in geographical and cultural senses) to Wales
- Cumbrian (disambiguation), an etymological related word, referring to the area north of Wales
- Cumbric, an extinct Brittonic language or dialect of what is now Cumbria, closely related to Welsh
