= Cambrians =

Cambrians Cambrian, Welshman's Gully, Dunstan Creek
- Settlement
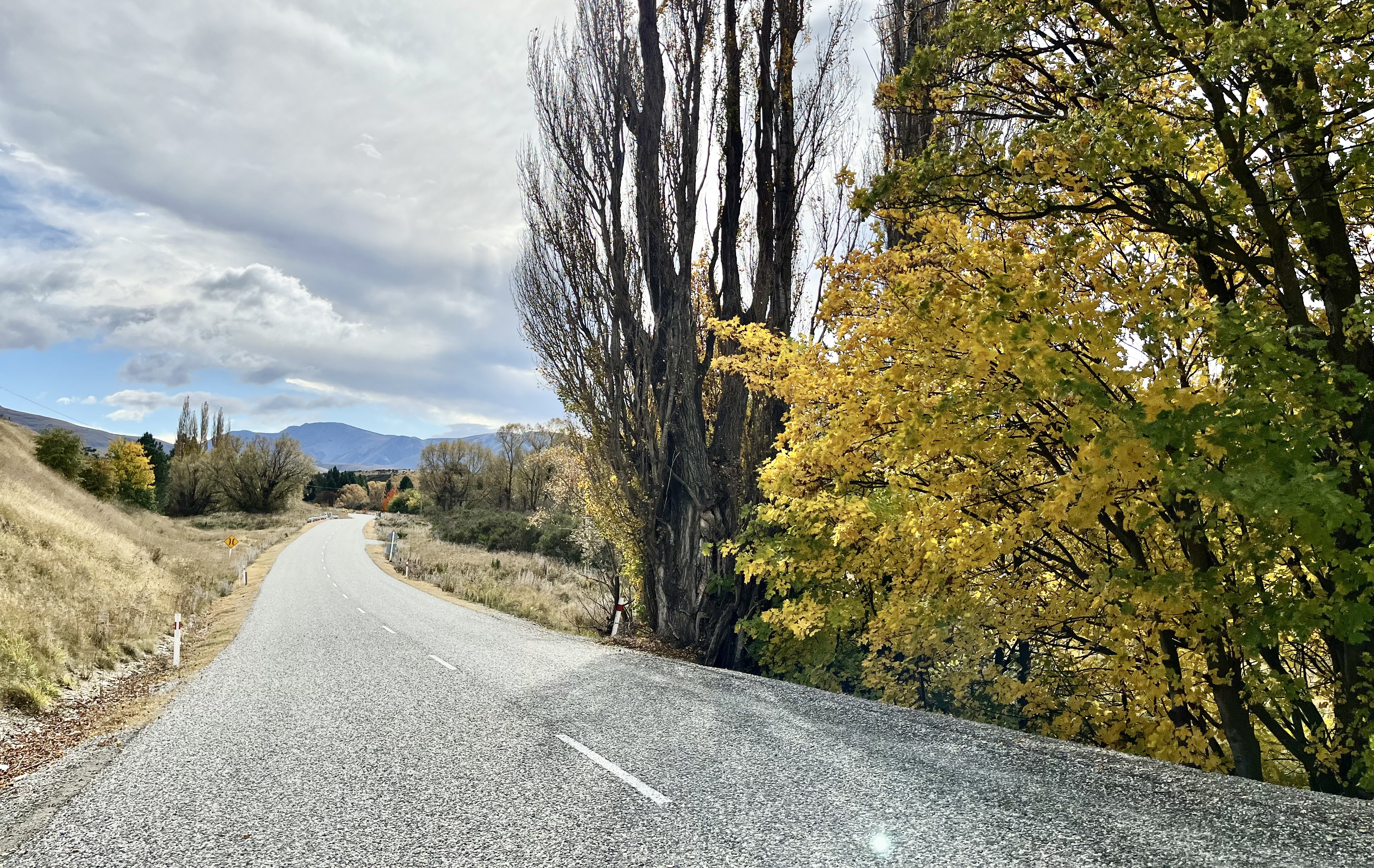
- view of Cambrians
- Etymology: Cambria is the Latin name for Wales
- Cambrians, New Zealand
- Coordinates: 44.909498°S 169.757489°E
- Country: New Zealand
- Region: Otago
- Territorial authority: Central Otago
- Established: 1863

Population
  - Total: <20
- Time zone: UTC+12 (NZST)
  - Summer (DST): UTC+13 (NZDT)
- Local iwi: Ngāi Tahu

Cambrians, or Cambrian, formerly known as Dunstan Creek and Welshman's Gully, is a small rural settlement in the Manuherikia Valley, Central Otago, New Zealand.

Cambrians is located off Loop Road which runs between Becks and St Bathans in the Maniototo region of Central Otago. It is situated 6 kilometres (3.7 mi) southwest of St Bathans and consists of a handful of historic former miners cottages and a few modern residences on Cambrian Road at the foot of the Dunstan Mountains.

== History ==
Although Māori were the first settlers in the Central Otago region (with settlements at Lake Hāwea and Cromwell), there is no recorded habitation at Cambrians.

The earliest European settlers in the region were pastoralists who took up farming leases in the Manuherikia Valley shortly after the topographic surveys of John Turnbull Thomson and Alexander Garvie in late 1857 to early 1858.

=== Dunstan Creek ===
The discovery of gold in Central Otago saw an influx of miners to the region as part of the Otago gold rush in the early 1860s. Purportedly, the first man to the Cambrians area was Thomas (or Robert) Swinney, though the date of his arrival is unknown. A group of five prospectors, led by Mr A. G. Reyman, was mining in a large gully running into Dunstan Creek in late 1861 when they discovered gold and coal nearby. These early workings were known as Dunstan Creek.

=== Welshman's Gully ===
By 1866, the coal (a lignite seam) was described as the best yet discovered in the Province and the returns from gold mining were noted as handsome. The Otago Witness now referred to this prosperous little settlement as Welshman's Gully due to the predominantly Welsh mining populace. The number of Welsh communities in Central Otago were few; of the limited Welsh immigrants who came to New Zealand during the gold rushes, most had settled on the West Coast of the South Island. Welshman's Gully was one of the strongest Welsh communities outside of the West Coast.

=== Cambrians ===
The opening of a post office in 1875 resulted in the Chief-Postmaster deeming it necessary to change the settlement's name due to the presence of another Welshman's Gully near Waikaia (itself known as Switzer's at the time). The settlement's name changed from Welshman's Gully to Cambrian:

The name of Welshman's Gully has been changed to Cambrian – an euphonious name, suggestive of the Welsh origin of the place.

— Mount Ida Chronicle, 5:306, 9 January 1875

It appears around the same point that the use of the name Cambrians caused some consternation:

... changed the name of my Welshman's Gully to Cambrians, which is erroneous, as the ancient name of Wales was Cambria; and Cambrians is neither an adjective nor a noun, and is just as sensible as to call Oamaru Oamaruanians.

— North Otago Times, 26:1843, 23 March 1878

At this point, the miners in Cambrians were reported to be nearly all Welshman who all spoke Welsh, attesting to the close-knit community. In addition to the miners cottages, by now the settlement had stores, a hotel, church, post-office (in one of the stores) and a school. A town hall, Victoria Hall, would follow in the 1880s.

The miners cottages were small and built with materials sourced locally, or easily transported to Cambrians. Many buildings were constructed from sod, mud brick, often with timber framing and corrugated iron cladding.

As the mining declined, many of the buildings and services in Cambrians closed and/or were dismantled including the Welsh Harp Hotel in 1918, Victoria Hall in the 1950s, closely followed by the school in 1954 – although the latter remains as a Manuherikia Valley landmark. Houses were removed and the Welsh community which once thrived had all since gone, apart from several families who had turned to farming in the local area.

Cambrians is now a quiet collection of homes and holiday homes.

== Cambrians Historic Area ==
Cambrians Historic Area is a collection of the miners' residences and inter-related historic places which were entered into Heritage New Zealand's Pouhere Taonga Historic Places list on 4 April 2015 (List Number 3207). The identified historic places that form part of the Cambrians Historic Area are the former residences of the following families:

- McGregor/Dungey
- Gay
- Robert Swinney
- William Swinney
- Haig
- Morgan
- Cambrian School
- Welsh Harp Hotel and residence

The historic residences are mainly located on the south side of Cambrian Road.
