= Cambria Township =

Cambria Township may refer to the following places in the United States:

- Cambria Township, Saline County, Kansas
- Cambria Township, Michigan
- Cambria Township, Minnesota
- Cambria Township, Pennsylvania
- Cambria Township, South Dakota, town including former village of Plana, South Dakota
