= Arno Voss =

American soldier, lawyer, and politician (1821–1888)

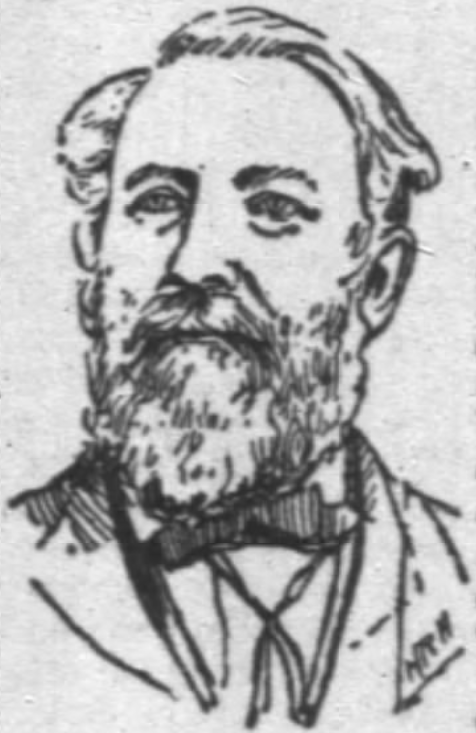
- Born: April 16, 1821; Rahden, Prussia
- Died: March 23, 1888 (aged 66); Chicago, Illinois, U.S.
- Burial place: Waldheim Cemetery; Forest Park, Illinois, U.S.
- Military career
- Allegiance: United States (Union)
- Branch: U.S. Army (Union Army)
- Service years: 1861–1864
- Rank: Colonel
- Unit: 12th Illinois Cavalry
- Conflicts: American Civil War: Battle of Harpers Ferry

Arno Voss (Note: Some sources cite his name as Amos Voss, though there is no contemporary record of this name's use.) (April 16, 1821 – March 23, 1888) was a German American military commander, lawyer, and politician. After studying law in Ohio, Voss came to Chicago, Illinois to edit a newspaper. He later established a law practice there. In 1862, he was named colonel of the 12th Illinois Cavalry, leading the brigade until 1864. After the war, Voss re-opened his practice and served one term in the Illinois House of Representatives.

== Early life and education ==
Voss was born in Rahden, Prussia on April 16, 1821. Voss married in Germany but he and his wife had no children. Early in his adulthood, he immigrated to the United States. He settled in Lancaster, Ohio, where he was admitted to the bar.

== Career ==
Voss moved to Chicago, Illinois in 1848 to take a position as the editor of the Illinois Staats-Zeitung, a German-language newspaper. The next year, Hermann Kriege assumed the editorship and Voss opened a law practice. He became involved with the Chicago German Off Battalion, a citizen soldier group that was attached to the 60th Regiment, Illinois State Militia. Voss was elected Chicago City Attorney in 1852 and was re-elected the next year. In 1854, Voss was named an adjutant of the newly formed Washington Independent Regiment. Voss was still serving in this role upon the outbreak of the Civil War.

On September 4, 1861, Voss was named major of the 6th Regiment Illinois Volunteer Cavalry. On February 1, 1862, he assisted in the creation of the 12th Illinois Cavalry, closing his law firm so that he could focus on the regiment. It was then deployed to Virginia as part of the Peninsula Campaign. The regiment was attached to VIII Corps and was present for the disastrous Battle of Harpers Ferry. Voss took two thousand cavalry to the enemy lines, creating an opening to let the regiment retreat. They regrouped in Greencastle, Pennsylvania and were attached to Army of the Potomac in time for the Battle of Antietam. The regiment also witnessed the Battle of Gettysburg and Stoneman's 1863 Raid. In early 1864, Colonel Voss was forced to resign due to poor health.

== Later life and death ==
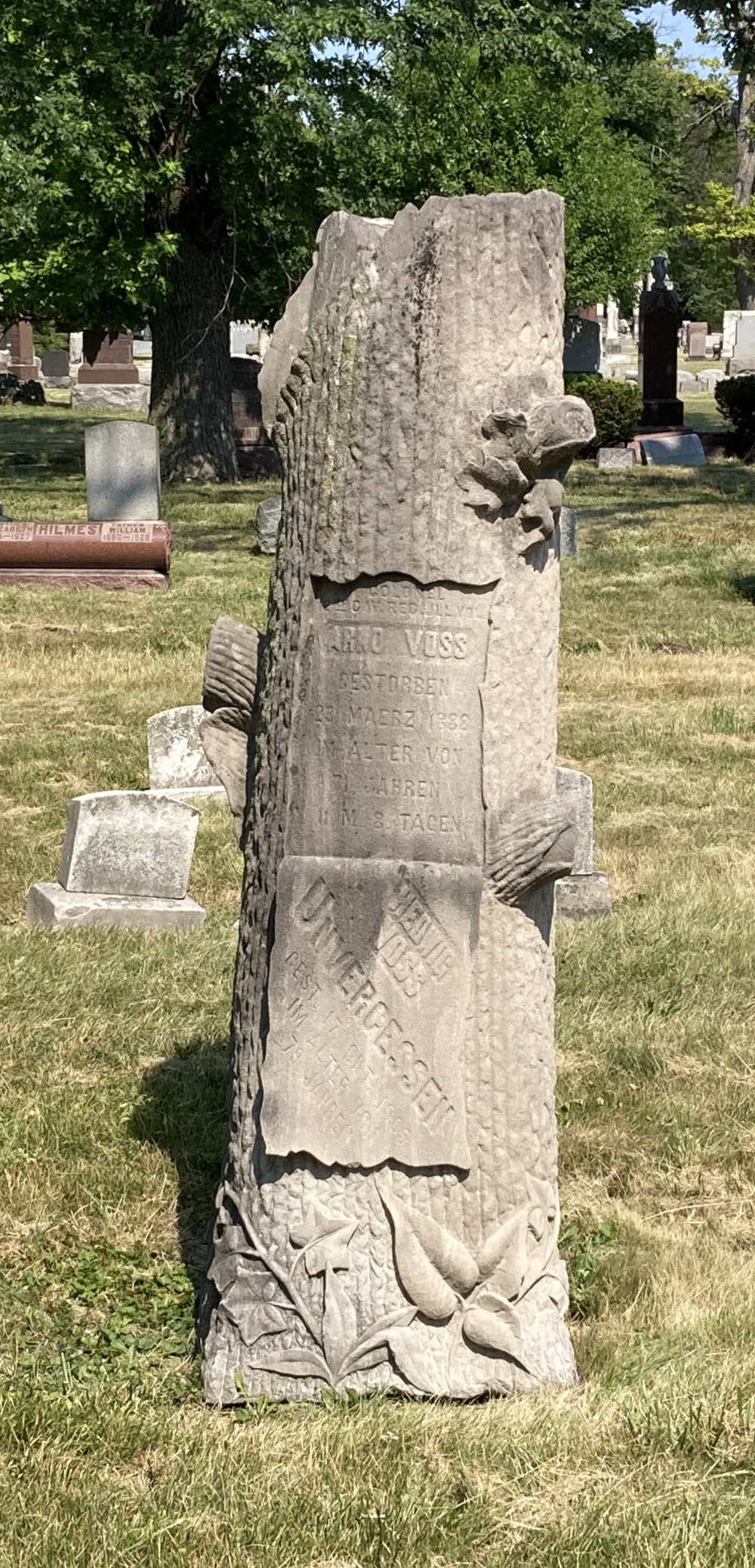
Voss's grave at Forest Home Cemetery

Voss recuperated over the next couple of years on his farm in Will County, Illinois. In 1869, he returned to Chicago to re-establish his law practice. In 1876, he was elected to the Illinois House of Representatives as a Democrat, where he served one two-year term. On December 1, 1880, he was named a master of chancery of the Circuit Court of Cook County. Voss died at his home following a stroke he suffered in his office earlier in the day on March 23, 1888. He was buried in Waldheim Cemetery (now part of Forest Home Cemetery). President Grover Cleveland signed a bill appropriating a grant to Voss' widow over the loss of a trunk during the war.
