= Kampia, Chania =

Village in Crete, Greece

Coordinates: 35.445°N 24.219°E

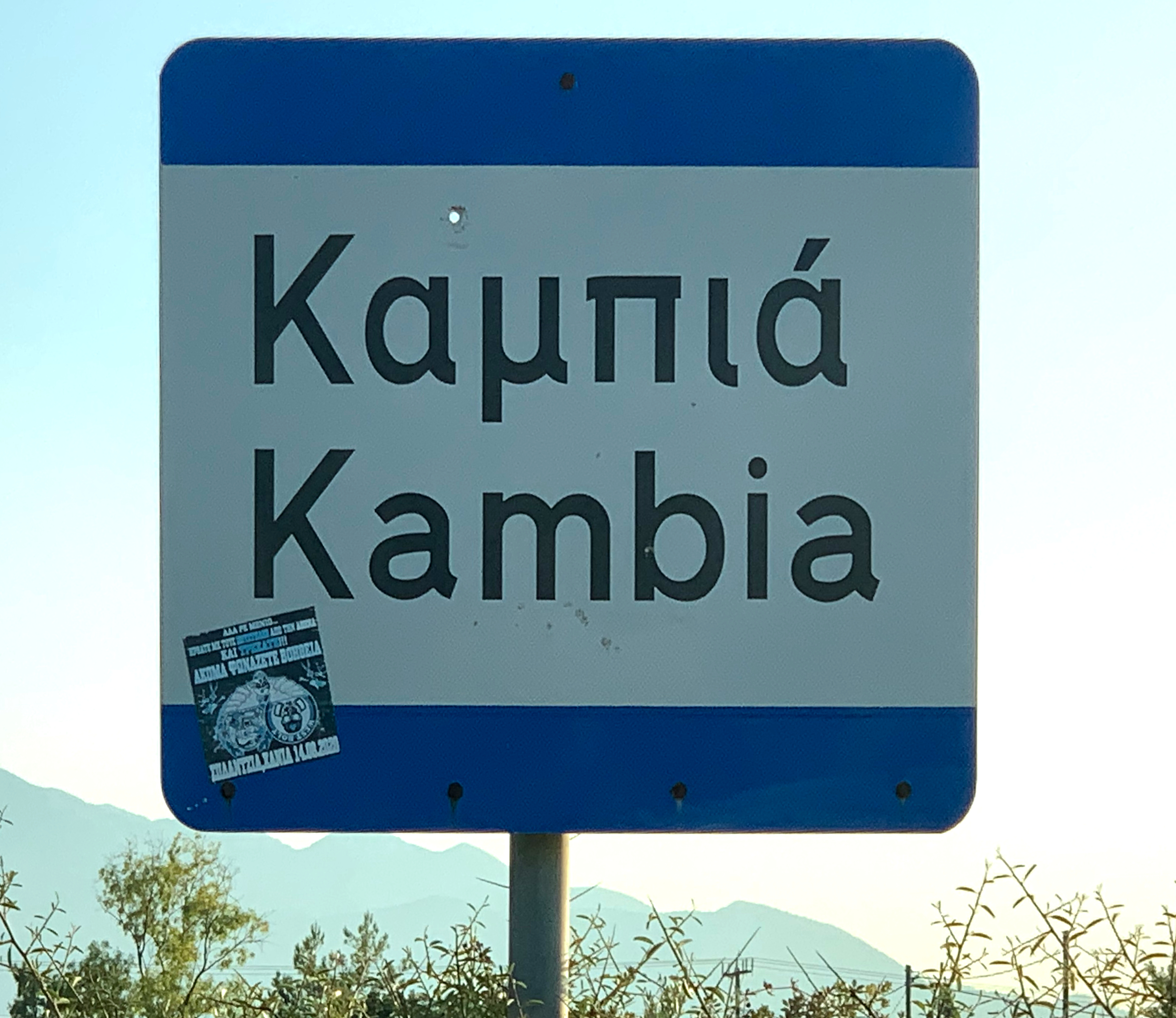
City limit sign

Kampia (Greek: Καμπιά) is a village close to Almirida on the northwest coast of the island of Crete, Greece. It is located in Apokoronas, Chania regional unit.
