= Alexander Garvie =

Pioneering surveyor in New Zealand (1831–1909)

- Born: 1820; United Kingdom
- Died: 24 July 1861 (aged 40–41)
- Spouse: Susan Garvie (née Brown)
- Children: 1
- Engineering career
- Discipline: Carpenter; Surveyor
- Institutions: New Zealand Institute of Surveyors

Alexander L. Garvie (1820 – 24 July 1861), was a British-born pioneer land surveyor in the South Island of New Zealand. Of particular note, the Garvie Mountains in Southland are named for him, and Garvie named The Remarkables, near Queenstown.

== Early life ==
Alexander L. Garvie was born around 1820 in the United Kingdom. Limited detail on his early life exists until his departure for New Zealand aboard the barque Blundell from the port of Gravesend, England, on 4 May 1848.

== New Zealand ==
Garvie arrived in Port Chalmers, New Zealand on 1 September 1848 with his wife, Susan, and two-month-old daughter, Janet. At this point he was 28-years old and initially picked up work as a carpenter and builder.

Garvie then trained as a surveyor under Charles Kettle before becoming Assistant Surveyor under Peter Proudfoot in the Otago Provincial Council. Proudfoot would eventually succeed Kettle as Chief Surveyor in January 1855. In 1856, under Proudfoot’s direction, the preliminary surveys for the development of the Southland District towns of Bluff and Invercargill were made by Garvie. John Turnbull Thomson, Otago Province Chief Surveyor, completed the work due to Proudfoot’s ill health.

=== John Turnbull Thomson expedition ===
In 1857–58, as Assistant Surveyor under John Turnbull Thomson, Garvie helped carry out extensive topographical surveys in Central Otago to delineate the boundaries of the pastoral leases. Garvie commenced the Provincial Triangulation Survey when he laid down the base line on the Taieri Plain. In 1859 he laid out the town of Blue Skin (after Blueskin Bay), which would later be renamed Waitati.

== Death ==
Alexander Garvie died in Kaikorai Valley, Dunedin on 24 July 1861. He was 41. His wife Susan and daughter returned to England with Susan dying in Skinner's Row, Greenwich on 31 August 1864.

== Legacy ==
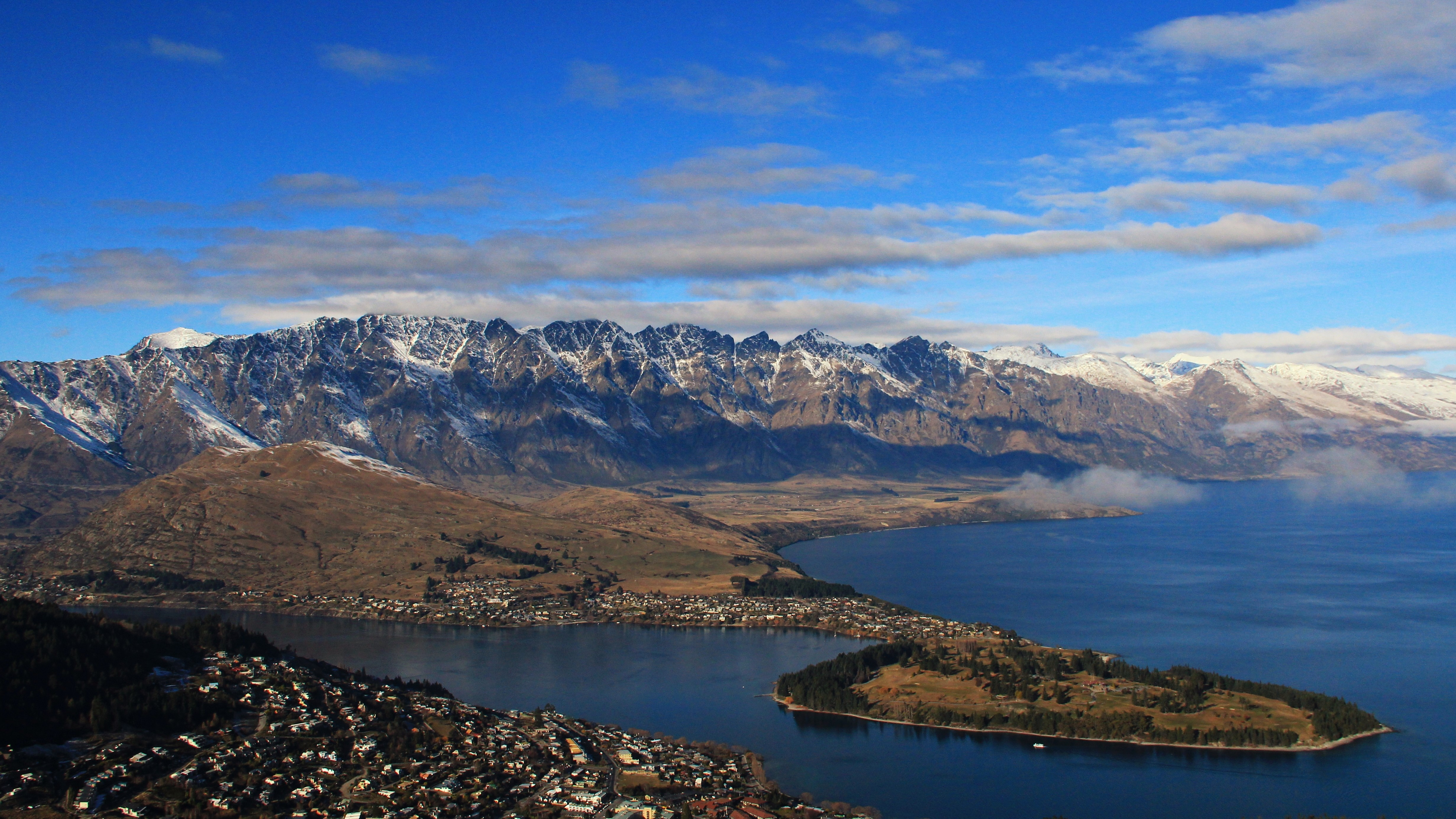
The Remarkables from Queenstown

=== The Remarkables ===
Garvie's greatest enduring legacy, in spite of his rather short career as a surveyor, is his naming of The Remarkables mountain range near Queenstown, Otago. They were named during his exploration of Central Otago with John Thompson in 1857–58.

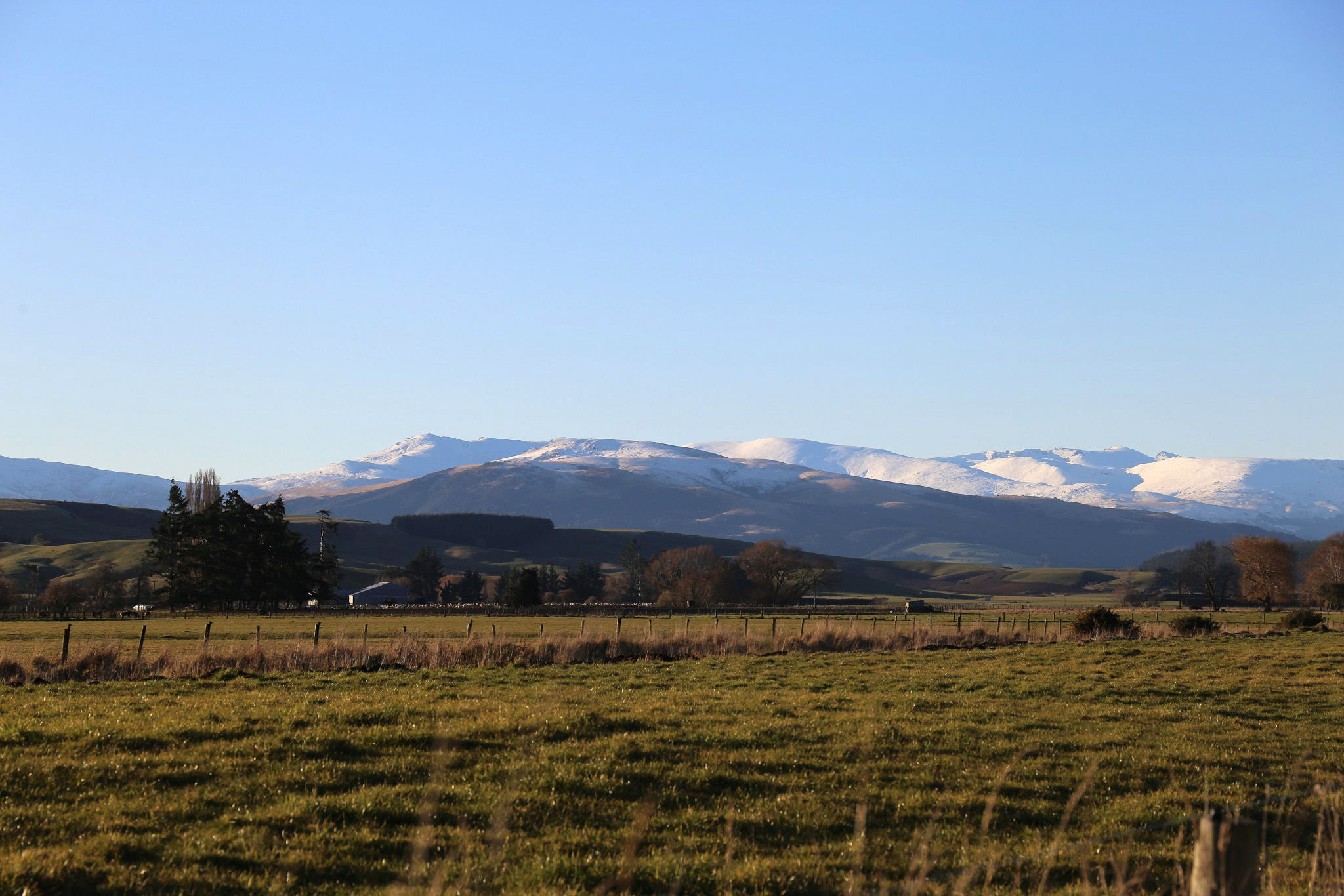
The Garvie Mountains, Southland, New Zealand

=== Garvie Mountains and fauna ===
Both the Garvie Mountains and the Garvie Burn on the southern end of this small mountain range are named after Alexander Garvie. On the same mountain range, a species of Forget me not has been named for Garvie (Myosotis sp. Garvie Bog).

Finally, a rare fern weevil (Megacolobus garviensis) is also named after Garvie. The fern weevil, a large and flightless insect, was a feature of early New Zealand. It has since become rare due to the introduction of rodents and known only from sightings made in 1953 and then again in 1998.
