= 1st Artillery Regiment =

1st Artillery Regiment may refer to:

== Australia ==
- 1st Regiment, Royal Australian Artillery
- 2/1st Field Regiment (Australia)
- 2/1st Anti-Tank Regiment (Australia)
- 2/1st Medium Regiment (Australia)

== Canada ==
- 1st (Halifax-Dartmouth) Field Artillery Regiment
- 1st Regiment, Royal Canadian Horse Artillery
- 1st Medium Regiment, Royal Canadian Artillery

== Italy ==
- 1st Anti-Aircraft Artillery Regiment (Italy)
- 1st Artillery Regiment "Cacciatori delle Alpi"
- 1st Field Artillery Regiment (Mountain)
- 1st Heavy Artillery Regiment (Italy)

== United Kingdom ==
- 1st Regiment Royal Horse Artillery
- 1st Airlanding Light Regiment
- 1st Searchlight Regiment, Royal Artillery
- 1st Aberdeenshire Artillery Volunteers
- Anglesey Artillery Volunteers
- 1st Argyll and Bute Artillery Volunteers
- 1st Ayrshire and Galloway Artillery Volunteers
- 1st Banffshire Artillery Volunteers
- Berwickshire Artillery Volunteers
- 1st Caithness Artillery Volunteers
- 1st Carnarvonshire Artillery Volunteers
- Cheshire Artillery Volunteers
- 1st Cinque Ports Artillery Volunteers
- City of London Artillery
- 1st Cornwall (Duke of Cornwall's) Artillery Volunteers
- Cumberland Artillery
- 1st Devonshire Artillery Volunteers
- 1st Dorsetshire Artillery Volunteers
- 1st Durham Volunteer Artillery
- 1st East Riding Artillery Volunteers
- Edinburgh City Artillery
- 1st Essex Artillery Volunteers
- 1st Fife Artillery Volunteers
- 1st Forfarshire Artillery Volunteers
- 1st Glamorganshire Artillery Volunteers
- Gloucestershire Volunteer Artillery
- 1st Hampshire Artillery Volunteers
- 1st Inverness Artillery Volunteers
- 1st Kent Artillery Volunteers
- 1st Lanarkshire Artillery Volunteers
- 1st Lancashire Artillery Volunteers
- 1st Lincolnshire Artillery Volunteers
- 1st (Hanover Square) Middlesex Artillery Volunteer Corps
- 1st Midlothian Artillery Volunteers
- 1st Monmouthshire Artillery Volunteers
- 1st Newcastle-upon-Tyne Artillery Volunteers
- 1st Norfolk Artillery Volunteers
- 1st North Riding Artillery Volunteers
- 1st Orkney Artillery Volunteers
- 1st Renfrew and Dumbarton Artillery Volunteers
- 1st Staffordshire Artillery Volunteers
- 1st Suffolk Artillery Volunteer Corps
- 1st Suffolk and Harwich Volunteer Artillery
- 1st Sussex Artillery Volunteers
- Tynemouth Volunteer Artillery
- 1st Warwickshire Volunteer Artillery
- 1st Wessex Artillery
- West Riding Artillery
- 1st Worcestershire Artillery Volunteers

== United States ==
- 1st Air Defense Artillery Regiment
- 1st Field Artillery Regiment (United States)
- 1st Continental Artillery Regiment
- 1st Regiment Heavy Artillery U.S. Colored Troops
- 1st Connecticut Heavy Artillery Regiment
- 1st Illinois Light Artillery Regiment
  - Battery A, 1st Illinois Light Artillery Regiment
  - Battery B, 1st Illinois Light Artillery Regiment
  - Battery C, 1st Illinois Light Artillery Regiment
  - Battery D, 1st Illinois Light Artillery Regiment
  - Battery E, 1st Illinois Light Artillery Regiment
  - Battery F, 1st Illinois Light Artillery Regiment
  - Battery G, 1st Illinois Light Artillery Regiment
  - Battery H, 1st Illinois Light Artillery Regiment
  - Battery I, 1st Illinois Light Artillery Regiment
  - Battery K, 1st Illinois Light Artillery Regiment
  - Battery L, 1st Illinois Light Artillery Regiment
  - Battery M, 1st Illinois Light Artillery Regiment
- 1st Indiana Heavy Artillery Regiment
- 1st Maine Heavy Artillery Regiment
- 1st Massachusetts Heavy Artillery Regiment
- 1st Michigan Light Artillery Regiment
  - Battery A, 1st Michigan Light Artillery Regiment
  - Battery B, 1st Michigan Light Artillery Regiment
  - Battery C, 1st Michigan Light Artillery Regiment
  - Battery D, 1st Michigan Light Artillery Regiment
  - Battery E, 1st Michigan Light Artillery Regiment
  - Battery F, 1st Michigan Light Artillery Regiment
  - Battery G, 1st Michigan Light Artillery Regiment
  - Battery H, 1st Michigan Light Artillery Regiment
  - Battery I, 1st Michigan Light Artillery Regiment
  - Battery K, 1st Michigan Light Artillery Regiment
  - Battery L, 1st Michigan Light Artillery Regiment
  - Battery M, 1st Michigan Light Artillery Regiment
- 1st Minnesota Heavy Artillery Regiment
- 1st Mississippi Light Artillery Regiment
- 1st Missouri Light Artillery Regiment
- 1st New Hampshire Heavy Artillery Regiment
- 1st New Jersey Light Artillery Regiment
  - Battery A, 1st New Jersey Light Artillery
  - Battery B, 1st New Jersey Light Artillery
  - Battery C, 1st New Jersey Light Artillery
- 1st New York Light Artillery Regiment
  - Battery B, 1st New York Light Artillery
  - Battery C, 1st New York Light Artillery
  - Battery G, 1st New York Light Artillery
  - Battery I, 1st New York Light Artillery
  - Battery L, 1st New York Light Artillery
  - Battery M, 1st New York Light Artillery
- 1st Ohio Heavy Artillery Regiment
- 1st Ohio Light Artillery Regiment
  - Battery A, 1st Ohio Light Artillery
  - Battery B, 1st Ohio Light Artillery
  - Battery C, 1st Ohio Light Artillery
  - Battery D, 1st Ohio Light Artillery
  - Battery E, 1st Ohio Light Artillery
  - Battery F, 1st Ohio Light Artillery
  - Battery G, 1st Ohio Light Artillery
  - Battery H, 1st Ohio Light Artillery
  - Battery I, 1st Ohio Volunteer Light Artillery
  - Battery K, 1st Ohio Light Artillery
  - Battery L, 1st Ohio Light Artillery
  - Battery M, 1st Ohio Light Artillery
- 1st Pennsylvania Light Artillery Regiment
  - Battery A, 1st Pennsylvania Light Artillery
  - Battery B, 1st Pennsylvania Light Artillery
  - Battery C, 1st Pennsylvania Light Artillery
  - Battery D, 1st Pennsylvania Light Artillery
  - Battery F, 1st Pennsylvania Light Artillery
  - Battery H, 1st Pennsylvania Light Artillery
- 1st Rhode Island Light Artillery Regiment
  - Battery A, 1st Rhode Island Light Artillery Regiment
  - Battery B, 1st Rhode Island Light Artillery Regiment
  - Battery C, 1st Rhode Island Light Artillery Regiment
  - Battery D, 1st Rhode Island Light Artillery Regiment
  - Battery E, 1st Rhode Island Light Artillery Regiment
  - Battery F, 1st Rhode Island Light Artillery Regiment
  - Battery G, 1st Rhode Island Light Artillery Regiment
  - Battery H, 1st Rhode Island Light Artillery Regiment
- Company B, 1st Tennessee Heavy Artillery
- 1st West Virginia Light Artillery Regiment
  - Battery A, 1st West Virginia Light Artillery Regiment
  - Battery B, 1st West Virginia Light Artillery Regiment
  - Battery C, 1st West Virginia Light Artillery Regiment
  - Battery D, 1st West Virginia Light Artillery Regiment
  - Battery E, 1st West Virginia Light Artillery Regiment
  - Battery F, 1st West Virginia Light Artillery Regiment
  - Battery G, 1st West Virginia Light Artillery Regiment
  - Battery H, 1st West Virginia Light Artillery Regiment
- 1st Wisconsin Heavy Artillery Regiment

== Other countries ==
- 1st Field Artillery Regiment (Belgium)
- 1st Artillery Regiment (France)
- 1st Marine Artillery Regiment (France)
- 1 Field Regiment (India)
- 1st Field Regiment, Royal New Zealand Artillery
- 1st Heavy Artillery Regiment (Poland)
- 1st Medium Regiment (South Africa)
- 1st Field Artillery Regiment, King's Guard (Thailand)
