= Battle of Nashville order of battle: Union =

The following Union Army units and commanders fought in the Battle of Nashville of the American Civil War. Order of battle compiled from the army organization during the battle (December 15–16, 1864). The Union force was a conglomerate of units from several different departments provisionally attached to George H. Thomas’ Department of the Cumberland. The IV Corps and the District of Etowah were permanently attached to the Department of the Cumberland while the Cavalry Corps had been attached to the Army of the Cumberland until October 1864 when it was transferred to the Military Division of the Mississippi. The XXIII Corps was detached from the Department of the Ohio and Smith’s Corps (formerly known as the Right Wing-XVI Corps) was detached from the Department of the Tennessee. Other brigades and regiments from the Army of the Tennessee which were unable to rejoin their respective commands were organized into the Provisional Division and attached to the District of the Etowah.

The Confederate order of battle is shown separately.

== Abbreviations used ==
=== Military rank ===
- MG = Major General
- BG = Brigadier General
- Col = Colonel
- Ltc = Lieutenant Colonel
- Maj = Major
- Cpt = Captain
- Lt = Lieutenant

=== Other ===
- w = wounded
- mw= mortally wounded
- k = killed

== Army of the Cumberland ==
MG George H. Thomas, Commanding

Headquarters

- Chief of Staff: BG William D. Whipple

=== IV Corps ===
BG Thomas J. Wood

Division	Brigade	Regiments and others
First Division BG Nathan Kimball	1st Brigade Col Isaac M. Kirby	21st Illinois: Cpt William H. Jamison; 38th Illinois: Cpt Andrew M. Pollard; 31st Indiana: Col John T. Smith; 81st Indiana: Maj Edward G. Mathey; 90th Ohio: Ltc Samuel N. Yeoman; 101st Ohio: Ltc Bedan B. McDonald
First Division BG Nathan Kimball	2nd Brigade BG Walter C. Whitaker	96th Illinois: Maj George Hicks; 115th Illinois: Col Jesse Hale Moore; 35th Indiana: Ltc Augustus G. Tassin; 21st Kentucky: Ltc James C. Evans; 23rd Kentucky: Ltc George W. Northup; 45th Ohio: Ltc John H. Humphrey; 51st Ohio: Ltc Charles H. Wood
First Division BG Nathan Kimball	3rd Brigade BG William Grose	75th Illinois: Col John E. Bennett; 80th Illinois: Cpt James Cunningham; 84th Illinois: Ltc Charles H. Morton; 9th Indiana: Col Isaac C. B. Suman; 30th Indiana: Cpt Henry W. Lawton; 36th Indiana (one company): Lt John P. Swisher; 84th Indiana: Maj John C. Taylor; 77th Pennsylvania: Col Thomas E. Rose
Second Division BG Washington Lafayette Elliott	1st Brigade Col Emerson Opdycke	36th Illinois: Maj Levi P. Holden; 44th Illinois: Cpt Alonzo W. Clark; 74th Illinois: Cpt Wilson Burroughs; 74th-88th Illinois: Ltc George W. Smith; 125th Ohio: Maj Joseph Bruff; 24th Wisconsin: Cpt William Kennedy
Second Division BG Washington Lafayette Elliott	2nd Brigade Col John Q. Lane	100th Illinois: Ltc Charles M.Hammend; 40th Indiana: Ltc Henry Leaming; 57th Indiana: Ltc Willis Blanch (w), Maj John S. McGraw; 28th Kentucky: Maj George W. Barth, Ltc J. Rowan Boone; 26th Ohio: Cpt William Clark; 97th Ohio: Ltc Milton Barnes (w), Cpt Clarkson C. Nichols
Second Division BG Washington Lafayette Elliott	3rd Brigade Col Joseph Conrad	42nd Illinois: Ltc Edgar D. Swain; 51st Illinois: Cpt Albert M. Tilton; 79th Illinois: Col Allen Buckner; 15th Missouri: Cpt George Ernst; 64th Ohio: Ltc Robert Carson Brown; 65th Ohio: Maj Orlow Smith
Third Division BG Samuel Beatty	1st Brigade Col Abel D. Streight	89th Illinois: Ltc William D. Williams; 51st Indiana: Cpt William W. Scearce; 8th Kansas: Ltc John Conover; 15th Ohio: Col Frank Askew (w), Ltc John McClenahan; 49th Ohio: Maj Luther M. Strong (w), Cpt Daniel Hartsough
Third Division BG Samuel Beatty	2nd Brigade Col Philip S. Post (w); Ltc Robert L. Kimberly	59th Illinois: Maj James M. Stookey; 41st Ohio: Ltc Robert L. Kimberly, Cpt Ezra Dunham; 71st Ohio: Ltc James H. Hart (w), Cpt William H. McClure; 93rd Ohio: Ltc Daniel Bowman; 124th Ohio: Ltc James Pickands
Third Division BG Samuel Beatty	3rd Brigade Col Frederick Knefler	79th Indiana: Ltc George W. Parker; 86th Indiana: Col George F. Dick; 13th Ohio (four companies): Maj Joseph T. Snider; 19th Ohio: Ltc Henry G. Stratton
Artillery Maj Wilbur F. Goodspeed		25th Battery, Indiana Light: Cpt Frederick C. Sturm; Battery A, 1st Kentucky Light: Cpt Theodore S. Thomasson; Battery E, 1st Michigan Light: Cpt Peter De Vries; Battery G, 1st Ohio Light: Cpt Alexander Marshall; 6th Battery, Ohio Light: Lt Aaron P. Baldwin; Battery B, Pennsylvania Light: Cpt Jacob Ziegler; Battery M, 4th U.S. Light: Lt Samuel Canby

=== XXIII Corps ===
MG John M. Schofield

Division	Brigade	Regiments and others
Second Division MG Darius N. Couch	1st Brigade BG Joseph A. Cooper	130th Indiana: Col Charles S. Parrish; 26th Kentucky: Col Cicero Maxwell; 25th Michigan: Cpt Samuel L. Demarest; 99th Ohio: Ltc John E. Cummins; 3rd Tennessee: Col William Cross; 6th Tennessee: Ltc Edward Maynard
Second Division MG Darius N. Couch	2nd Brigade Col Orlando H. Moore	107th Illinois: Cpt John W. Wood; 80th Indiana: Ltc Alfred D. Owen; 129th Indiana: Col Charles A. Zollinger; 23rd Michigan: Col Oliver L. Spaulding; 111th Ohio: Ltc Isaac R. Sherwood; 118th Ohio: Maj Edgar Sowers
Second Division MG Darius N. Couch	3rd Brigade Col John Mehringer	91st Indiana: Ltc Charles H. Butterfield; 123rd Indiana: Col John C. McQuiston; 50th Ohio: Ltc Hamilton S. Gillespie; 183rd Ohio: Col George W. Hoge
Third Division BG Jacob D. Cox	1st Brigade Col Charles C. Doolittle	12th Kentucky: Ltc Laurence H. Rousseau; 16th Kentucky: Cpt Jacob Miller; 100th Ohio: Ltc Edwin L. Hayes; 104th Ohio: Col Oscar W. Sterl; 8th Tennessee: Cpt James W. Berry
Third Division BG Jacob D. Cox	2nd Brigade Col John S. Casement	65th Illinois: Ltc W. Scott Stewart; 65th Indiana: Ltc John W. Hammond; 124th Indiana: Col John M. Orr; 103rd Ohio: Cpt Henry S. Pickands; 5th Tennessee: Ltc Nathaniel Witt
Third Division BG Jacob D. Cox	3rd Brigade Col Israel N. Stiles	112th Illinois: Maj Tristram T. Dow; 63rd Indiana: Ltc Daniel Morris; 120th Indiana: Maj John M. Barcus; 128th Indiana: Ltc Jasper Packard
Artillery		15th Battery, Indiana Light: Cpt Alonzo D. Harvey; 19th Battery, Ohio Light: Cpt Frank Wilson; 23rd Battery, Indiana Light: Lt Aaron A. Wilber; Battery D, 1st Ohio Light: Cpt Giles J. Cockerill

=== Detachment, Army of the Tennessee ===
MG Andrew J. Smith

Division	Brigade	Regiments and others
First Division BG John McArthur	1st Brigade Col William L. McMillen	114th Illinois: Cpt John M. Johnson; 93rd Indiana: Col DeWitt C. Thomas, Cpt Charles A. Hubbard; 10th Minnesota: Ltc Samuel P. Jennison (w), Cpt Edwin C. Sanders; 72nd Ohio: Ltc Charles G. Eaton; 95th Ohio: Ltc Jefferson Brumback; Cogswell's Battery Illinois Light Artillery: Lt S. Hamilton McClaury
First Division BG John McArthur	2nd Brigade Col Lucius F. Hubbard	5th Minnesota: Ltc William B. Gere; 9th Minnesota: Col Josiah F. Marsh; 11th Missouri: Ltc Eli Bowyer (w), Maj Modesta J. Green; 8th Wisconsin: Ltc William B. Britton; 2nd Battery, Iowa Light Artillery: Cpt Joseph R. Reed
First Division BG John McArthur	3rd Brigade Col Sylvester G. Hill (k); Col William R. Marshall	12th Iowa: Ltc John H. Stibbs; 35th Iowa: Maj William Dill, Cpt Abraham N. Snyder; 7th Minnesota: Col William R. Marshall, Ltc George Bradley; 33rd Missouri: Ltc William H. Heath; Battery I, 2nd Missouri Light Artillery: Cpt Stephen H. Julian
Second Division BG Kenner Garrard	1st Brigade Col David Moore	119th Illinois: Col Thomas J. Kinney; 122nd Illinois: Ltc James F. Drish; 89th Indiana: Ltc Hervey Craven; 21st Missouri: Ltc Edwin Moore; 9th Battery, Indiana Light Artillery: Lt Samuel G. Calfee
Second Division BG Kenner Garrard	2nd Brigade Col James I. Gilbert	58th Illinois: Maj Robert W. Healy; 27th Iowa: Ltc Jed Lake; 32nd Iowa: Ltc Gustavus A. Eberhart; 10th Kansas (four companies): Cpt William C. Jones; 3rd Battery, Indiana Light Artillery: Lt Thomas J. Ginn
Second Division BG Kenner Garrard	3rd Brigade Col Edward H. Wolfe	49th Illinois: Col Phineas Pease; 117th Illinois: Ltc Jonathan Merriam; 52nd Indiana: Ltc Zalmon S. Main; 178th New York: Cpt John B. Gandolfo; Battery G, 2nd Illinois Light Artillery: Cpt John W. Lowell
Third Division Col Jonathan B. Moore	1st Brigade Col Lyman M. Ward	72nd Illinois: Cpt James A. Sexton; 40th Missouri: Col Samuel A. Holmes; 14th Wisconsin: Maj Eddy F. Ferris; 33rd Wisconsin: Ltc Frederick S. Lovell
Third Division Col Jonathan B. Moore	2nd Brigade Col Leander Blanden	81st Illinois: Ltc Andrew W. Rogers; 95th Illinois: Ltc William Avery; 44th Missouri: Ltc Andrew J. Barr
Artillery		14th Battery, Indiana Light: Cpt Francis W. Morse; Battery A, 2nd Missouri Light: Lt John Zepp

=== Provisional Detachment (District of the Etowah) ===
MG James B. Steedman

Division	Brigade	Regiments and others
Provisional Division BG Charles Cruft	1st Brigade Col Benjamin Harrison	3 battalions detached from the XX Corps
Provisional Division BG Charles Cruft	2nd Brigade [Army of the Tennessee] Col Adam Gale Malloy	Consisted of men on detached duty from the XVII Corps
Provisional Division BG Charles Cruft	2nd Brigade Col John G. Mitchell	Consisted of men on detached duty from the XIV Corps
Provisional Division BG Charles Cruft	3rd Brigade Ltc Charles H. Grosvenor	68th Indiana: Ltc Harvey J. Espy; 18th Ohio: Cpt Ebenezer Grosvenor (k), Cpt John M. Benedict (w), Lt Charles Grant; 2nd Battalion, XIV Army Corps, Cpt D. H. Henderson (w)
Provisional Division BG Charles Cruft	Artillery	20th Battery, Indiana Light: Cpt Milton A. Osborne; 18th Ohio Battery: Cpt Charles C. Aleshire
U.S.C.T.	1st Colored Brigade Col Thomas J. Morgan	14th U.S. Colored Troops: Ltc Henry C. Corbin; 16th U.S. Colored Troops: Col William B. Gaw; 17th U.S. Colored Troops: Col William R. Shafter; 18th U.S. Colored Troops (battalion): Maj Lewis D. Joy; 44th U.S. Colored Troops (battalion): Col Lewis Johnson
U.S.C.T.	2nd Colored Brigade Col Charles R. Thompson	12th U S. Colored Troops: Ltc William R. Sellon, Cpt Henry Hegner; 13th U.S. Colored Troops: Col John A. Hottenstein; 100th U.S. Colored Troops: Maj Collin Ford; 1st Battery, Kansas Light Artillery: Cpt Marcus D. Tenney
Post of Nashville BG John F. Miller	2nd Brigade, Fourth Division, XX Corps Col Edwin C. Mason	142nd Indiana: Col John M. Comparet; 45th New York: Ltc Adolphus Dobke; 176th Ohio: Ltc William B. Nesbitt; 179th Ohio: Col Harley H. Sage; 182nd Ohio: Col Lewis Butler
Post of Nashville BG John F. Miller	Unattached	3rd Kentucky (part); 28th Michigan: Col William W. Wheeler; 173rd Ohio: Col John R. Hurd; 78th Pennsylvania (detachment): Maj Henry W. Torbett; Veteran Reserve Corps: Col Frank P. Cahill; 44th Wisconsin (battalion): Ltc Oliver C. Bissell; 45th Wisconsin (battalion): --
Post of Nashville BG John F. Miller	Garrison Artillery Maj John J. Ely	Bridges' Battery, Illinois Light: Lt Lyman A. White; 2nd Battery, Indiana Light: Cpt James S. Whicher; 4th Battery, Indiana Light: Cpt Benjamin F. Johnson; 12th Battery, Indiana Light: Cpt James E. White; 21st Battery, Indiana Light: Cpt Abram Piatt Andrew; 22nd Battery, Indiana Light: Cpt Edward W. Nicholson; 24th Battery, Indiana Light: Lt Hiram Allen; Battery F, 1st Michigan Light: Cpt Byron D. Paddock; Battery A, 1st Ohio Light: Lt Charles W. Scovill; Battery E, 1st Ohio Light: Lt Frank B. Reckard; 20th Battery, Ohio Light: Cpt William Backus; Battery C, 1st Tennessee Light: Lt Joseph Grigsby; Battery D, 1st Tennessee Light: Cpt Samuel D. Leinart; Battery A, 2nd U.S. Colored Light: Cpt Josiah V. Meigs
Post of Nashville BG John F. Miller	Quartermaster's Division BG James L. Donaldson	Composed of quartermaster's employees

=== Cavalry Corps ===
MG James H. Wilson

Escort:

- 4th United States: Lt. Joseph Hedges

Division	Brigade	Regiments and others
1st Division	1st Brigade BG John T. Croxton	8th Iowa: Col Joseph B. Dorr; 4th Kentucky Mounted Infantry: Col Robert M. Kelly; 2nd Michigan: Ltc Benjamin Smith; 1st Tennessee: Ltc Calvin M. Dyer; Chicago Board of Trade Battery, Illinois Light Artillery: Cpt George I. Robinson
1st Division	2nd and 3rd Brigades under BG E. M. McCook in western Kentucky	
5th Division BG Edward Hatch	1st Brigade Col Robert R. Stewart	3rd Illinois: Ltc Robert H. Carnahan; 11th Indiana: Ltc Abram Sharra; 12th Missouri: Col Oliver Wells; 10th Tennessee: Maj William P. Story (mw), Maj James T. Abernathy
5th Division BG Edward Hatch	2nd Brigade Col Datus E. Coon	6th Illinois: Ltc John Lynch; 7th Illinois: Maj John M. Graham; 9th Illinois: Cpt Joseph W. Harper; 2nd Iowa: Maj Charles C. Horton; 12th Tennessee Cavalry: Col George Spalding (w); Battery I, 1st Illinois Light Artillery: Lt Joseph A. McCartney
6th Division BG Richard W. Johnson	1st Brigade Col Thomas J. Harrison	16th Illinois: Maj Charles H. Beeres; 5th Iowa: Ltc Harlon Baird; 7th Ohio: Col Israel Garrard
6th Division BG Richard W. Johnson	2nd Brigade Col James Biddle	14th Illinois: Maj Haviland Tompkins; 6th Indiana: Maj Jacob S. Stephens; 8th Michigan: Col Elisha Mix; 3rd Tennessee: Maj Benjamin Cunningham
6th Division BG Richard W. Johnson	Artillery	Battery I, 4th United States: Lt Frank G. Smith
7th Division BG Joseph F. Knipe	1st Brigade BG John H. Hammond	9th Indiana: Col George W. Jackson; 10th Indiana: Ltc Benjamin Q. A. Gresham; 19th Pennsylvania: Ltc Joseph C. Hess; 2nd Tennessee: Ltc William R. Cook; 4th Tennessee: Ltc Jacob M. Thornburgh
7th Division BG Joseph F. Knipe	2nd Brigade Col Gilbert M. L. Johnson	12th Indiana: Col Edward Anderson; 13th Indiana: Ltc William T. Pepper; 6th Tennessee: Col Fielding Hurst
7th Division BG Joseph F. Knipe	Artillery	14th Battery, Ohio Light: Lt William C. Myers

== Mississippi River Squadron ==
=== 10th District ===
Lt. Commander LeRoy Fitch

Class	Vessel
River monitor	U.S.S. Neosho Lieutenant Samuel Howard
Ironclad	U.S.S. Carondelet Acting Master Charles W. Miller
Tinclad	U.S.S. Silver Lake Acting Master Joseph C. Coyle
Tinclad	U.S.S. Brilliant Lieutenant Charles Perking; Acting Master John H. Rice
Tinclad	U.S.S. Reindeer Lieutenant Henry A. Glassford
Tinclad	U.S.S. Moose Lieutenant Commander LeRoy Fitch
Tinclad	U.S.S. Fairplay Acting Master George J. Groves
Tinclad	U.S.S. Springfield Acting Master Edmond Morgan
