= Minor Michigan infantry units in the American Civil War =

Minor Michigan Infantry Units of the American Civil War

Michigan state flag

The State of Michigan raised a pair of company-sized infantry units for the American Civil War.

== Stanton Guard, Michigan Volunteer Infantry ==
The Stanton Guard was organized at Detroit, Michigan in April 1862 by Captain Grover S. Wormer and mustered in on May 10, to serve as guards over General William Giles Harding, Washington Barrow and Judge Josephus Conn Guild, three Confederate sympathizers from Nashville, TN sent as prisoners to the fort on Mackinac Island. Upon the removal of the prisoners, it was mustered out of service on September 25, 1862. Captain Wormer afterward served as lieutenant colonel in the 8th Michigan Cavalry and colonel in the 30th Michigan Infantry.

== Independent Company, Michigan Volunteer Infantry (Provost Guard) ==
The Independent Company was organized at Detroit, Michigan and mustered in on January 3, 1863. The unit served as Provost Guard at the Detroit Barracks until it was mustered out of service on May 9, 1865.

== See also ==
- List of Michigan Civil War Units
- Michigan in the American Civil War
