= 10th Michigan Cavalry Regiment =

- Active: September 18, 1863 – November 11, 1865
- Disbanded: November 11, 1865
- Country: United States
- Allegiance: Union
- Branch: Cavalry
- Size: Regiment
- Engagements: American Civil War

The 10th Michigan Cavalry Regiment was a cavalry regiment that served in the Union Army during the American Civil War.

== Service ==
The 10th Michigan Cavalry was organized at Grand Rapids, Michigan between September 18 and November 23, 1863. The regiment left Grand Rapids for Lexington, Kentucky, on December 1, 1863. The regiment moved to Knoxville, Tennessee, on February 25 and remained there until March 6. The regiment saw action at Flat Creek Valley on March 15 then moved to Morristown on March 16.

In April 1864, expeditions were made to Carter's Station from April 24–28, to Rheatown on April 24, to Jonesboro and Johnsonville on April 25, from Bull's Gap to Watauga River April 25–27. Watauga Bridge April 25. Powder Springs Gap April 29. In May, expeditions were made to Newport on May 2 and Dandridge May 19. A reconnaissance from Strawberry Plains to Bull's Gap and Greenville was accomplished from May 28–31. In the summer of 1864, a reconnaissance was made to Bean's Station June 14, Wilsonville June 16, and a scout from Strawberry Plains to Greenville August 1–5.

The regiment participated in Gillem's Expedition into East Tennessee August 17–31 with the exception of Companies E, F and I that remained in Knoxville.

The regiment took part in General Stoneman's 1865 raid into North Carolina and Virginia.

The regiment was mustered out of service on November 11, 1865.

== Total strength and casualties ==
The regiment suffered 2 officers and 29 enlisted men killed in action or mortally wounded and 240 enlisted men who died of disease, for a total of 271 fatalities.

== Commanders ==
- Colonel Luther Stephen Trowbridge

== See also ==
- List of Michigan Civil War Units
- Michigan in the American Civil War
