= Foreign Enlistment Act 1870 =

Act of the Parliament of the United Kingdom

Foreign Enlistment Act 1870 (Note: Section 1.)
- Act of Parliament
- Parliament of the United Kingdom
- Long title: An Act to regulate the conduct of Her Majesty's Subjects during the existence of hostilities between foreign states with which Her Majesty is at peace.
- Citation: 33 & 34 Vict. c. 90
- Territorial extent: All dominions of Her Majesty (Note: Section 2.)

Dates
- Royal assent: 9 August 1870
- Commencement: United Kingdom: 9 August 1870 (Note: Section 3.)
Other legislation
Repeals/revokes	Foreign Enlistment Act 1819
Amended by	Statute Law Revision Act 1883; Statute Law Revision (No. 2) Act 1893; Board of Customs and Excise Order 1909; Government of India (Adaptation of Acts of Parliament) Order 1937; Criminal Justice Act 1948; Statute Law Revision Act 1953; Defence (Transfer of Functions) (No. 1) Order 1964; Northern Ireland (Modification of Enactments—No. 1) Order 1973; Criminal Procedure (Scotland) Act 1975; Statute Law (Repeals) Act 1976; Statute Law Revision (Northern Ireland) Act 1976; Isle of Man (Transfer of Functions) Order 1980; Telecommunications Act 1984; Statute Law (Repeals) Act 1995; Statute Law (Repeals) Act 2008
Relates to	Customs Act 1826

Status: Amended

Text of statute as originally enacted

Revised text of statute as amended

Text of the Foreign Enlistment Act 1870 as in force today (including any amendments) within the United Kingdom, from legislation.gov.uk.

The Foreign Enlistment Act 1870 (33 & 34 Vict. c. 90) is an act of the Parliament of the United Kingdom that seeks to regulate mercenary activities of British citizens.

It received royal assent on 9 August 1870.

== Background ==
Foreign Enlistment Act 1819
- Act of Parliament
- Parliament of the United Kingdom
- Long title: An Act to Prevent the Enlisting or Engagement of His Majesty’s Subjects to Serve in Foreign Service, and the Fitting out or Equipping, in his Majesty's Dominions, Vessels for Warlike Purposes Without His Majesty's Licence.
- Citation: 59 Geo. 3. c. 69
- Territorial extent: United Kingdom

Dates
- Royal assent: 3 July 1819
- Commencement: 3 July 1819 (Note: Section 1.)
- Repealed: 9 August 1870
Other legislation
Repeals/revokes	Foreign Enlistment Act 1735; Foreign Service Enlistment Act 1737; Foreign Service and Foreign Education Act 1745; Foreign Enlistment Act 1756
Repealed by	Foreign Enlistment Act 1870

Status: Repealed

Text of statute as originally enacted

There was no common law prohibition on enlistment in foreign militaries, and mercenary services predated the development of professional armies. The Foreign Enlistment Act 1819 (59 Geo. 3. c. 69) (long title "An Act to Prevent the Enlisting or Engagement of His Majesty’s Subjects to Serve in Foreign Service, and the Fitting out or Equipping, in his Majesty's Dominions, Vessels for Warlike Purposes Without His Majesty's Licence") was passed by on 3 July 1819. The law was passed to uphold British neutrality in the Spanish American wars of independence and made it a crime punishable by fines and imprisonment for British subjects to serve in foreign militaries. The 1819 act was rarely enforced. In 1833 MP John Murray proposed repeal, saying "There never was an Act of the Legislature so little under the general opinions of the country." That repeal effort failed, but the law remained ineffective.

On 9 August 1870, in response to the Franco-Prussian War, Parliament repealed the 1819 act and passed the 1870 act, a redrafting of the prior legislation. The 1870 act, enacted during the British Empire era, implemented many recommendations of a royal commission convened after the American Civil War. It clarified the scope of prohibited military activity (including making clear that the act only applied to "any foreign state at war with any foreign state at peace with Her Majesty" rather than all peacetime military service, to which the 1819 act extended); limited prison sentences for violations to two years; and made it a crime to prepare for or conduct military expeditions, to aid or abet any violators of the act, or to induce a person's enlistment by misrepresentations. The 1870 act thus applied to wars between states in which Britain was neutral; during the Russo-Turkish War (1877–78), Sino-Japanese War (1894–95), and Russo-Japanese War (1904–05), British officials blocked naval vessels from sailing to belligerents.

Stephen presents late 19th century establishment views. Lorimer publishes the law of 1870 as it was originally enacted.

== Prosecutions and non-prosecutions under the 1819 and 1870 acts ==
Authorities in Britain generally did not enforce the act, and it was often ignored, both in Britain and in British North America (to which the act applied), except in rare situations in which the foreign military activity threatened British neutrality in armed conflicts. More than 5,000 Britons served with Simón Bolívar in the Albion Legion and other units during the Spanish American wars of independence. The 300 Britons who participated in the 1832 military campaign of Dom Pedro of Brazil against Portugal were also not prosecuted. Nor was any action taken against the Irish and Quebec Catholics (British subjects) who fought on behalf of the Papal States (as Zouaves) in the late 1860s, during the Italian Risorgimento.

Britain was neutral in the American Civil War, yet more than 50,000 British North Americans (many Canadians) fought for the Union during the war, and a much smaller number for the Confederacy. There were only a handful of prosecutions. In the small number of prosecutions, the Canadian courts rejected all jurisdiction challenges raised by the accused, concluding that the imperial act applied in British North America. The highest-profile case was that of Colonel Arthur Rankin, a militia officer of the Legislative Assembly of the Province of Canada who in the summer of 1861 personally offered his services to Abraham Lincoln, accepted a Union commission and raised the First Michigan Lancers. Rankin was prosecuted in October 1861; the court rejected Rankin's arguments on jurisdiction, dropped the charge of "recruiting" and referred the charge of enlistment to the Court of Queen's Bench; ultimately, the prosecution was dropped. Rankin denounced the Foreign Enlistment Act as a violation of the rights he and other "Canadian gentlemen not only willing but eager to" fight for the Union as part of their "perfect right to enrol themselves in the cause of freedom – that of the North against the South".

Parliament formally suspended the law on one occasion – in 1835, during the First Carlist War, for two years, permitting British subjects to join the army of Queen Isabella II of Spain.

The last successful prosecution occurred in 1896 in the trial of Sir Leander Starr Jameson, who was convicted for leading the Jameson Raid, a raid from the Cape Colony into the South African Republic (Transvaal) in rebellion against the Boer government there. Problems with evidence prevented the British government from convicting enlistees to the French Foreign Legion or those thousands who joined the fight against Francisco Franco in the Spanish Civil War.

In 1975 the National Liberation Front of Angola advertised for recruits in the British press, prompting the Wilson ministry to get the Privy Council to appoint a committee (Lord Diplock, Derek Walker-Smith and Geoffrey De Freitas) to "Inquire into the Recruitment of Mercenaries". Its terms of reference included "possible amendment of the Foreign Enlistment Act", which the August 1976 "Diplock Report" described as "antiquated".

In 2017, a British man who had joined the Russian separatist forces in Ukraine was convicted under terrorism laws, receiving a jail sentence of five years and four months.

Interviewed after the 2022 Russian invasion of Ukraine, Foreign Secretary Liz Truss said she would "absolutely" support Britons volunteering to fight for Ukraine, however soon after the Minister of Defence Ben Wallace effectively contradicted that view. This suggestion caused mixed reactions. Former Attorney General for England and Wales Dominic Grieve, a former member of Truss's Conservative Party, said that Britons who fought in Ukraine would be violating the 1870 act. By contrast, Sir Bob Neill, the chair of the House of Commons' Justice Select Committee, called the Foreign Enlistment Act 1870 an "antiquated piece of legislation" that should not be enforced.

In April 2024, a government minister stated that dual nationals were permitted to serve in the military forces of their additional nationality, including the Israel Defence Force engaged in the Gaza war. He also noted that section 4 of the act does not extend to "enlistment in a foreign government's forces which are engaged in a civil war or combating terrorism or internal uprisings."

In 2026, Westminster Magistrates' Court rejected an attempt by the International Centre of Justice for Palestinians to prosecute a dual British-Israeli national for his service in the Gaza war. District Judge Paul Goldspring held that the Foreign Enlistment Act only applied to actual enlistment in a foreign military, whereas the soldier involved in the case was already enlisted prior to the outbreak of war and had "merely reported for reserve duty pursuant to his existing liability under Israeli law". Additionally, Goldspring confirmed the Act does not apply to dual nationals serving in the militaries of their country of nationality.

== Outside the United Kingdom ==
The Westminster Act initially applied throughout the British Empire. After the Statute of Westminster 1931 it was gradually repealed or replaced by independent Commonwealth members.

In the Republic of Ireland it was repealed as "inoperative" by the Statute Law Revision Act 1983.

=== Canada ===
The Province of Canada passed a clarifying statute in 1865, but it only applied to the Foreign Enlistment Act 1819 and lacked any force after the 1870 statute was enacted. In 1875, MP Télesphore Fournier introduced an act to clarify the imperial act ("An Act to Prevent Enlistment in the Services of Any Foreign State in Certain Cases not provided for by the Foreign Enlistment Act, 1870") as it applied in Canada. The bill went through a first and second reading but was dropped by Prime Minister Alexander Mackenzie, who cited a lack of necessity for the law and expressed concerns that it might conflict with the imperial act.

Foreign enlistment was not a political issue again in Canada until the 1930s. The Canadian Parliament enacted the Canadian Foreign Enlistment Act of 1937 due to concerns that it would not allow for the Canadian government to successfully convict the Communist Party of Canada's ongoing effort to recruit Canadians for the International Brigades in the Spanish Civil War. The Act was passed in April 1937 and formally applied to circumstances in Spain by an order-in-council in July 1937. An investigation was conducted, prosecutors were hired, and warrants were issued for the arrest of participants in the recruiting network, but ultimately there were no prosecutions under the statute.

Up to 40,000 Canadians enlisted in the U.S. military during the Vietnam Era. Although Canada was officially neutral in the conflict, no Canadian Vietnam War veteran was prosecuted for violation of the Canadian Foreign Enlistment Act of 1937.

The Canadian Foreign Enlistment Act of 1937 remains a valid statute.

== Subsequent developments ==
In section 26 of the act, the words " or the chief secretary " were repealed by section 1 of, and the first schedule to, the Statute Law Revision Act 1953 (2 & 3 Eliz. 2. c. 5), which came into force on 18 December 1953.

In section 30 of the act, the words "as respects India, mean the Governor General and" were repealed by section 1(1) of, and part VI of schedule 1 to, the Statute Law (Repeals) Act 1976, which came into force on 27 May 1976.

== See also ==
- Neutrality Act of 1794 (US)
- British ambulances in the Franco-Prussian War
- United Nations Mercenary Convention
