= 4th Michigan Infantry Regiment (reorganized) =

- Michigan state flag
- Active: October 14, 1864, to June 10, 1866
- Country: United States
- Allegiance: Union
- Branch: Infantry

The 4th Michigan Infantry Regiment (reorganized) was an infantry regiment that served in the Union Army during the American Civil War.

== Service ==
The 4th Michigan Infantry was organized at Adrian and Grand Rapids, Michigan, and mustered into federal service October 14, 1864. The new regiment assumed the number of the original 4th Michigan that had been discharged at the completion of their enlistment on June 30, 1864.

The regiment was mustered out on June 10, 1865.

== Total strength and casualties ==
The regiment suffered 7 enlisted men who were killed in action or mortally wounded and 141 enlisted men who died of disease, for a total of 148 fatalities.

== Commanders ==
- Colonel Jairus William Hall

== See also ==
- List of Michigan Civil War Units
- Michigan in the American Civil War
