= 27th Michigan Infantry Regiment =

- Michigan state flag
- Active: April 10, 1863, to July 26, 1865
- Country: United States
- Allegiance: Union
- Branch: Infantry
- Engagements: Siege of Vicksburg; Knoxville Campaign; Battle of the Wilderness; Battle of Spotsylvania Court House; Battle of Cold Harbor; Siege of Petersburg; Battle of the Crater; Appomattox Campaign

The 27th Michigan Infantry Regiment was an infantry regiment that served in the Union Army during the American Civil War.

== Service ==
The 27th Michigan Infantry was mustered into Federal service at Port Huron, Ovid, and Ypsilanti, Michigan, on April 10, 1863.

The regiment was mustered out of service on July 26, 1865.

== Total strength and casualties ==
The regiment suffered 10 officers and 215 enlisted men who were killed in action or mortally wounded and 3 Officers and 204 enlisted men who died of disease, for a total of 432 fatalities.

== Commanders ==
- Colonel Byron M. Cutcheon
- Colonel Charles Waite

== See also ==
- List of Michigan Civil War Units
- Michigan in the American Civil War
