= 13th Independent Michigan Light Artillery Battery =

- Michigan state flag
- Active: January 20, 1864, to August 1, 1865
- Country: United States
- Allegiance: Union
- Branch: Artillery

The 13th Independent Michigan Light Artillery Battery was an artillery battery that served in the Union Army during the American Civil War.

== Service ==
Battery "M" was organized at Grand Rapids, Michigan, and mustered into service on January 20, 1864. The battery was mounted and used to fight guerrillas and on patrol duty on February 27, 1865.

The battery was mustered out on July 1, 1865.

== Total strength and casualties ==
Over its existence, the battery carried a total of 257 men on its muster rolls.

The battery had one enlisted man killed in action or mortally wounded and 13 enlisted men who died of disease, for a total of 14 fatalities.

== Commanders ==
- Captain Callahan O'Riordan

== See also ==
- List of Michigan Civil War Units
- Michigan in the American Civil War
