= Howland's Michigan Engineers Company =

Civil War engineer company of the Union Army

- Michigan state flag
- Active: September 16, 1861 to January 8, 1862
- Country: United States
- Allegiance: Union
- Branch: Engineer

Howland's Michigan Engineers Company, or the Battle Creek Engineer Corps, was an engineer company that served in the Union Army during the American Civil War.

== Service ==
The company was organized at Battle Creek, Michigan on September 16, 1861, and mustered into Federal Service on October 9, 1861. However, when Major General H.W. Halleck took command of the Department of Missouri, he decided that Howland's Company did not meet federal organizational standards. Upon notification of this fact, the company voted to disband and were subsequently mustered out of Federal Service on January 8, 1862.

== Total strength and casualties ==
Over its existence, the regiment carried a total of 53 men on its muster rolls.

== Commanders ==
- Captain Edwin P. Howland

== See also ==
- List of Michigan Civil War Units
- Michigan in the American Civil War
