= 11th Michigan Infantry Regiment (reorganized) =

- Michigan state flag
- Active: January 4, 1865, to September 16, 1865
- Country: United States
- Allegiance: Union
- Branch: Infantry
- Engagements: None

The 11th Michigan Infantry Regiment (reorganized) was an infantry regiment that served in the Union Army during the American Civil War.

The regiment spent the rest of their service, performing guard duty at Tennessee before mustering out.

== Service ==
The 11th Michigan Infantry (reorganized) was organized at Jackson, Michigan, and mustered into federal service between January 4 and February 26, 1865.

After being mustered out, the regiment marched to Nashville, Tennessee, and were assigned to the 3rd Brigade, 2nd Division of the Army of the Cumberland. The regiment was then sent to Eastern Tennessee to guard strategic points such as Chattanooga, Knoxville Railroad and Cleveland, Tennessee.

After 2 months of duty, the regiment proceeded to Knoxville and to Nashville, where it was mustered out of service.

The regiment was mustered out on September 16, 1865.

== Organizaational affiliations and detailed service ==
=== Organizational affiliation ===
During its service, the regiment was assigned to various larger formations such as:

- Attached to 3rd Brigade, 2nd Separate Division, District of the Etowah, Dept. of the Cumberland, to July, 1865.
- 2nd Brigade, 4th Division, District of East Tennessee, Dept. of the Cumberland, to September, 1865.

=== Detailed Service ===
==== 1865 ====
- Organized at Jackson, Mich., January 4 to February 26, 1865.
- Four Companies left State for Nashville, Tenn., March 4, 1865, and duty there till April 1, then ordered to Chattanooga, Tenn.
- Six Companies left State for Chattanooga, Tenn., April 1.
- Regiment moved to East Tennessee April 23, 1865, and duty guarding Chattanooga & Knoxville Railroad with Headquarters at Cleveland, Tenn., till July.
- Moved to Knoxville and duty there till August 3.
- Moved to Nashville, Tenn., August 3 and mustered out September 16, 1865.

== Commanders ==
- Col. Patrick H. Keegan

== Total strength and casualties ==
The regiment had a total enrollment of over 1,140, and suffered 96 enlisted men who died of disease, for a total of 96 fatalities.

== See also ==
- List of Michigan Civil War Units
- Michigan in the American Civil War
