= Battery A, 1st Michigan Light Artillery Regiment =

Battery "A" 1st Michigan Light Artillery Regiment
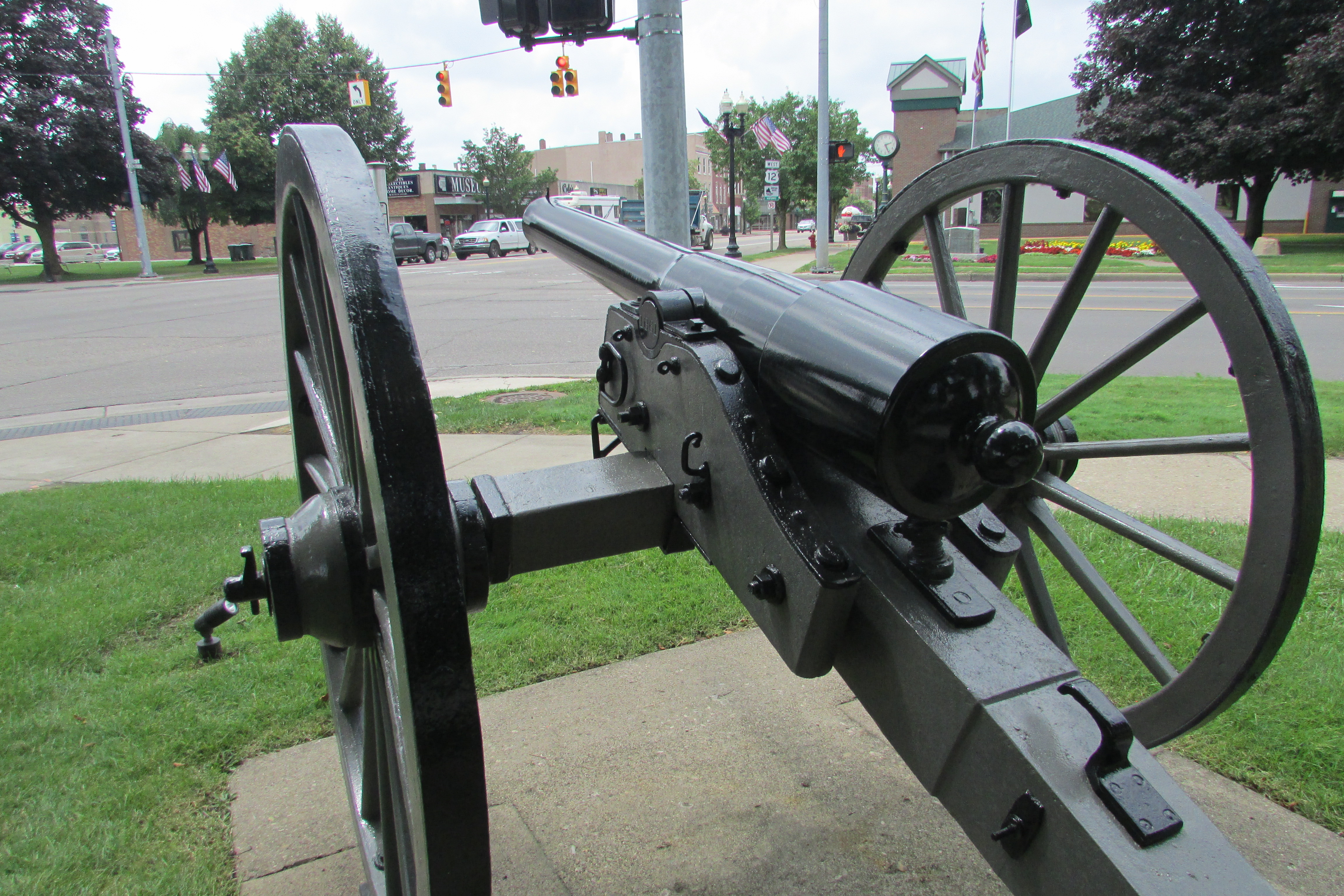
- Loomis Battery Memorial in Coldwater, Michigan.
- Active: April 23, 1861 to July 12, 1865
- Country: United States
- Allegiance: Union
- Branch: Artillery
- Equipment: 10-lb. Parrott rifles
- Engagements: Battle of Cheat Mountain; Battle of Perryville; Battle of Stones River; Battle of Chickamauga; Siege of Chattanooga

The Battery "A" 1st Michigan Light Artillery Regiment, also known as the "Loomis' Battery" or the "Coldwater Artillery," was an artillery battery that served in the Union Army during the American Civil War.

== Service ==
Battery "A" was a pre-war militia unit that tendered an offer of service and was enlisted as a body on April 23, 1861, and re-mustered in for three years' service on May 28, 1861.

The battery was mustered out on July 12, 1865.

== Total strength and casualties ==
The battery suffered 1 officer and 11 enlisted men who were killed in action or mortally wounded and 28 enlisted men who died of disease, for a total of 40 fatalities.

== Commanders ==
- Captain Cyrus O. Loomis
- Captain Francis E. Hale

== See also ==
- List of Michigan Civil War Units
- Michigan in the American Civil War
