= Battery L, 1st Michigan Light Artillery Regiment =

Battery "L" 1st Michigan Light Artillery Regiment
- Michigan state flag
- Active: April 11, 1863 to August 22, 1865
- Country: United States
- Allegiance: Union
- Branch: Artillery

The Battery "L" 1st Michigan Light Artillery Regiment was an artillery battery that served in the Union Army during the American Civil War.

== Service ==
Battery "L" was organized at Coldwater, Michigan and mustered into service on April 11, 1863.

The battery was mustered out on August 22, 1865.

== Total strength and casualties ==
Over its existence, the battery carried a total of 209 men on its muster rolls.

The battery endured 29 fatalities; one soldier killed in action and one officer and 27 enlisted men who died of disease.

== Commanders ==
- Captain Charles J. Thompson

== See also ==
- List of Michigan Civil War units
- Michigan in the American Civil War
