= Battery D, 1st Michigan Light Artillery Regiment =

Battery "D" 1st Michigan Light Artillery Regiment
- Michigan state flag
- Active: September 17, 1861 to August 3, 1865
- Country: United States
- Allegiance: Union
- Branch: Artillery
- Equipment: 10 pdr Parrott rifles
- Engagements: Battle of Perryville; Battle of Stones River; Battle of Chickamauga

The Battery "D" 1st Michigan Light Artillery Regiment was an artillery battery that served in the Union Army during the American Civil War.

== Service ==
Battery "D" was organized at Coldwater, Michigan between September 17, 1861 and December 9, 1862.

Battery was engaged at: Hoover's Gap, Tn / Chickamauga, Ga / Chattanooga, Tn / Mission Ridge, Tn/ Nashville, Tn

The battery was mustered out on August 3, 1865.

== Total strength and casualties ==
The battery lost 2 enlisted men killed in action or mortally wounded and 39 enlisted men who died of disease, for a total of 41 fatalities.

Total Enrollment—334..... Killed in Action—1..... Died of Wounds—1..... Died of Disease—39

Total Casualty Rate—11.9%

== Commanders ==
- Captain Alonzo F. Bidwell
- Captain Josiah W. Church (Captain Bidwell having resigned on August 2, 1862.)
- Captain H.B. Corbin (Captain Church having been promoted to major in the regiment on March 3, 1864)
- Captain Jesse Fuller (July 15, 1865, until they were mustered out in Jackson, Michigan, on August 3, 1865)

== See also ==
- List of Michigan Civil War Units
- Michigan in the American Civil War
