= 28th Michigan Infantry Regiment =

- Michigan state flag
- Active: October 26, 1864, to June 6, 1866
- Country: United States
- Allegiance: Union
- Branch: Infantry
- Engagements: Battle of Nashville; Battle of Wise's Forks

The 28th Michigan Infantry Regiment was an infantry regiment that served in the Union Army during the American Civil War.

== Service ==
The 28th Michigan Infantry was mustered into Federal service at Kalamazoo and Marshall, Michigan, on October 26, 1864.

The regiment was mustered out of service on July 26, 1865.

== Total strength and casualties ==
The regiment suffered 1 officer and 5 killed in action or mortally wounded and 1 officer and 126 enlisted men who died of disease, for a total of 133 fatalities.

== Commanders ==
- Colonel

== See also ==
- List of Michigan Civil War Units
- Michigan in the American Civil War
