= Battery K, 1st Michigan Light Artillery Regiment =

Battery "K" 1st Michigan Light Artillery Regiment
- Michigan state flag
- Active: November 21, 1862 to July 22, 1865
- Country: United States
- Allegiance: Union
- Branch: Artillery

The Battery "K" 1st Michigan Light Artillery Regiment was an artillery battery that served in the Union Army during the American Civil War.

== Service ==
Battery "K" was organized at Grand Rapids, Michigan between 21 November 1862 and 20 February 1863, their muster in date. They were ordered to Washington, D.C., attached to the Department of Washington under the command of Major General Samuel P. Heintzelman. The Battery remained here until the end of May 1863, when they left to garrison Fort Ramsey and Fort Buffalo near Upton Hill, VA (east of Falls Church, VA). By June, they returned to Washington.
They left the capital on 28 October 1863, now becoming part of the reserve artillery stationed in Nashville, TN. From here, they went to Chattanooga, TN in March 1864, to garrison Battery Bushnell and defend the city. During this time, several detachments from Battery K were attached to other artillery batteries, and placed on board transports and gunboats. They remained in the Chattanooga area until 31 March 1865, when they left for East Tennessee.
The battery left Tennessee on 12 July for Detroit, Michigan, where they were mustered out on 22 July 1865.

== Total strength and casualties ==
Over its existence, the battery carried a total of 209 men on its muster rolls.

The battery lost 3 officers and 1 enlisted man killed in action or mortally wounded and 14 enlisted men who died of disease, for a total of 18 fatalities.

== Commanders ==
- Captain John C. Schuetz

== See also ==
- List of Michigan Civil War Units
- Michigan in the American Civil War
