= 2nd Michigan Cavalry Regiment =

- Michigan state flag
- Active: October 2, 1861, to August 17, 1865
- Country: United States
- Allegiance: Union
- Branch: Cavalry
- Engagements: Battle of Island Number Ten; Battle of Perryville; Battle of Resaca; Battle of Franklin; Nashville

The 2nd Michigan Cavalry Regiment was a cavalry regiment that served in the Union Army during the American Civil War.

== Service ==
The 2nd Michigan Cavalry was organized at Grand Rapids, Michigan, on October 2, 1861. It numbered 1,163 officers and enlisted men upon completion of recruitment.

The 2nd Michigan Cavalry was initially placed in St. Louis at the Benton Barracks with the 2nd Iowa Cavalry. The regiment trained and drilled at the Benton Barracks under the newly promoted Colonel Gordon Granger.

The 2nd Michigan Cavalry joined a newly formed cavalry brigade in John Pope's Army of the Mississippi. At the Battle of Island Number Ten, Ltc. Seldon H. Gorham was acting as head of the regiment as Col. Gordon Granger was elevated to lead the brigade. The brigade consisted of two regiments, the 2nd Michigan and 3rd Michigan Cavalry. "Granger's 2nd Michigan Cavalry helped capture Point Pleasant, 12 miles southwest of New Madrid where the river could be blocked to prevent Confederate reinforcements coming up."

The regiment was mustered out of service on August 17, 1865.

== Total strength and casualties ==
The regiment suffered 4 officers and 70 enlisted men killed in action or mortally wounded and 2 officers and 266 enlisted men who died of disease, for a total of 342 fatalities.=

== Commanders ==
- Col. Gordon Granger
- Col. Philip H. Sheridan
- Col. Archibald P. Campbell

== See also ==
- List of Michigan Civil War Units
- Michigan in the American Civil War
