= Battery H, 1st Michigan Light Artillery Regiment =

Battery "H" 1st Michigan Light Artillery Regiment (8th Battery Michigan Light Artillery)
- Michigan state flag
- Active: March 6, 1862 to July 22, 1865
- Country: United States
- Allegiance: Union
- Branch: Artillery
- Size: Artillery battery
- Nickname: De Golyer's 8th Michigan Battery
- Equipment: 4 x 14-pounder James rifles, 2 x 12-pounder howitzers
- Engagements: Battle of Raymond; Battle of Champion Hill; Battle of Big Black River; Siege of Vicksburg; Battle of Kennesaw Mountain; Battle of Atlanta

Commanders
- Notable commanders: Samuel De Golyer

Battery "H" 1st Michigan Light Artillery Regiment also known as 8th Battery Michigan Light Artillery, was an artillery battery from Michigan that served in the Union Army during the American Civil War. The unit also went by the name De Golyer's Battery or De Golyer's 8th Michigan Battery after its commander, Captain Samuel De Golyer.

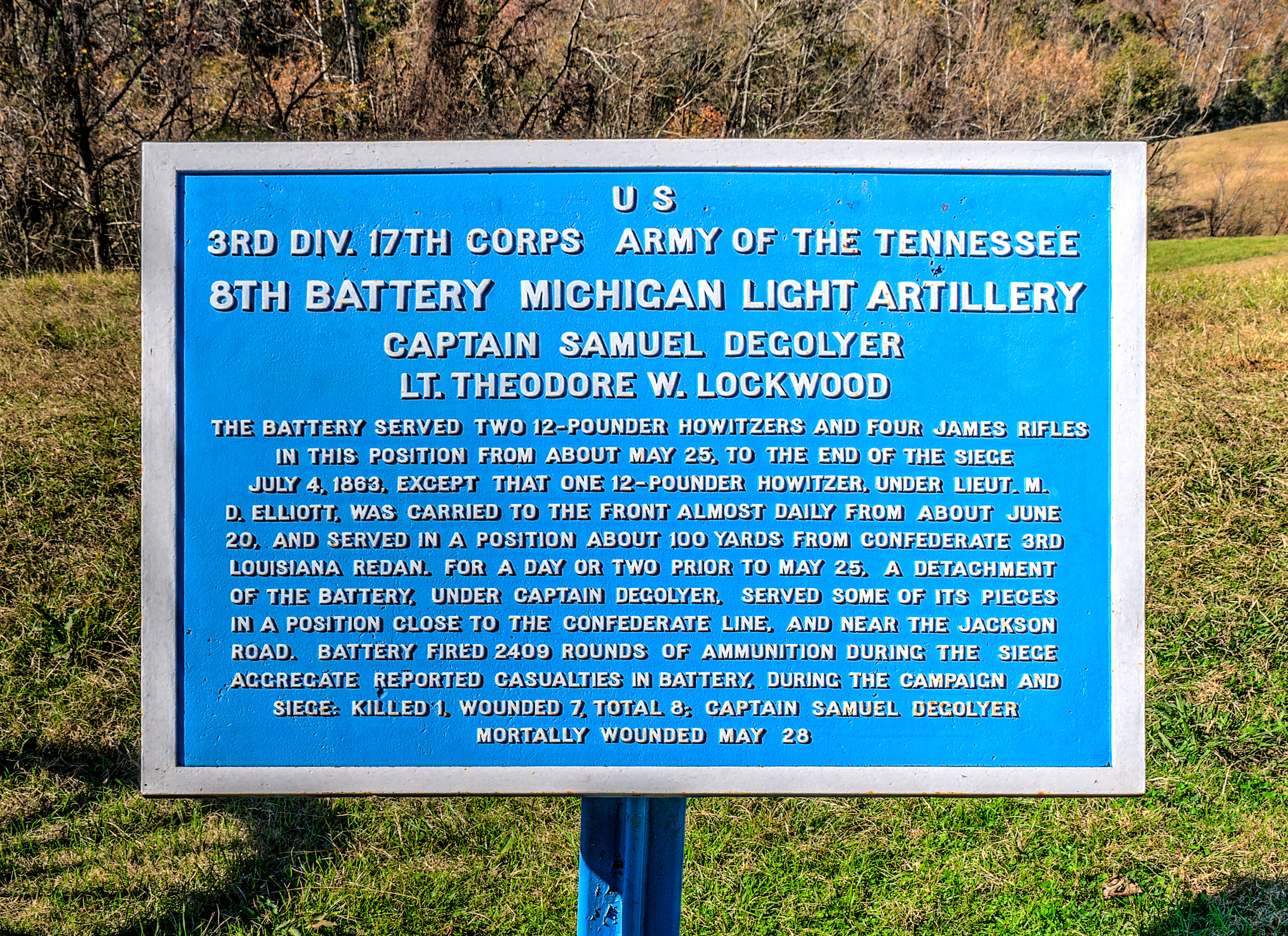
Marker at Vicksburg National Military Park

== Service ==
Battery "H" was organized at Monroe, Michigan and mustered into service on March 6, 1862.

At the Battle of Champion Hill on 16 May 1863, the battery was attached to John A. Logan's division in the XVII Corps. It unlimbered behind Mortimer Dormer Leggett's brigade and opened fire at the beginning of the action. The battery's six guns included four 14-pounder James rifles and two M1841 12-pounder howitzers. Later, the battery was sent to support John Dunlap Stevenson's brigade on the right flank. At the end of the battle, the battery shelled the Confederates at the upper crossing, causing them to retreat.

The battery was mustered out on July 22, 1865.

== Total strength and casualties ==
Over its existence, the battery carried a total of 336 men on its muster rolls.

The battery lost 2 officers and 3 enlisted men killed in action or mortally wounded and 42 enlisted men who died of disease, for a total of 47 fatalities.

== Commanders ==
- Captain Major F. Lockwood
- Captain Samuel De Goyer

== See also ==
- List of Michigan Civil War Units
- Michigan in the American Civil War

Captain (Then Lt.) Marcus D. Elliot assumed command after the death of Captain DeGoyler, 8 August 1863.

Captain (Brevet) William H. Justin assumed Command during the Battle of Atlanta and the Battle of Lovejoy Station in August 1864.
