= Battery G, 1st Michigan Light Artillery Regiment =

Battery "G" 1st Michigan Light Artillery Regiment
- Michigan state flag
- Active: January 17, 1862 to August 6, 1865
- Country: United States
- Allegiance: Union
- Branch: Artillery
- Engagements: Battle of Port Gibson; Battle of Champion Hill; Battle of Big Black River; Siege of Vicksburg

The Battery "G" 1st Michigan Light Artillery Regiment was an artillery battery that served in the Union Army during the American Civil War.

== Service ==
Battery "G" was organized at Kalamazoo, Michigan and mustered into service on January 17, 1862.

The battery was mustered out on August 6, 1865.

== Total strength and casualties ==
Over its existence, the battery carried a total of 320 men on its muster rolls.

The battery lost 4 enlisted men killed in action or mortally wounded and 1 officer and 41 enlisted men who died of disease, for a total of 46 fatalities.

== Commanders ==
- Captain Charles H. Lamphere

== See also ==
- List of Michigan Civil War Units
- Michigan in the American Civil War
