= 30th Michigan Infantry Regiment =

- Michigan state flag
- Active: January 9, 1865, to June 30, 1865
- Country: United States
- Allegiance: Union
- Branch: Infantry
- Engagements: None

The 30th Michigan Infantry Regiment was an infantry regiment that served in the Union Army during the American Civil War.

== Service ==
The 30th Michigan Infantry was organized at Detroit, Michigan and mustered into Federal service on January 9, 1865.

The regiment served as garrison of the Detroit and St. Clair Rivers on the border with Canada and saw no service in the field.

The regiment was mustered out on June 30, 1865.

== Total strength and casualties ==
The regiment suffered 18 enlisted men who died of disease, for a total of 18 fatalities.

== Commanders ==
- Colonel Grover Salman Wormer

== See also ==
- List of Michigan Civil War Units
- Michigan in the American Civil War
