= 25th Michigan Infantry Regiment =

Infantry regiment of the Union Army from 1862 to 1865

- Michigan state flag
- Active: September 22, 1862, to June 24, 1865
- Country: United States
- Allegiance: Union
- Branch: Infantry
- Engagements: Morgan's Raid; Battle of Tebbs Bend; Battle of Resaca; Battle of Kennesaw Mountain; Battle of Atlanta; Siege of Atlanta; Battle of Jonesboro; Battle of Franklin; Battle of Nashville; Campaign of the Carolinas

The 25th Michigan Infantry Regiment was an infantry regiment that served in the Union Army during the American Civil War.

== Service ==
The 25th Michigan Infantry was mustered into Federal service at Kalamazoo, Michigan, on September 22, 1862. The regiment was mustered out of service on June 24, 1865, at Salisbury, NC. The Regiment was first commanded by Col Orlando Hurley Moore from Schoolcraft and then by Benjamin Orcutt from Kalamazoo, MI who became the Lt. Colonel of the Regiment for the duration of service. Major Dewitt C. Fitch of Mattawan, Surgeon was Bolivar Barnum of Schoolcraft. First Assistant Surgeon was Francis Oakley of York. Second Assistant Surgeon John N. Greggs of Schoolcraft. Adjutant Charles H. brown of Kalamazoo. Quartermaster was John M. Ridlon, Paw Paw. Chaplin was Albert L. Payson of Schoolcraft.

On July 4, 1863 the 25th Michigan, Companies D, E, F, I, and K (about 250 men) defeated Gen John Hunt Morgan's Kentucky Cavalry Brigade, which numbered more than 2,400 troopers plus a Battery of Artillery. The 25th Michigan was under the command of Col Orlando Hurley Moore and was armed solely with Model 1853 Enfield rifled muskets, a few pistols, and a few swords. This was the first battle that Morgan fought in what became known as Morgan's Great Indiana and Ohio Raid.

== Total strength and casualties ==
The regiment suffered 1 officer and 34 enlisted men who were killed in action or mortally wounded and 2 officers and 141 enlisted men who died of disease, for a total of 178 fatalities.

== Commanders ==
- Colonel O.H. Moore

== See also ==
- List of Michigan Civil War Units
- Michigan in the American Civil War
