= Minor Michigan cavalry units in the American Civil War =

== 1st United States Lancers Regiment ==
The regiment was organized by Colonel Arthur Rankin of Windsor, Ontario at Detroit, Saginaw, and St. Johns, Michigan between November 30. 1861, to February 20, 1862, and was mustered out on March 20, 1862, without seeing active service.

686 men were recruited before creation of the regiment was abandoned.

== Chandler's Horse Guard ==
The unit was organized by Major William C. Hughs at Coldwater, Michigan on September 19, 1861, and was mustered out after three months of service on November 22, 1861, as the battalion did not conform to Federal mustering regulations. The unit was remusted and reequipped, but refused to obey an order to remuster in and the unit was discontinued. 189 men served in the Horse Guard.

== See also ==
- List of Michigan Civil War Units
- Michigan in the American Civil War
