= 23rd Michigan Infantry Regiment =

- Michigan state flag
- Active: September 13, 1862, to June 28, 1865
- Country: United States
- Allegiance: Union
- Branch: Infantry
- Engagements: Siege of Knoxville; >Battle of Resaca; Battle of Kennesaw Mountain; Battle of Atlanta; Siege of Atlanta; Battle of Jonesboro; Battle of Franklin; Battle of Nashville; Campaign of the Carolinas

The 23rd Michigan Infantry Regiment was an infantry regiment that served in the Union Army during the American Civil War.

== Service ==
The 23rd Michigan Infantry was mustered into Federal service at East Saginaw, Michigan, on September 13, 1862.

The regiment was mustered out of service on June 28, 1865.

== Total strength and casualties ==
The regiment suffered 3 officers and 70 enlisted men who were killed in action or mortally wounded and 4 officers and 257 enlisted men who died of disease, for a total of 334 fatalities.

== Commanders ==
- Colonel David Jerome, a future Governor of Michigan
- Colonel Oliver L. Spaulding

== See also ==
- List of Michigan Civil War Units
- Michigan in the American Civil War
