= Battery C, 1st Michigan Light Artillery Regiment =

Battery "C" 1st Michigan Light Artillery Regiment
- Active: November 23, 1861 to June 22, 1865
- Country: United States
- Allegiance: Union
- Branch: Artillery
- Equipment: 10 pdr Parrott rifles
- Engagements: Battle of Iuka; Battle of Resaca; Battle of Kennesaw Mountain; March to the Sea

The Battery "C" 1st Michigan Light Artillery Regiment was an artillery battery that served in the Union Army during the American Civil War.

== Service ==
Battery "C" was organized at Grand Rapids, Michigan between November 23 and December 17, 1861. The battery was mustered into Federal service on November 28, 1861.

The battery was mustered out on June 22, 1865.

== Total strength and casualties ==
Over its existence, the battery carried a total of 235 men on its muster rolls.

The battery lost 3 enlisted men killed in action or mortally wounded and 34 enlisted men who died of disease, for a total of 37 fatalities.

== Commanders ==
- Captain Alexander W. Dees
- Captain George Robinson

== See also ==
- List of Michigan Civil War Units
- Michigan in the American Civil War
