= Battery M, 1st Michigan Light Artillery Regiment =

Battery "M" 1st Michigan Light Artillery Regiment
- Michigan state flag
- Active: June 30, 1863 to August 1, 1865
- Country: United States
- Allegiance: Union
- Branch: Artillery

Battery "M" 1st Michigan Light Artillery Regiment was an artillery battery that served in the Union Army during the American Civil War.

== Service ==
Battery "M" was organized at Detroit, Mount Clemens and Dearborn, Michigan and mustered into service on June 30, 1863.

The battery was mustered out on August 1, 1865.

== Total strength and casualties ==
Over its existence, the battery carried a total of 261 men on its muster rolls.

The battery endured 18 fatalities during the war; three soldiers killed in action or mortally wounded and another 15 enlisted men who died of disease.

== Commanders ==
- Captain Edwin G. Hilliar

== See also ==
- List of Michigan Civil War units
- Michigan in the American Civil War
