= Battery B, 1st Michigan Light Artillery Regiment =

Battery "B" 1st Michigan Light Artillery Regiment
- Active: September 10, 1861 to June 14, 1865
- Country: United States
- Allegiance: Union
- Branch: Artillery
- Equipment: 10-lb. Parrott rifles
- Engagements: Battle of Resaca; March to the Sea; Battle of Bentonville

The Battery "B" 1st Michigan Light Artillery Regiment was an artillery battery that served in the Union Army during the American Civil War.

== Service ==
Battery "B" was organized at Grand Rapids, Michigan between September 10 and December 14, 1861.

The battery was mustered out on June 14, 1865.

== Total strength and casualties ==
Over its existence, the battery carried a total of 240 men on its muster rolls.

The battery lost 1 officer and 1 enlisted man killed in action or mortally wounded and 35 enlisted men who died of disease, for a total of 37 fatalities.

== Commanders ==
- Captain William H. Ross

== See also ==
- List of Michigan Civil War Units
- Michigan in the American Civil War
