= Grover S. Wormer =

American Union Army general (1821–1904)

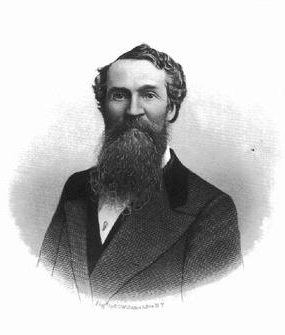
- Born: August 9, 1821; Auburn, New York, U.S.
- Died: January 26, 1904 (aged 82); Detroit, Michigan, U.S.
- Burial place: Elmwood Cemetery
- Military career
- Allegiance: United States
- Branch: United States Army; Union Army
- Rank: colonel
- Unit: 30th Michigan Volunteer Infantry Regiment
- Conflicts: American Civil War
- Other work: merchant

Grover Salmon Wormer (August 9, 1821 – January 26, 1904) was a Union Army officer during the American Civil War.

Grover Wormer was born at Auburn, New York, on August 9, 1821. His father was a soldier from Massachusetts who fought in the War of 1812. Wormer was a steamboat builder before the Civil War.

Wormer served with the Stanton Guards (Michigan) as a captain, mustered out September 25, 1862, 8th Michigan Volunteer Cavalry Regiment as lieutenant colonel, October 3, 1862, and 30th Michigan Volunteer Infantry Regiment as colonel, November 21, 1864. He was mustered out of the volunteers on June 30, 1865.

On March 23, 1867, President Andrew Johnson nominated Wormer for appointment to the grade of brevet brigadier general of volunteers, to rank from March 13, 1865, and the United States Senate confirmed the appointment on March 28, 1867.

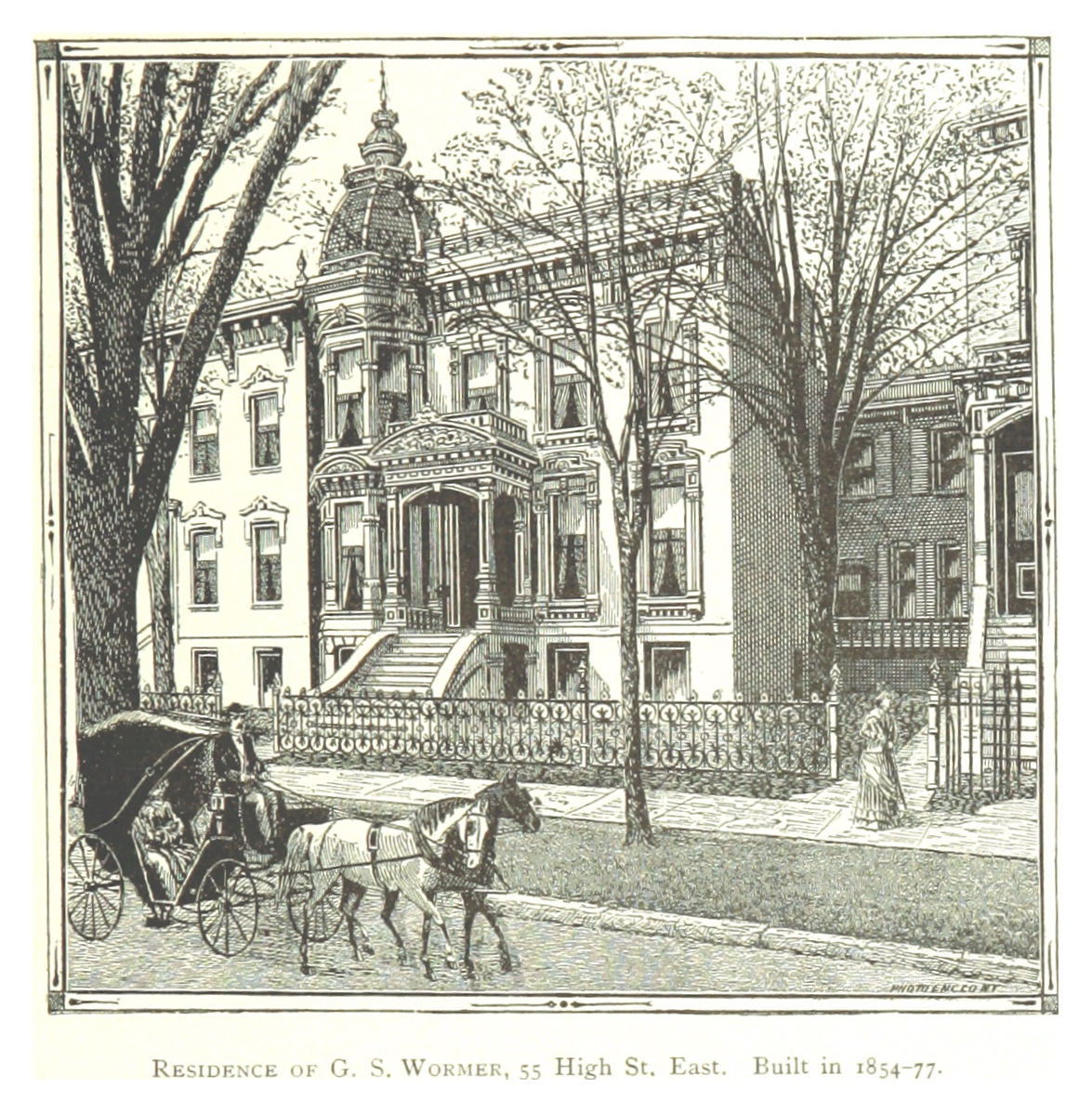
His house in 115 E Vernor (originally 55 E High) in Detroit demolished in 1960s for the Fisher Freewey.

After the war, Wormer was a merchant in Detroit, Michigan. He died in Detroit on January 26, 1904. He is buried at Elmwood Cemetery.

== See also ==
- List of American Civil War brevet generals (Union)
