= 2/1st Medium Regiment (Australia) =

Australian Army artillery unit

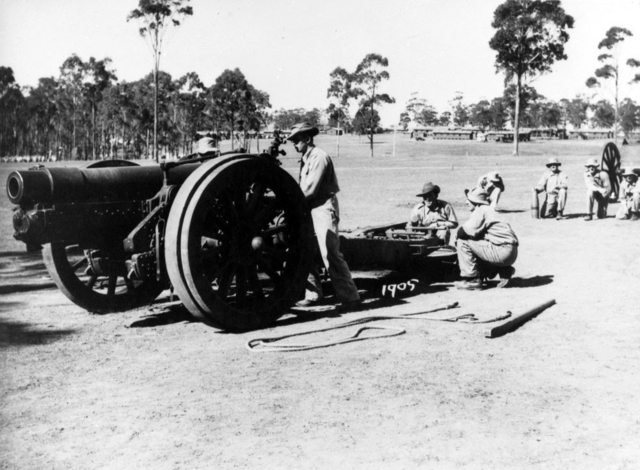
- 2/1st Medium Regiment training at Ingleburn, 1940
- Active: 1940–1945
- Country: Australia
- Branch: Army
- Type: Artillery
- Size: 2 batteries
- Part of: I Corps; II Corps; 23rd Brigade; 11th Division; 5th Division
- Colours: Blue and red
- Engagements: World War II: North African campaign; New Guinea campaign; Home front

The 2/1st Medium Regiment was an artillery regiment of the Australian Army during World War II. Raised in 1940 as part of the all volunteer Second Australian Imperial Force, the regiment undertook garrison duties in Australia, Nauru and on Ocean Island, and served in the Middle East. It was converted to a field regiment, designated the 2/13th Army Field Regiment, due to a lack of howitzers, but was later converted back into a medium regiment. During 1943–1944, the regiment served as the 2/13th Composite Anti Aircraft Regiment before returning to the medium role. It was disbanded in July 1945, in Queensland.

== History ==
The regiment was raised in May 1940 in Ingleburn, New South Wales, as part of the all volunteer Second Australian Imperial Force. Its first commanding officer was Lieutenant Colonel E.J.W Pope. Upon formation it consisted of two batteries: the 1st and 2nd Medium Batteries. Training was undertaken at Ingleburn with six-inch howitzers.

In October 1940, the regiment was converted into a field regiment due to a shortage of medium artillery pieces, designated as the 2/13th Army Field Regiment. As a field regiment, it consisted of the 25th and 26th Batteries. As a corps-level unit, it was assigned directly to I Corps. In February 1941, the regiment deployed two detachments of around 50 personnel and two 18-pounders to Nauru and Ocean Island as garrison troops as part of Heron Force and Wren Force; they were relieved in August 1941 and returned to Australia. Meanwhile, the rest of the regiment was deployed to Darwin, Northern Territory from in Cowra, New South Wales, in April 1941 in support of the 23rd Infantry Brigade. While in the Northern Territory, the regiment was based in Winnellie. In July 1941, the regiment handed over its equipment to the 2/14th Field Regiment.

The regiment deployed to the Middle East in September 1941. The regiment was initially based at Hill 93 in Palestine. In October 1941, the regiment reverted to a medium regiment. At that time it received sixteen US-made, French-designed 155 mm howitzers. They moved to Beit Jirja and then later Beir Suneid, but did not see combat before being brought back to Australia in March 1942 and saw no further active service throughout the war.

On return to Australia, the regiment landed in Adelaide and then moved to Queensland via Ingleburn. By July 1942, the 2/1st Medium Regiment, still under the command of Pope was assigned to the corps artillery within I Corps, based in Toowoomba, Queensland. The regiment provided some personnel for the 1st Mountain Battery, which served in the New Guinea campaign. By January 1943, the regiment was based in Helidon, Queensland.

There was little need for medium artillery in the Pacific, and as a result the regiment was underemployed. In July 1943, it was converted into the 2/13th Composite Anti Aircraft Regiment at Chermside, Queensland; at this time it consisted of the 14th Heavy Anti Aircraft and 15th Light Anti Aircraft Batteries. Part of the 14th HAA Battery was detached in November 1944 to provide anti aircraft defence around Buna in New Guinea, during operations to secure Finschafen, remaining there until May 1944. Meanwhile, in January 1944, the regiment was transferred to Southport, Queensland, and in September 1944 it briefly gained the 84th Mobile Searchlight Battery before this sub unit was deployed to New Guinea in November. The regiment then moved to Mapee, where they came under the command of II Corps; in August, they were reassigned to the 11th Division around Kairi, Queensland.

In December 1944, the regiment returned to the medium role, as the need for anti-aircraft defences in Australia diminished due to the decline in Japanese air power as the war progressed. At this time, it readopted the 2/1st Medium Regiment designation, and consisting of the 1st and 2nd Medium Batteries. For a period was assigned to the 5th Division. It remained in Australia and did not see further action until it was disbanded on 31 July 1945, while at Kairi, as it was deemed surplus to requirements.
