= List of Michigan units in the American Civil War =

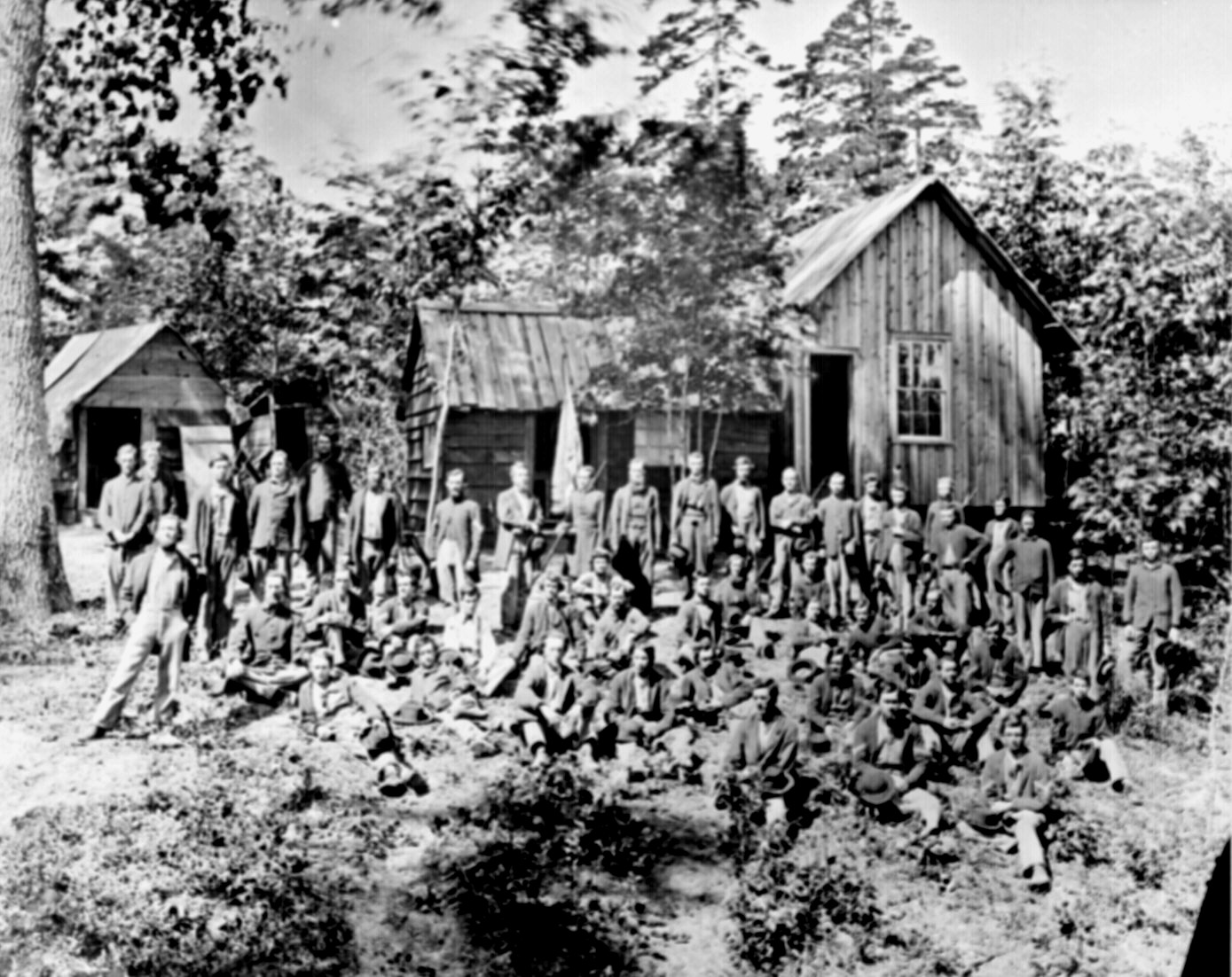
21st Michigan Volunteer Infantry Regiment

This article provides a list of Michigan military units active during the American Civil War. As a northern state, Michigan was part of the Union, and its units were active during the entire length of the war. Units included the Michigan Brigade (known as the "Wolverines"), which served under George Armstrong Custer during the Gettysburg campaign. Michigan was unique among the Northern States as instead of forming new units the state would send recruits to their units already in the field to be under the command of veteran officers and enlisted instead of the entire regiment being green.

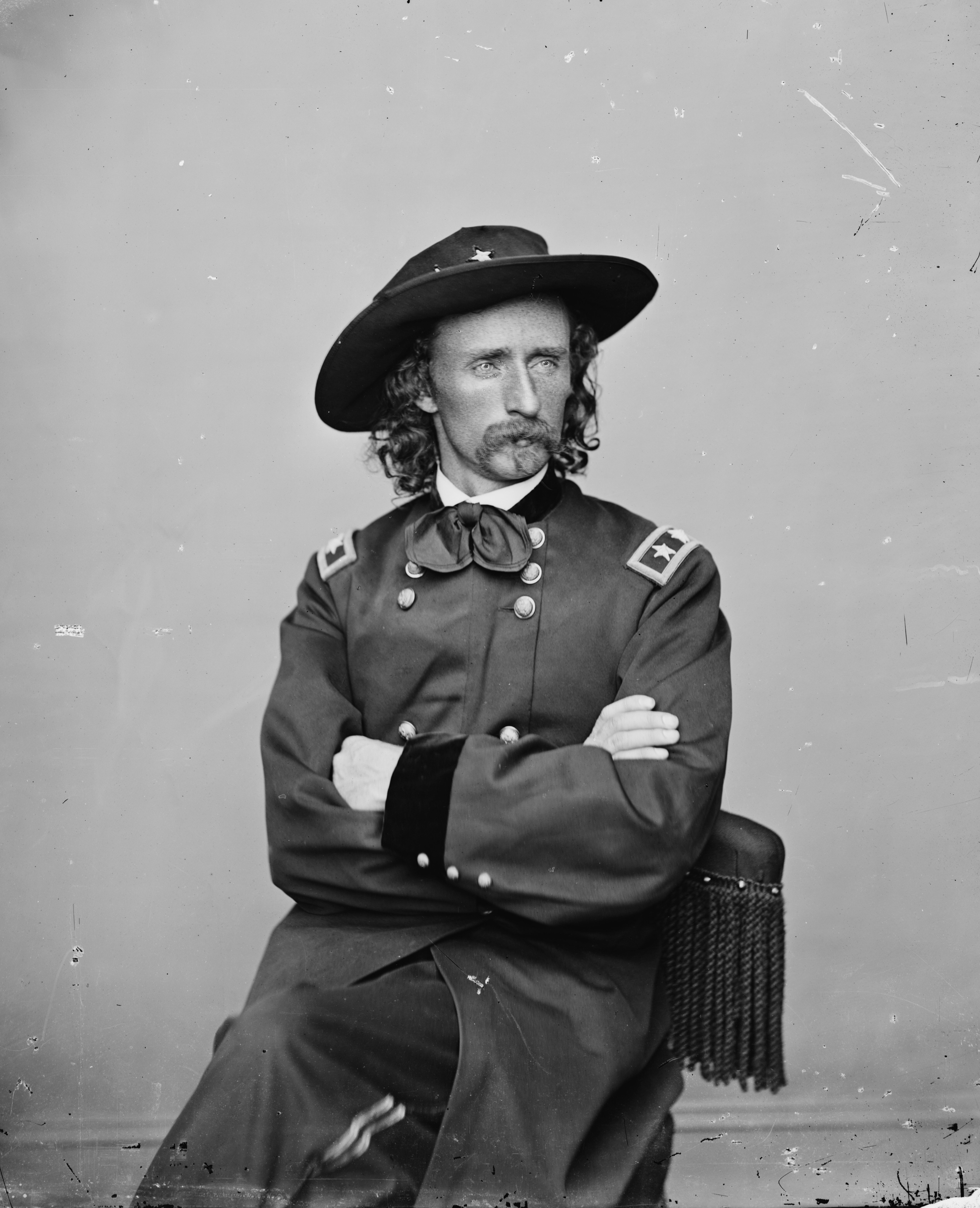
George Armstrong Custer, led the Michigan Brigade, called the "Wolverines"

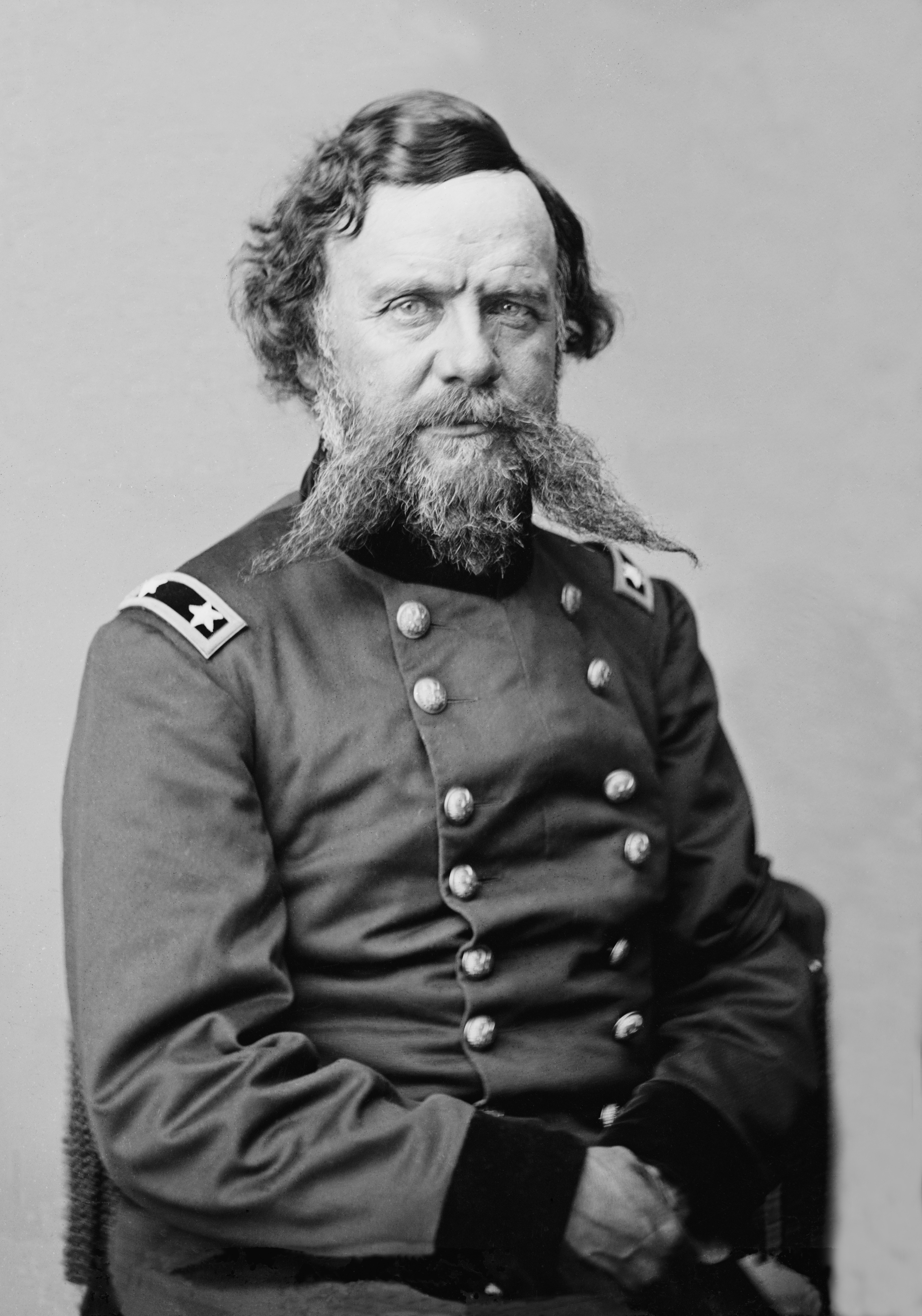
Gen. Alpheus S. Williams trained the first Michigan volunteer units in 1861.

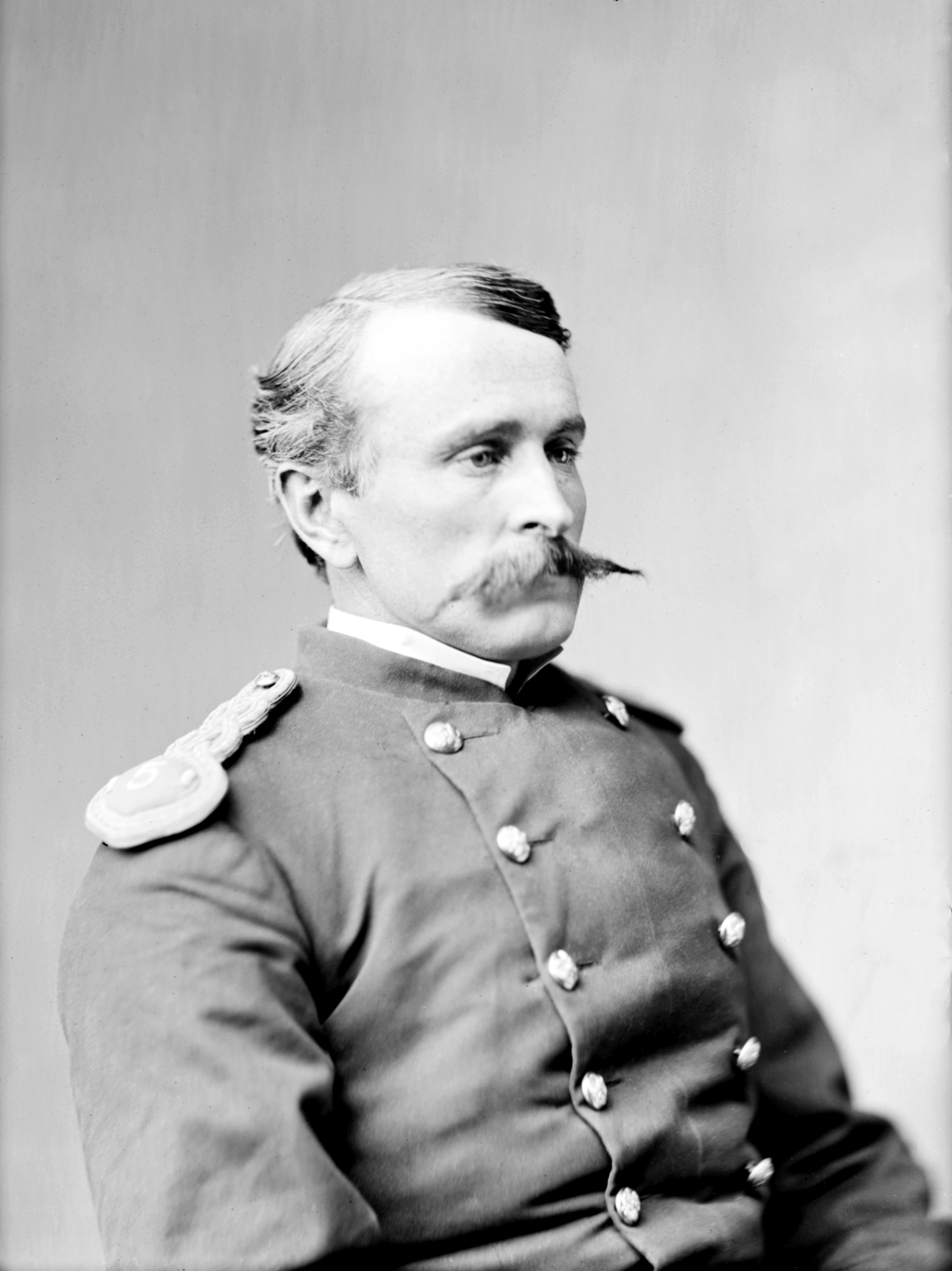
As a captain in the 19th Michigan, Frank Baldwin was awarded the Medal of Honor.

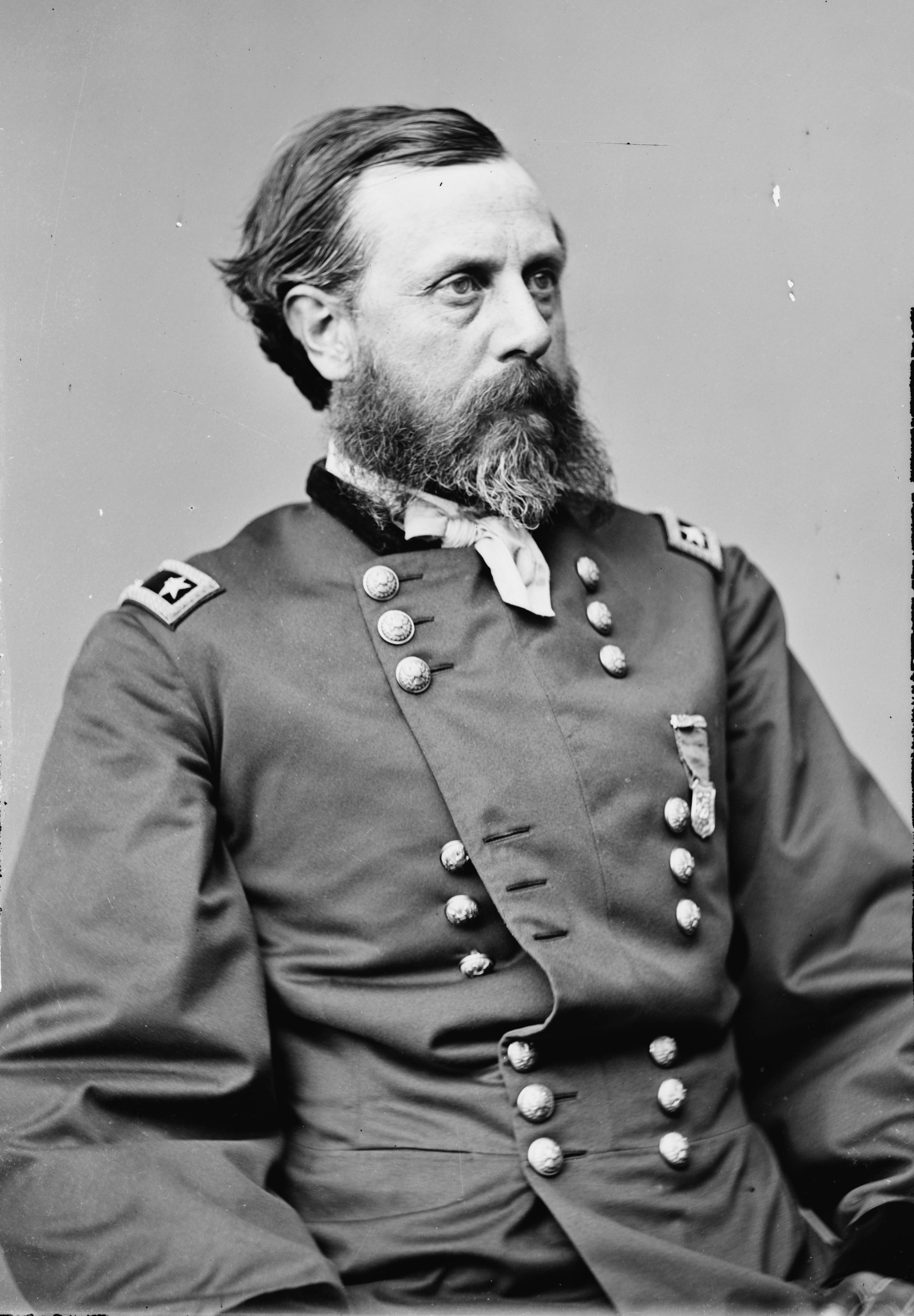
Orlando B. Willcox was the first colonel of the 1st Michigan Infantry

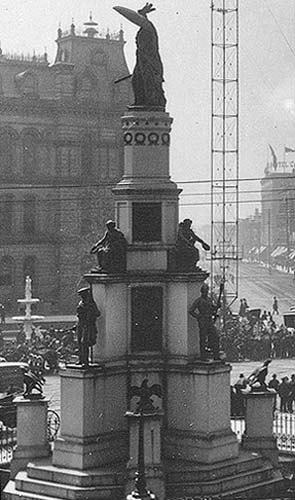
The Michigan Soldiers and Sailors Monument in Detroit is one of many monuments to Michigan's soldiers

== Infantry ==
- 1st Michigan Volunteer Infantry Regiment (3 months)
- 1st Michigan Volunteer Infantry Regiment (3 years)
- 1st Michigan Colored Volunteer Infantry Regiment - African-American, later 102nd Regiment United States Colored Troops
- 2nd Michigan Volunteer Infantry Regiment
- 3rd Michigan Volunteer Infantry Regiment
- 3rd Michigan Volunteer Infantry Regiment (reorganized)
- 4th Michigan Volunteer Infantry Regiment
- 4th Michigan Volunteer Infantry Regiment (reorganized)
- 5th Michigan Volunteer Infantry Regiment
- 6th Michigan Volunteer Infantry Regiment
- 7th Michigan Volunteer Infantry Regiment
- 8th Michigan Volunteer Infantry Regiment
- 9th Michigan Volunteer Infantry Regiment
- 10th Michigan Volunteer Infantry Regiment
- 11th Michigan Volunteer Infantry Regiment
- 11th Michigan Volunteer Infantry Regiment (reorganized)
- 12th Michigan Volunteer Infantry Regiment
- 13th Michigan Volunteer Infantry Regiment
- 14th Michigan Volunteer Infantry Regiment
- 15th Michigan Volunteer Infantry Regiment
- 16th Michigan Volunteer Infantry Regiment - Stockton's Independent Regiment
- 17th Michigan Volunteer Infantry Regiment - Stonewall Regiment
- 18th Michigan Volunteer Infantry Regiment
- 19th Michigan Volunteer Infantry Regiment
- 20th Michigan Volunteer Infantry Regiment
- 21st Michigan Volunteer Infantry Regiment
- 22nd Michigan Volunteer Infantry Regiment
- 23rd Michigan Volunteer Infantry Regiment
- 24th Michigan Volunteer Infantry Regiment - member of the Iron Brigade
- 25th Michigan Volunteer Infantry Regiment
- 26th Michigan Volunteer Infantry Regiment
- 27th Michigan Volunteer Infantry Regiment
- 28th Michigan Volunteer Infantry Regiment
- 29th Michigan Volunteer Infantry Regiment
- 30th Michigan Volunteer Infantry Regiment
- Stanton Guard
- Independent Company (Provost Guard)
- A number of Michiganders fought with units from other states as well, most notably for the 23rd Illinois Infantry Regiment, the 37th Illinois Infantry Regiment, the 42nd Illinois Infantry Regiment, the 44th Illinois Infantry Regiment, the 70th New York Infantry Regiment, and the 47th Ohio Infantry Regiment.
- Hundreds of Michiganders also fought for the regular army as well, with 104 Michigan men in the 2nd Infantry Regiment (United States), 242 in the 11th Infantry Regiment (United States), and almost the entire 19th Infantry Regiment (United States).

== Sharpshooters ==
- 1st Regiment Michigan Volunteer Sharpshooters
- Hall's Independent Battalion Michigan Volunteer Sharpshooters
- Brady's Independent Company Michigan Volunteer Sharpshooters
- Dygert's Independent Company Michigan Volunteer Sharpshooters
- Jardine's Independent Company Michigan Volunteer Sharpshooters
- Company "C" 1st United States Sharpshooters Regiment
- Company "I" 1st United States Sharpshooters Regiment
- Company "K" 1st United States Sharpshooters Regiment
- Company "B" 2nd United States Sharpshooters Regiment
- Company "D" Western Sharpshooters Regiment

== Cavalry ==
- 1st Michigan Volunteer Cavalry Regiment
- 2nd Michigan Volunteer Cavalry Regiment
- 3rd Michigan Volunteer Cavalry Regiment
- 4th Michigan Volunteer Cavalry Regiment
- 5th Michigan Volunteer Cavalry Regiment
- 6th Michigan Volunteer Cavalry Regiment
- 7th Michigan Volunteer Cavalry Regiment
- 8th Michigan Volunteer Cavalry Regiment
- 9th Michigan Volunteer Cavalry Regiment
- 10th Michigan Volunteer Cavalry Regiment
- 11th Michigan Volunteer Cavalry Regiment
- 1st United States Lancer Regiment
- Chandler's Horse Guard
- 2nd Missouri Cavalry Regiment also known as Merrill’s Horse, Companies H, I, and L were organized in Battle Creek, Michigan
- 1st New York Cavalry Regiment Company K was organized in Grand Rapids, Michigan

== Artillery ==
- 1st Regiment Michigan Light Artillery
  - Battery "A" 1st Regiment Michigan Light Artillery – (Loomis Battery, Coldwater Artillery)
  - Battery "B" 1st Regiment Michigan Light Artillery
  - Battery "C" 1st Regiment Michigan Light Artillery – (Robinson's Battery, Grand Rapids Battle Creek Area)
  - Battery "D" 1st Regiment Michigan Light Artillery
  - Battery "E" 1st Regiment Michigan Light Artillery
  - Battery "F" 1st Regiment Michigan Light Artillery
  - Battery "G" 1st Regiment Michigan Light Artillery
  - Battery "H" 1st Regiment Michigan Light Artillery – (De Golyer's Battery)
  - Battery "I" 1st Regiment Michigan Light Artillery
  - Battery "K" 1st Regiment Michigan Light Artillery
  - Battery "L" 1st Regiment Michigan Light Artillery
  - Battery "M" 1st Regiment Michigan Light Artillery
- 6th Regiment Michigan Volunteer Heavy Artillery
- 13th Independent Battery Michigan Light Artillery
- 14th Independent Battery Michigan Light Artillery
- a number of men from the 24th Michigan Infantry Regiment were assigned to 4th U.S. Light Artillery, Battery B during the Civil War.
- Captain George A. Woodruff of Marshall, Michigan, a graduate of the United States Military Academy class of 1861, was in command of 1st U.S. Light Artillery, Battery I during the Civil War until he was mortally wounded at the Battle of Gettysburg helping to defend against Pickett’s Charge.

== Engineers ==
- 1st Regiment Michigan Volunteer Engineers and Mechanics
- Howland's Company Michigan Volunteer Engineers

== Michigan Cavalry Brigade ==
The Michigan Cavalry Brigade was a brigade of volunteer cavalry during the latter half of the war. Composed primarily of the 1st, 5th, 6th and 7th Michigan Cavalry Regiments the Michigan Brigade fought in every major campaign of the Army of the Potomac from the Battle of Gettysburg in July 1863 to the Confederate surrender at Appomattox Court House in April 1865.

== See also ==
- Minor Michigan Cavalry Units of the American Civil War
- Minor Michigan infantry units of the American Civil War
- Lists of American Civil War Regiments by State
- United States Colored Troops
