= 1st Medium Regiment (South Africa) =

1 Medium Regiment (S.A.H.A), S.A.A.
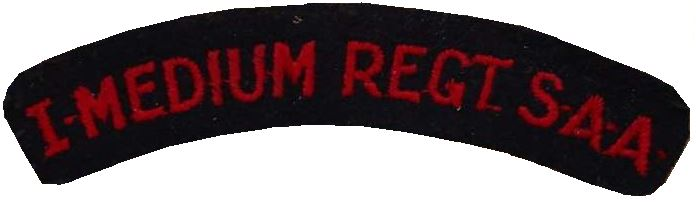
- 1 Medium Regiment (S.A.H.A), S.A.A.
- Active: 1946–1960
- Allegiance: Union of South Africa; Union of South Africa; United Kingdom
- Branch: South African Army
- Type: Artillery
- Size: Regiment
- Part of: South African Artillery Corps
- Battle honours

1st Medium Regiment was an artillery regiment of the South African Army, formed in 1946 following World War II.

== History ==
=== Origin ===
1st Medium Regiment. South African Artillery, (SAHA), was established with headquarters in Cape Town on 1 January 1946. Appointed to command the regiment was Lt Colonel Norman Munnik, having originally been commissioned into the 1st Heavy Battery, Coast Artillery on the 30 July 1935 as a 2nd Lieutenant.

Lt Colonel Frank Whitmore Mellish, MC was also appointed as the regiment's Honorary Colonel, with effect from 17 September 1946.

=== Similar Unit ===
This regiment should not be confused with another regiment of identical title in the UDF history, an Active Citizen Force (ACF) unit formed in Johannesburg around 1939, specifically to continue the memory of the South African Heavy Artillery batteries that fought in France in 1915–1918.

=== Recruitment ===
Those citizens who had been balloted to ACF units around Cape Town, reported to the New Drill Hall at Tennant Street in Cape Town, for medical examination and attestation.

=== Training ===
After receiving their kit, recruits started about five months of training. Foot and rifle drill, parades took place every Tuesday and Thursday nights at the early morning market in Sir Lowry Road. Mustering training took place at Youngsfield where the regiment had its hangar storing its soft vehicles, Jeeps, Ford 1 ton radio vehicles, 3 ton cargo, Mack gun tractors, 5.5 inch guns and all associated stores and equipment. Training took place on Saturdays and two full Saturdays per month for part of the year were normally allocated.

1 Medium Regiment with Cape Field Artillery utilised the military camp at Oudtshoorn for live fire training. Recruit camps were about three weeks at the end of which the continuous training period ended on the range conducting "dry runs" and live shell firing first with 25-pounders and on the last day, with 5.5 inch guns.

=== Converted to an Afrikaans speaking regiment ===
The regiment was declared an Afrikaans unit in the early 1950s and training gunnery terminology had to be translated at Oudtshoorn from English.

=== Transferred to Outeniqua Command ===
On 5 November 1953, it was announced that 1 Medium Regiment was being transferred to Outeniqua Command and in doing so Cape Town lost its most important Afrikaans speaking unit.

=== Disbandment ===
The regiment was finally disbanded and disestablished on 1 March 1960, when the Citizen Force was once again reorganised.

== Leadership ==
- Lt Colonel Norman Elijah Munnik 1946–1960
