= Battery E, 1st Michigan Light Artillery Regiment =

Battery "E" 1st Michigan Light Artillery Regiment
- Michigan state flag
- Active: December 6, 1861 to July 30, 1865
- Country: United States
- Allegiance: Union
- Branch: Artillery
- Engagements: Battle of Nashville

The Battery "E" 1st Michigan Light Artillery Regiment was an artillery battery that served in the Union Army during the American Civil War.

== Service ==
Battery "E" was organized at Grand Rapids, Albion, and Marshall, Michigan and was mustered into service on December 6, 1861.

The battery was mustered out on July 30, 1865.

== Total strength and casualties ==
Over its existence, the battery carried a total of 333 men on its muster rolls.

The battery lost 33 enlisted men who died of disease, for a total of 33 fatalities.

== Commanders ==
- Captain John H. Dennis

== See also ==
- List of Michigan Civil War Units
- Michigan in the American Civil War
