= 1st Field Artillery Regiment (Belgium) =

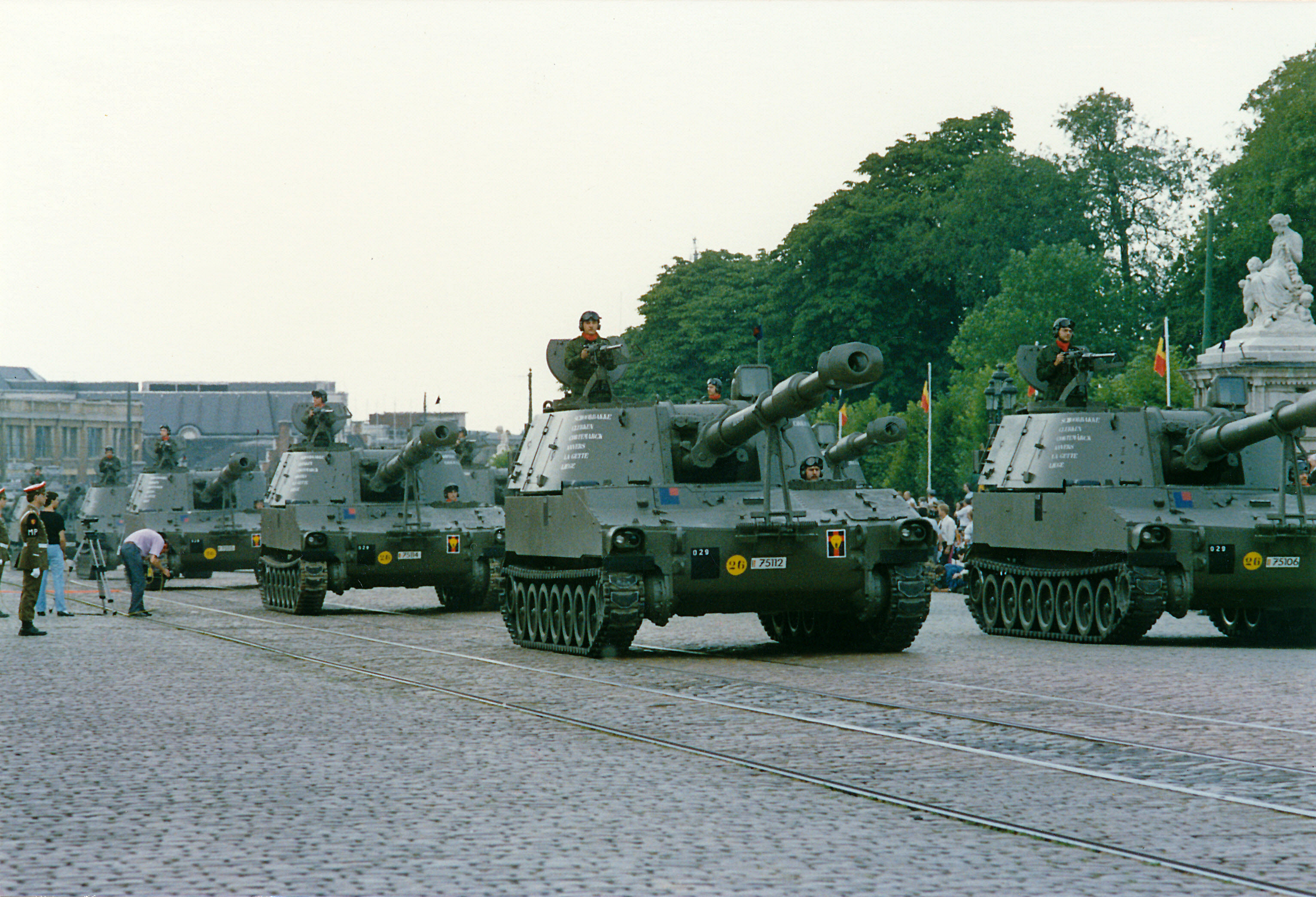
- Active: 21 February 1836 – 4 October 2010
- Country: Belgium
- Branch: Land Component
- Type: Artillery
- Role: Field artillery
- Part of: 7th Brigade
- Garrison/HQ: Bastogne
- Motto: Ubique primus
- Mortar: Mortier 120 RT
- Battles: Battle of Normandy

Commanders
- Current commander: Lieutenant-Colonel Charles Denis

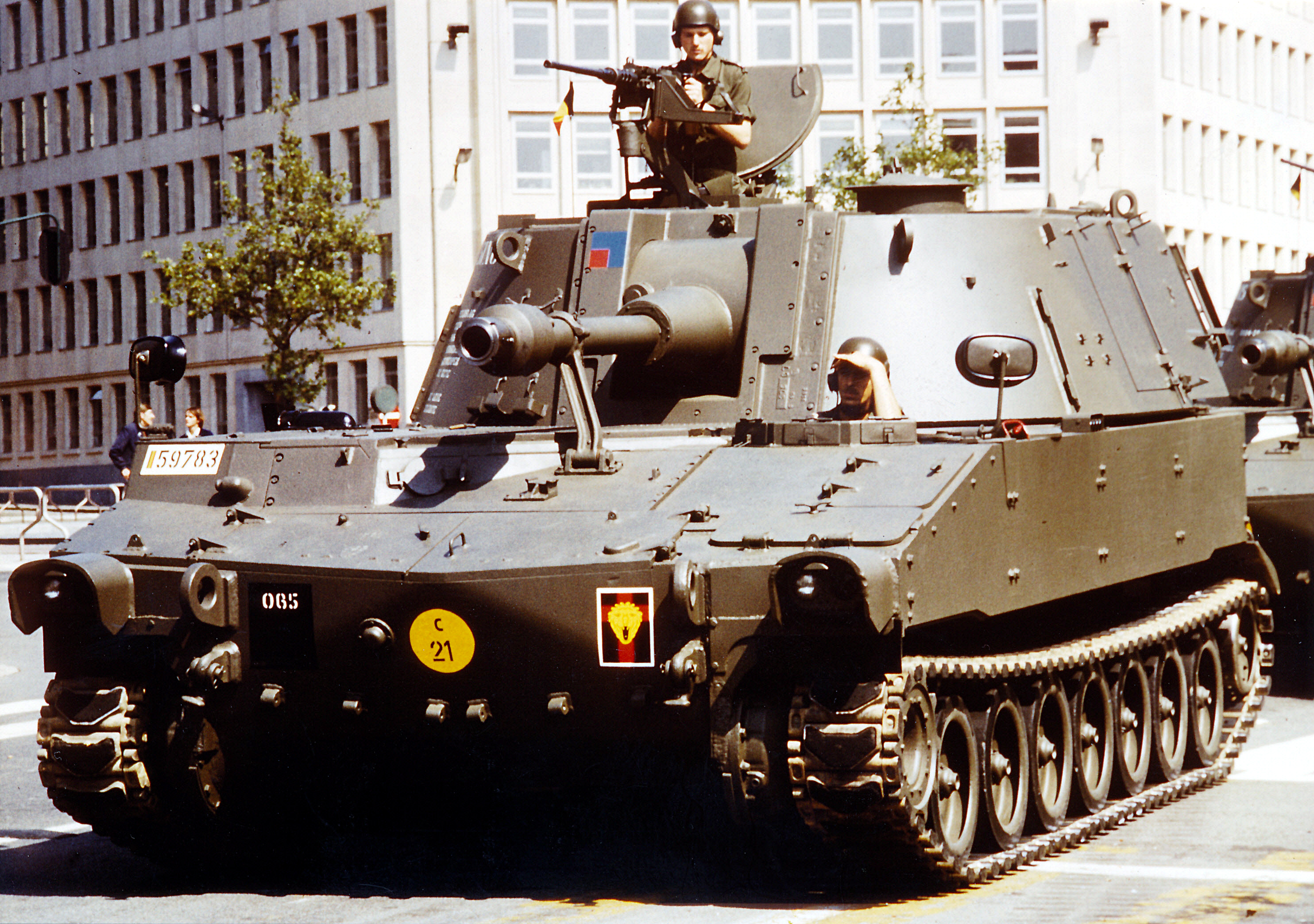
Self-propelled gun M108 of the 1st Field Artillery Regiment participating in the parade of July 21, 1989 in Brussels.

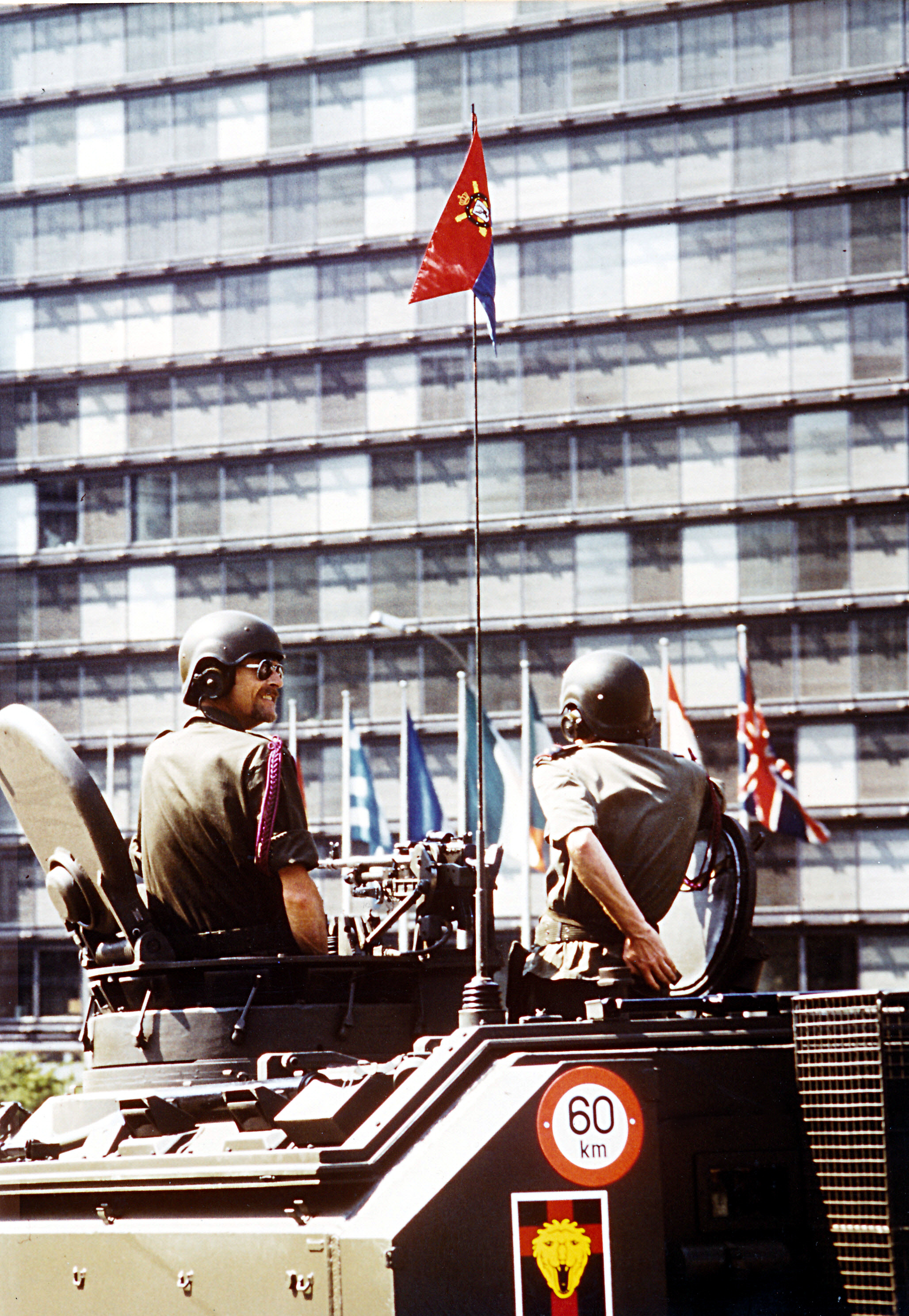
Commander and gunner of an M109A2 self-propelled gun of the 1st Field Artillery Regiment waiting before the parade of July 21, 1989 in Brussels.

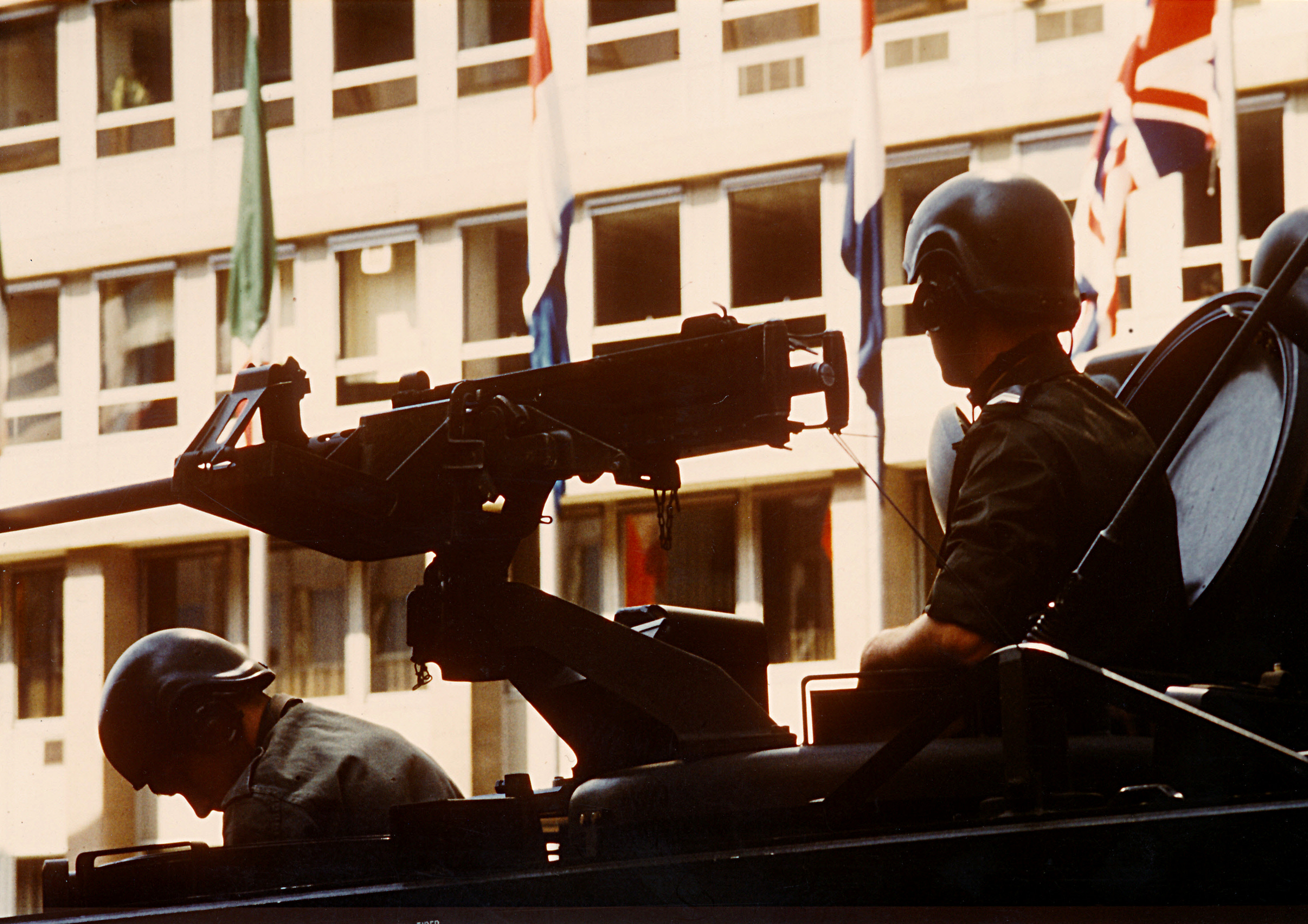
Roof machine gun Browning .50 of the self-propelled gun M109A2.

The 1st Field Artillery Regiment (Dutch: 1ste Regiment Veldartillerie, French: 1 Régiment d'Artillerie de Campagne) or 1A was an artillery battalion in the Land Component of the Belgian Armed Forces. The regiment was the field artillery battalion of the 7th Brigade until 2010.

The unit was stationed in Bastogne and was equipped with the M108 then in the 1980s M109 self-propelled howitzer of 155mm and later the Mortier 12O RT heavy mortar.

== History ==
The 1st Field Artillery Regiment was established on 21 February 1836, when the Regiment of Artillery was split up into three new regiments. The regiment participated in both World Wars. During the Second World War, it remained active after the Eighteen Days' Campaign, the campaign of the Belgian army in May 1940 when Belgium was invaded by Germany. The First Belgian Battery, which was created in the United Kingdom in February 1941, participated as part of the Brigade Piron in the Battle of Normandy and in fights in Belgian and Dutch Limburg during the liberation of Western Europe. For this reason, the regiment's first battery, A Battery, is known as Batterie Libération (French for "Liberation Battery").

== Alliances ==
- France - 1^{er} Régiment d'Artillerie de Marine (1^{er} RAMa)
