= Battery F, 1st Michigan Light Artillery Regiment =

Battery "F" 1st Michigan Light Artillery Regiment
- Michigan state flag
- Active: January 9, 1862 to July 1, 1865
- Country: United States
- Allegiance: Union
- Branch: Artillery
- Engagements: Battle of Nashville

The Battery "F" 1st Michigan Light Artillery Regiment was an artillery battery that served in the Union Army during the American Civil War.

== Service ==
Battery "F" was organized at Detroit and Coldwater, Michigan and mustered into service on January 9, 1862.

The battery was mustered out on July 1, 1865.

== Total strength and casualties ==
Over its existence, the battery carried a total of 246 men on its muster rolls.

The battery lost 1 officer and 9 enlisted men killed in action or mortally wounded and 23 enlisted men who died of disease, for a total of 33 fatalities.

== Commanders ==
- Captain John S. Andrews
- Captain Byron D. Paddock

== See also ==
- List of Michigan Civil War Units
- Michigan in the American Civil War
