= 8th Michigan Cavalry Regiment =

- Michigan state flag
- Active: December 30, 1862, to September 22, 1865
- Country: United States
- Allegiance: Union
- Branch: Cavalry
- Engagements: Battle of Buffington Island; Battle of Nashville

The 8th Michigan Cavalry Regiment was a cavalry regiment that served in the Union Army during the American Civil War.

== Service ==
The 8th Michigan Cavalry was organized at Mt. Clemens, Michigan, between December 30, 1862, and May 2, 1863. Service: Operations against Everett in Eastern Kentucky June 13–23, 1863.

Action at Triplett's Bridge Ky., June 16.

Pursuit of Morgan June 27-July 25.

Buffington Island, Ohio, July 19.

New Lisbon, Ohio, July 22.

Operations against Scott in Eastern Kentucky July 25-August 6.

Lancaster and Paint Lick Bridge July 31-August 1.

Burnside's Campaign in East Tennessee August 16-October 17.

March across Cumberland Mountains to Knoxville, Tenn., August 16-September 2.

Winter's Gap August 31.

Cleveland September 18.

Calhoun, Athens and Charleston September 25.

Calhoun September 26.

Sweetwater October 26–27.

Knoxville Campaign November 4-December 23.

Lenoir Station November 14–15.

Campbell's Station November 16.

Near Knoxville November 16.

Siege of Knoxville November 17-December 5.

Near Bean's Station December 9–13.

Bean's Station December 14.

Blain's Cross Roads December 16–19.

Operations about Dandridge January 16–17, 1864.

Bend of Chucky Road, near Dandridge, January 16.

Dandridge January 17.

Operations about Dandridge January 26–28.

Seviersville and Flat and Muddy Creeks January 26.

Near Fair Garden January 27.

Moved to Knoxville February 3, thence march to Mt. Sterling, Ky., February 6–24, and duty there till June 3.

March to Big Shanty June 3–28.

Spring Place June 25.

Atlanta Campaign June 28-September 8.

Kenesaw Mountain July 1.

Sweetwater July 3.

Chattahoochie River July 6–17.

Dark Corners July 7.

Campbellton July 18.

Stoneman's Raid on Macon July 27-August 6.

Clinton and Macon July 30. Hillsborough, Sunshine Church, July 30–31.

Eatonton August 1.

Regiment refused to surrender with Gen. Stoneman, and cut their way through the rebel lines, but were afterwards surprised at Mulberry Creek and Jug Tavern August 3, and mostly captured.

Picket duty at Turner's Ferry and Marietta till September 14.

Moved to Nicholasville, Ky., September 14–21, and duty there till October 19.

March to Nashville, Tenn., October 19–26; thence moved to Pulaski, Tenn.

Scout to Lawrenceburg November 6, and to Waynesboro November 12.

Nashville Campaign November–December.

Near Eastport November 15.

Henrysville November 23.

Mt. Pleasant November 23.

Duck River November 24–27.

Columbia Ford November 28–29.

Franklin November 30.

Battle of Nashville December 15–16.

Moved to Pulaski January 18, 1865, and engaged in scout and patrol duty in that section till September 29.

Scout from Pulaski to Rogersville, Ala., April 23–26 (Detachment).

The regiment was mustered out of service on September 22, 1865.

== Total strength and casualties ==
The regiment suffered 1 officer and 41 enlisted men killed in action or mortally wounded and 2 officers and 290 enlisted men who died of disease, for a total of 334 fatalities.

== Commanders ==
- Colonel Elisha Mix

== See also ==
- List of Michigan Civil War Units
- Michigan in the American Civil War
