= Battery G, 1st Ohio Light Artillery =

- Active: December 17, 1861 to August 31, 1865
- Country: United States
- Allegiance: Union
- Branch: Artillery
- Equipment: 4 × 6-pdr smoothbores;listed as 6-pdr rifles Wiards at time of Shiloh in Shiloh Shells and Artillery by Witham 2 × 12-pdr Wiard rifles
- Engagements: Battle of Shiloh; Siege of Corinth; Battle of Perryville (detachment); Battle of Stones River; Tullahoma Campaign; Battle of Chickamauga; Siege of Chattanooga; Battle of Missionary Ridge; Battle of Spring Hill; Second Battle of Franklin; Battle of Nashville

Battery G, 1st Ohio Light Artillery was an artillery battery that served in the Union Army during the American Civil War.

== Service ==
The battery was organized at Camp Dennison near Cincinnati, Ohio, and mustered in for a three-year enlistment on December 17, 1861. The regiment was organized as early as 1860 under Ohio's militia laws, under Colonel James Barnett (Joseph Bartlett).

The battery was attached to 5th Division, Army of the Ohio, to June 1862. Artillery Reserve, Army of the Ohio, to September 1862. Artillery, 8th Division, Army of the Ohio, to November 1862. Artillery, 2nd Division, Center, XIV Corps, Army of the Cumberland, to January 1863. Artillery, 2nd Division, XIV Corps, to October 1863. 1st Division, Artillery Reserve, Army of the Cumberland, to March 1864. 2nd Division, Artillery Reserve, Department of the Cumberland, to August 1864. Unattached Artillery, Department of the Cumberland, to October 1864. Artillery Post of Chattanooga, Tennessee, Department of the Cumberland, to November 1864. Artillery Brigade, IV Corps, Army of the Cumberland, to August 1865.

Battery G, 1st Ohio Light Artillery mustered out of service at Camp Chase in Columbus, Ohio, on August 31, 1865.

== Detailed service ==
Moved to Louisville, Ky., February 10, 1862; thence to Nashville, Tenn., February 27. March to Savannah, Tenn., March 18-April 6, 1862. Battle of Shiloh, April 6–7. Advance on and siege of Corinth, Miss., April 29-May 30. Pursuit to Booneville May 31-June 10. Movement to Athens, Ala., June 10–30, and duty there until August. Moved to Nashville, Tenn., August 19. Siege of Nashville September to November. Repulse of Forest's attack on Edgefield November 5. Advance on Murfreesboro, Tenn., December 26–30. Battle of Stones River December 30–31, 1862 and January 1–3, 1863. Duty at Murfreesboro until June. Tullahoma Campaign June 23-July 7. Hoover's Gap June 24–26. Occupation of middle Tennessee until August 16. Passage of Cumberland Mountains and Tennessee River and Chickamauga Campaign August 16-September 22. Davis Cross Roads or Dug Gap September 11. Battle of Chickamauga, September 19–21. Siege of Chattanooga, September 24-November 23. Battle of Chattanooga, November 23–25; Missionary Ridge, November 24–25. Moved to Nashville, Tenn., December 2, and duty there until August 1864. Battery veteranized January 4, 1864. March to relief of Fort Donelson, Tenn., March 3–12. Spring Hill March 9. Rutherford Creek March 10. Duck River March 11. Ordered to join army in the field August 1864. Rousseau's pursuit of Wheeler September 1–8. Lavergne September 1. Franklin September 2. Campbellsville September 5. Expedition after Forest. Pulaski September 26–27. Nashville Campaign November–December. Columbia, Duck River, November 24–27. Spring Hill November 29. Battle of Franklin November 30. Battle of Nashville December 15–16. Pursuit of Hood to the Tennessee River December 17–28. Rutherford Creek December 19. At Huntsville, Ala., until March 1865. Expedition to Bull's Gap and operations in eastern Tennessee March 20-April 5. Duty at Nashville until June. Moved to New Orleans, June 16.

== Casualties ==
The battery lost a total of 33 men during service; 6 enlisted men killed or mortally wounded, 1 officer and 26 enlisted men died of disease.

== Commanders ==
- Captain Alexander Marshall - commanded at the battle of Stones River as a lieutenant

== See also ==
- List of Ohio Civil War units
- Ohio in the Civil War
