= Battery E, 1st Ohio Light Artillery =

- Active: October 7, 1861 to July 10, 1865
- Country: United States
- Allegiance: Union
- Branch: Artillery
- Engagements: Battle of Stones River; Siege of Chattanooga; Battle of Nashville

Battery E, 1st Ohio Light Artillery was an artillery battery that served in the Union Army during the American Civil War.

== Service ==
The battery was organized Camp Dennison near Cincinnati, Ohio and mustered in for a three-year enlistment on October 7, 1861. The regiment was organized as early as 1860 under Ohio's militia laws, under Colonel James Barnett.

The battery was attached to 3rd Division, Army of the Ohio, December 1861 to September 1862. Artillery, 2nd Division, I Corps, Army of the Ohio, to November 1862. 2nd Brigade, 2nd Division, Right Wing, XIV Corps, Army of the Cumberland, to January 1863. Post of Nashville, Tennessee, Department of the Cumberland, to June 1863. Artillery, 2nd Division, Reserve Corps, Army of the Cumberland, to October 1863. Unassigned, Department of the Cumberland, to November 1863. 1st Division, Artillery Reserve, Department of the Cumberland, to December 1863. Garrison Artillery at Bridgeport, Alabama, Department of the Cumberland, to July 1864. 1st Division, Artillery Reserve, Department of the Cumberland, to November 1864. Garrison Artillery, Nashville, Tennessee, Department of the Cumberland, to July 1865.

Battery E, 1st Ohio Light Artillery mustered out of service at Columbus, Ohio on July 10, 1865.

== Detailed service ==
Action at West Liberty, Ky., October 23. Expedition into eastern Ohio and western Virginia after Jenkins' Cavalry November 23–29. Moved to Louisville, Ky., December 2, 1861, thence to Bacon Creek, Ky., and duty there until February 1862. Advance on Bowling Green, Ky., and Nashville, Tenn., February 10–25. Occupation of Nashville February 25. Reconnaissance to Shelbyville and McMinnville March 25–29. Advance on Fayetteville April 4–7, and on Huntsville April 10–11. Capture of Huntsville April 11. Advance on and capture of Decatur, Florence and Tuscumbia April 11–14. Action at West Bridge, near Bridgeport. April 29. Destruction of railroad bridge across the Tennessee River. Relief of 18th Ohio Infantry at Athens May 1 and dispersement of Scott's Forces. Negley's Chattanooga Campaign May 27-June 14. Duty at Battle Creek June–July. Action at Battle Creek June 21. Occupy Fort McCook August 20–25. March to Louisville, Ky., in pursuit of Bragg August 25-September 26. Pursuit of Bragg into Kentucky October 1–15. Lawrenceburg October 6. Dog Walk October 9. March to Nashville, Tenn., October 20-November 7, and duty there until December 26. Reconnaissance from Lavergne November 19. Advance on Murfreesboro December 26–30. Battle of Stones River December 30–31, 1862 and January 1–3, 1863. Battery captured December 31. Ordered to Nashville, Tenn., January 20, 1863 and duty there until September. Moved to Stevenson, Ala., September 6; thence to Battle Creek, Anderson's Cross Roads and Chattanooga. Chattanooga-Ringgold Campaign November 23–27. Battles of Chattanooga November 23–25. Garrison duty at Bridgeport, Ala., until July 1864, and at Nashville, Tenn., until July 1865. Battle of Nashville December 15–16, 1864.

== Casualties ==
The battery lost a total of 32 men during service; 3 enlisted men killed or mortally wounded, 29 enlisted men died of disease.

== Commanders ==
- Captain Warren P. Edgarton
- Lieutenant Frank B. Reckard - commanded at the battle of Nashville

== See also ==
- List of Ohio Civil War units
- Ohio in the Civil War
