= Michigan in the American Civil War =

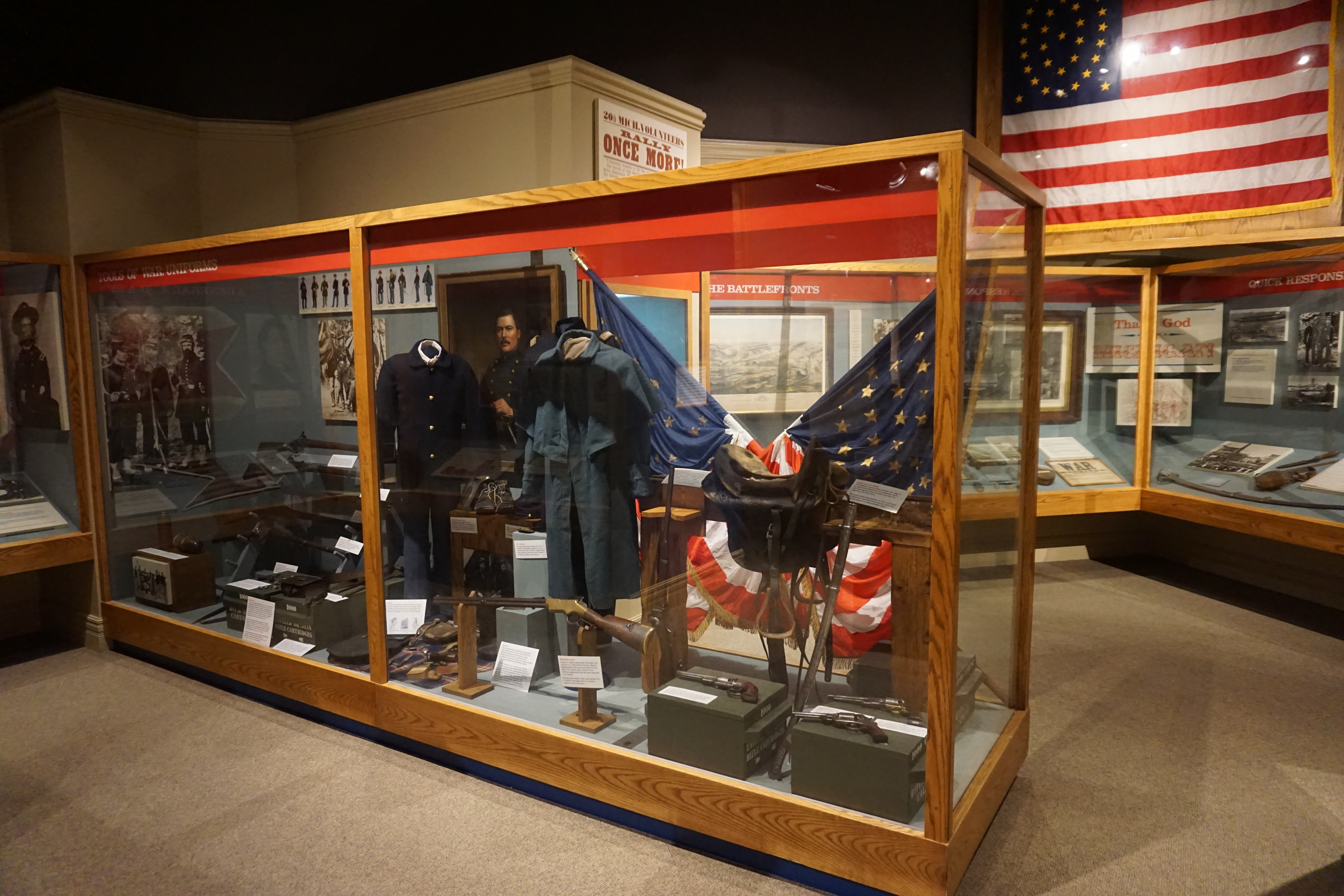
Michigan in the Civil War exhibit in the Michigan History Museum

Michigan made a substantial contribution to the Union during the American Civil War. While the state itself was far removed from the combat theaters of the war, Michigan supplied many troops and several generals. When, at the beginning of the war, Michigan was asked to supply no more than one regiment, Governor Austin Blair sent seven.

== Before the war ==
Before the Civil War, President James Buchanan took a weak position amid a looming South secession crisis. Secretary of State Lewis Cass of Michigan, a 78-year-old elder statesman who had been Michigan's U.S. senator and governor of Michigan Territory, resigned from Buchanan's cabinet in protest, remarking that "he had seen the Constitution born and now feared he was seeing it die".

In December 1860, South Carolina became the first state to secede from the Union. Outgoing Governor Moses Wisner delivered a speech to a Michigan Legislature in defense of the Union and the Constitution, stating: "This is no time for timid and vacillating councils, when the cry of treason and rebellion is ringing in our ears." On January 2, 1861, Austin Blair was sworn in as governor, vowing strong action to maintain the Union and punish secession. The legislature was also firmly pro-Union; when Virginia invited Michigan to send delegates to the Washington Peace Conference, the Legislature passed a refusal resolution stating that "concessions and compromise are not to be entertained or offered to traitors."

== Military contribution ==
At the beginning of the Civil War, regiments from Michigan were raised to answer Lincoln's call for men. The first volunteers from Michigan were mustered into the Army as the 1st Michigan Infantry on May 1, 1861. On May 16, the regiment arrived in Washington; Lincoln was said to have exclaimed "Thank God for Michigan!" upon the troops' arrival.

Over the course of the war, some 90,000 Michigan men (about 23 percent of the 1860 male population of the state) served in the Union forces. This figure includes some 1,600 black soldiers. Michigan raised a total of 30 infantry regiments, the 102nd United States Colored Infantry Regiment, formally the 1st Michigan Colored Infantry Regiment, eleven cavalry regiments, three companies in the 2nd Missouri Cavalry Regiment, also known as Merrill’s Horse, one light artillery regiment, two light batteries, the 1st Michigan Sharpshooters Regiment, three other companies of sharpshooters, as well as three companies in the 1st United States Sharpshooters, one in the 2nd United States Sharpshooters, one in the 66th Illinois Infantry Regiment also known as the Western Sharpshooters, an independent sharpshooter battalion, and the 1st Michigan Engineers. According to Frederick H. Dyer, a total of 14,753 officers and men from Michigan died during the war, but a "Roll of Honor" prepared upon order of the Michigan Legislature in 1869 contains 14,855 names.

Among the more celebrated units was the 24th Michigan Volunteer Infantry, which, as a part of the famed Iron Brigade, suffered considerable losses at the Battle of Gettysburg while defending McPherson's Ridge. George Armstrong Custer's "Michigan Wolverine" Cavalry effectively battled J.E.B. Stuart at Gettysburg on the East Cavalry Field.

Several Union generals hailed from Michigan, including: Custer, Elon J. Farnsworth, Byron Root Pierce, Orlando Metcalfe Poe, Israel Bush Richardson, and Orlando B. Willcox. In a letter to his wife, one Union soldier from Michigan detailed his motivations for fighting for the U.S. in the war, before dying in 1864:

The more I learn of the cursed institution of slavery, the more I feel willing to endure, for its final destruction ... After this war is over, this whole country will undergo a change for the better ... Abolishing slavery will dignify labor; that fact of itself will revolutionize everything ... Let Christians use all their influence to have justice done to the black man.

== Casualties ==
Ah! yes, many a hand that vigorously grasped these Flagstaffs and led the van, now lies crumbling in the grave; and not color-bearers alone, but nearly 15,000 others who fought beside them—the flower of Michigan—return not to receive your thanks and the plaudits of their grateful countrymen.

— General O. B. Willcox, Presentation of Civil War Flags to the State, July 4, 1866

14,753 Michigan soldiers died in service, roughly one of every six who served. A total of 4,448 of these deaths were combat deaths while the rest, over 10,000, were from disease, a constant fear in crowded army camps with poor food, sanitation and exposure issues and pre-modern medicine. Michigan suffered the sixth-highest losses among the Union states (the non-state U.S. Colored Troops losses also exceeded Michigan's).

== Homefront ==
Michigan actively participated in the American Civil War sending thousands of volunteers. A study of the cities of Grand Rapids and Niles shows an overwhelming surge of nationalism in 1861, whipping up enthusiasm for the war in all segments of society, and all political, religious, ethnic, and occupational groups. However, by 1862 the casualties were mounting and the war was increasingly focused on freeing the slaves in addition to preserving the Union. Copperhead Democrats called the war a failure, and although it was attempted to make support for the war more and more a partisan Republican effort, the election of 1864 showed support for the Federal cause remained strong. Michigan voters overwhelmingly supported the Union: 79,149 (53.60%) to 68,513 (46.40%).

== See also ==
- List of Michigan Civil War Units
- History of Michigan
