= Battle of Island Number Ten order of battle: Union =

The following Union Army and Union Navy units and commanders fought in the Battle of Island Number Ten during the American Civil War.

== Abbreviations used ==
=== Military rank ===
- MG = Major General
- BG = Brigadier General
- Col = Colonel
- Ltc = Lieutenant Colonel
- Maj = Major
- Cpt = Captain
- Lt = Lieutenant

=== Other ===
- w = wounded
- mw = mortally wounded
- k = killed

== Army of the Mississippi ==
Major General John Pope

- Assistant Adjutant General: Maj Speed Butler
- Assistant Inspector General: Maj John M. Corse
- Siege Train: Cpt Joseph A. Mower
- Medical Director: Surgeon O. W. Nixon

Division	Brigade	Regiments and Others
1st Division; BG David S. Stanley	1st Brigade Col John Groesbeck; 2k, 5w, 0m = 7	27th Ohio: Col John W. Fuller; 39th Ohio: Maj Edward Follansbee Noyes
1st Division; BG David S. Stanley	2nd Brigade Col J. L. Kirby Smith; 0k, 5w, 0m = 5	43rd Ohio: Maj Wager Swayne; 63rd Ohio: Col John W. Sprague; 60th Illinois: Col Silas C. Toler
2nd Division; BG Schuyler Hamilton	1st Brigade Col William H. Worthington; 2k, 4w, 0m = 6	59th Indiana: Col Jesse I. Alexander; 5th Iowa: Ltc Charles L. Matthies
2nd Division; BG Schuyler Hamilton	2nd Brigade Col Miklós Perczel; 0k, 0w, 0m = 0	10th Iowa: Ltc William E. Small; 26th Missouri: Col George B. Boomer
2nd Division; BG Schuyler Hamilton	Artillery 1k, 0w, 0m = 1	11th Battery, Ohio Light Artillery: Cpt Frank C. Sands
3rd Division; BG John M. Palmer	1st Brigade Col James R. Slack; 0k, 0w, 0m = 0	34th Indiana: Col Townsend Ryan; 47th Indiana: Ltc Milton S. Robinson
3rd Division; BG John M. Palmer	2nd Brigade Col Graham N. Fitch; 0k, 0w, 0m = 0	43rd Indiana: Col William E. McLean; 46th Indiana: Ltc Newton G. Scott
3rd Division; BG John M. Palmer	Cavalry 0k, 1w, 2m = 3	7th Illinois Cavalry: Col William P. Kellogg
4th Division; BG Eleazar A. Paine	1st Brigade Col James D. Morgan; 1k, 1w, 0m = 2	10th Illinois: Ltc John Tillson; 16th Illinois: Col Robert F. Smith
4th Division; BG Eleazar A. Paine	2nd Brigade Col Gilbert W. Cumming; 0k, 0w, 0m = 0	22nd Illinois: Ltc Harrison E. Hart; 51st Illinois: Ltc Luther P. Bradley
4th Division; BG Eleazar A. Paine	Cavalry Maj D.P. Jenkins; 0k, 0w, 0m = 0	Company H, 1st Illinois Cavalry; Company I, 1st Illinois Cavalry
4th Division; BG Eleazar A. Paine	Sharpshooters 0k, 0w, 0m = 0	64th Illinois: Maj F. W. Matteson
5th Division; BG Joseph B. Plummer	1st Brigade Col John Bryner; 0k, 0w, 0m = 0	47th Illinois: Ltc Daniel L. Miles; 8th Wisconsin: Ltc George W. Robbins
5th Division; BG Joseph B. Plummer	2nd Brigade Col John M. Loomis; 0k, 0w, 0m = 0	26th Illinois: Ltc Charles J. Tinkham; 11th Missouri: Ltc William E. Panabacker
5th Division; BG Joseph B. Plummer	Artillery 0k, 0w, 0m = 0	Battery M, 1st Missouri: Cpt Albert M. Powell
Reporting directly	Cavalry Division BG Gordon Granger; 0k, 1w, 2m = 3	2nd Michigan Cavalry: Ltc Seldon H. Gorham; 3rd Michigan Cavalry: Ltc Robert H. G. Minty
Reporting directly	Artillery Division Maj Warren L. Lathrop; 1k, 0w, 0m = 1	2nd Battery Iowa Artillery: Cpt Nelson T. Spoor; 5th Battery, Wisconsin Artillery: Cpt Oscar F. Pinney; 6th Battery, Wisconsin Artillery: Cpt Henry Dillon; 7th Battery, Wisconsin Artillery: Cpt Richard R. Griffiths; Battery C, 1st Michigan Artillery: Cpt A. W. Dees; Battery H, 1st Michigan Artillery: Cpt Samuel DeGolyer; Battery C, 1st Illinois Artillery: Cpt Charles Houghtaling; Battery F, 2nd U.S. Artillery: Lt John Darling
Reporting directly	Unattached	Bissell's Engineer Regiment of the West: Col Josiah Bissell; 22nd Missouri Infantry Regiment: Ltc John D. Foster; 2nd Iowa Cavalry Regiment: Col Washington L. Elliott; 2nd Illinois Cavalry (4 companies): Ltc Harvey Hogg; 4th U.S. Cavalry (3 companies): Ltc M. J. Kelly; 1st U.S. Infantry (6 companies): Cpt George A. Williams
Reporting directly	Flotilla Brigade Col Napoleon B. Buford	27th Illinois: Ltc Fazilo A. Harrington; 42nd Illinois: Col George W. Roberts; 15th Wisconsin: Col Hans C. Heg; Battery G, 2nd Illinois Light Artillery:Cpt Frederick Sparrestrom; Battery G, 1st Regiment Illinois Volunteer Light Artillery: Cpt Arthur O'Leary

== Union Navy Western Flotilla ==
Flag Officer Andrew H. Foote
17k, 34w, 3m = 54

Vessels
USS Benton

Lt Commander Seth L. Phelps

USS Mound City

Commander Augustus H. Kilty

USS Carondelet

Commander Henry Walke

USS Cincinnati

Commander Roger N. Stembel

USS St. Louis (later USS Baron De Kalb)

Lt Leonard Paulding

USS Pittsburg

Lt Egbert Thompson
