= Savannah campaign order of battle: Union =

The following Union Army units and commanders fought in the Savannah campaign (or Sherman's March to the Sea) of the American Civil War. The Confederate order of battle is listed separately. Order of battle compiled from the army organization during the campaign.

== Abbreviations used ==
=== Military rank ===
- MG = Major General
- BG = Brigadier General
- Col = Colonel
- Ltc = Lieutenant Colonel
- Maj = Major
- Cpt = Captain
- Lt = 1st Lieutenant
- Bvt = Brevet

== Union Forces ==
MG William T. Sherman, Commanding

Headquarters guard:

- 7th Company Ohio Sharpshooters: Lt James Cox

Engineers:

- 1st Missouri Engineers (5 companies): Ltc William Tweeddale

== Right Wing (Army of the Tennessee) ==
MG Oliver O. Howard
Escort:

- Company K, 15th Illinois Cavalry: Lt John A. McQueen
- 4th Company Ohio Cavalry: Cpt John L. King

=== XV Corps ===
MG Peter J. Osterhaus

| Division | Brigade | Regiments and Others |
|---|---|---|
| First Division; BG Charles R. Woods | 1st Brigade Col Milo Smith | 12th Indiana: Maj Elbert D. Baldwin; 26th Iowa: Maj John Lubbers; 27th Missouri: Col Thomas Curley; 29th Missouri: Ltc Joseph S. Gage; 31st Missouri/32nd Missouri Battalion: Ltc Abraham J. Seay; 76th Ohio: Col William B. Woods |
| First Division; BG Charles R. Woods | 2nd Brigade BG Charles C. Walcutt (w), Col Robert F. Catterson | 26th Illinois: Cpt George H. Reed; 40th Illinois: Ltc Hiram W. Hall; 103rd Illinois: Maj Asias Willison; 97th Indiana: Col Robert F. Catterson, Cpt George Elliott; 100th Indiana: Maj Ruel M. Johnson; 6th Iowa: Ltc William H. Clune; 46th Ohio: Ltc Isaac N. Alexander |
| First Division; BG Charles R. Woods | 3rd Brigade Col James A. Williamson | 4th Iowa: Ltc Samuel D. Nichols; 9th Iowa: Cpt Paul McSweeney; 25th Iowa: Col George A. Stone; 30th Iowa: Ltc Aurelius Roberts; 31st Iowa: Ltc Jeremiah W. Jenkins |
| Second Division; MG William Babcock Hazen | 1st Brigade Col Theodore Jones | 55th Illinois: Cpt Charles A. Andress; 116th Illinois: Ltc John E. Maddux; 127th Illinois: Cpt Charles Schryver; 6th Missouri: Ltc Delos Van Deusen; 8th Missouri, (two companies): Cpt John W. White; 30th Ohio: Cpt Emory W. Muenscher; 57th Ohio: Maj John McClure |
| Second Division; MG William Babcock Hazen | 2nd Brigade Col Wells S. Jones (w), Col James Stewart Martin | 111th Illinois: Col James Stewart Martin, Maj William M. Mabry; 83rd Indiana: Ltc George H. Scott; 47th Ohio: Col Augustus C. Parry; 53rd Ohio: Cpt David H. Lasley; 54th Ohio: Ltc Israel T. Moore |
| Second Division; MG William Babcock Hazen | 3rd Brigade BG John Morrison Oliver | 48th Illinois: Maj Edward Adams; 90th Illinois: Ltc Owen Stuart; 99th Indiana: Ltc John M. Berkey; 15th Michigan: Ltc Frederick S. Hutchinson; 70th Ohio: Ltc Henry L. Philips |
| 3rd Division; Bvt MG John E. Smith | 1st Brigade Col Joseph B. McCown | 63rd Illinois: Ltc James Isaminger; 93rd Illinois: Ltc Nicholas C. Buswell; 48th Indiana: Ltc Edward J. Wood; 59th Indiana: Ltc Jefferson K. Scott; 4th Minnesota: Col John Eaton Tourtellotte |
| 3rd Division; Bvt MG John E. Smith | 2nd Brigade Bvt. BG Green B. Raum | 56th Illinois: Cpt James P. Files; 10th Iowa: Ltc Paris P. Henderson; 26th Missouri: Col Benjamin D. Dean; 80th Ohio: Ltc Pren Metham |
| 4th Division; BG John M. Corse | 1st Brigade BG Elliott W. Rice | 52nd Illinois: Maj Wesley Boyd, Ltc Jerome D. Davis; 66th Indiana: Ltc Roger Martin; 2nd Iowa: Col Noel B. Howard; 7th Iowa: Ltc James C. Parrott |
| 4th Division; BG John M. Corse | 2nd Brigade Col Robert N. Adams | 12th Illinois: Ltc Henry Van Sellar; 66th Illinois: Ltc Andrew K. Campbell; 81st Ohio: Maj William C. Henry |
| 4th Division; BG John M. Corse | 3rd Brigade Col Frederick J. Hurlbut | 7th Illinois: Ltc Hector Perrin; 50th Illinois: Cpt Henry Horn; 57th Illinois: Maj Frederick A. Battey; 39th Iowa: Ltc Joseph M. Griffiths |
| Artillery Maj Charles J. Stolbrand | | Battery H, 1st Illinois Light: Cpt Francis DeGress; Battery B, 1st Michigan Light: Cpt Albert F. R. Arndt; Battery H, 1st Missouri Light: Lt John F. Brunner; 12th Wisconsin Light Battery: Cpt William Zickerick |

=== XVII Corps ===
MG Francis Preston Blair Jr.
Escort:

- Company G, 11th Illinois Cavalry: Cpt Stephen S. Tripp

| Division | Brigade | Regiments and Others |
|---|---|---|
| First Division; MG Joseph A. Mower | 1st Brigade BG John W. Fuller | 64th Illinois: Cpt Joseph S. Reynolds; 18th Missouri: Ltc Charles S. Sheldon; 27th Ohio: Cpt James Morgan; 39th Ohio: Cpt Daniel Weber |
| First Division; MG Joseph A. Mower | 2nd Brigade BG John W. Sprague | 35th New Jersey: Col John J. Cladek; 43rd Ohio: Col Wager Swayne; 63rd Ohio: Maj John W. Fouts; 25th Wisconsin: Ltc Jeremiah McLain Rusk |
| First Division; MG Joseph A. Mower | 3rd Brigade Col John Tillson | 10th Illinois: Ltc McLain F. Wood; 25th Indiana: Maj James S. Wright; 32nd Wisconsin: Col Charles H. De Groat |
| Second Division BG Mortimer Dormer Leggett | Provost Guard | 20th Illinois: Cpt Henry King |
| Second Division BG Mortimer Dormer Leggett | 1st Brigade BG Manning F. Force | 30th Illinois: Ltc William C. Rhoades; 31st Illinois: Ltc Robert N. Pearson; 45th Illinois: Maj John O. Duer; 12th Wisconsin: Ltc James Kerr Proudfit; 16th Wisconsin: Maj William F. Dawes |
| Second Division BG Mortimer Dormer Leggett | 2nd Brigade Col Robert Kingston Scott | 20th Ohio: Cpt Lyman N. Ayres; 68th Ohio: Ltc George E. Welles; 78th Ohio: Col Greenbury F. Wiles; 17th Wisconsin: Maj Patrick H. McCauley |
| Third Division; BG Giles Alexander Smith | 1st Brigade Col Benjamin F. Potts | 14th Illinois (battalion)/15th Illinois: Lt Alonzo J. Gillespie; 41st Illinois (battalion): Maj Robert H. McFadden; 53rd Illinois: Col John W. McClanahan; 23rd Indiana: Col George S. Babbitt; 53rd Indiana: Cpt Henry Duncan; 32nd Ohio: Ltc Jefferson J. Hibbets |
| Third Division; BG Giles Alexander Smith | 3rd Brigade BG William W. Belknap | 32nd Illinois: Maj Henry Davidson; 11th Iowa: Cpt Benjamin Beach; 13th Iowa: Cpt Justin C. Kennedy; 15th Iowa: Maj George Pomutz; 16th Iowa: Cpt Crandall W. Williams |
| Artillery Maj Allen C. Waterhouse | | Battery C, 1st Michigan Light: Lt Henry Shier; 1st Minnesota Light Battery: Lt Henry Hurter; 15th Ohio Light Battery: Lt George R. Caspar |

== Left Wing (Army of Georgia) ==
MG Henry W. Slocum

Pontoniers:

- 58th Indiana: Col George P. Buell

=== XIV Corps ===
Bvt MG Jefferson C. Davis

| Division | Brigade | Regiments and Others |
|---|---|---|
| First Division; BG William P. Carlin | 1st Brigade Col Harrison C. Hobart | 104th Illinois: Ltc Douglas Hapeman; 42nd Indiana: Cpt Gideon R. Kellams; 88th Indiana: Ltc Cyrus E. Briant; 33rd Ohio: Cpt Joseph Hinson; 94th Ohio: Ltc Rue P. Hutchins; 21st Wisconsin: Ltc Michael H. Fitch |
| First Division; BG William P. Carlin | 2nd Brigade Ltc Joseph H. Brigham | 13th Michigan: Ltc Theodoric R. Palmer; 21st Michigan: Maj Benton D. Fox; 69th Ohio: Cpt Lewis El Hicks |
| First Division; BG William P. Carlin | 3rd Brigade Col Henry A. Hambright, Ltc David Miles | 38th Indiana: Cpt James H. Low; 21st Ohio: Ltc Arnold McMahan; 74th Ohio: Maj Joseph Fisher, Maj Robert P. Findley; 79th Pennsylvania: Ltc David Miles, Maj Michael H. Locher |
| 2nd Division; BG James D. Morgan | 1st Brigade Col Robert F. Smith | 16th Illinois: Ltc James B. Cahill; 60th Illinois: Col William B. Anderson; 10th Michigan: Col Charles M. Lum; 14th Michigan: Maj Thomas C. Fitzgibbon; 17th New York: Ltc Joel O. Martin |
| 2nd Division; BG James D. Morgan | 2nd Brigade Ltc John S. Pearce | 34th Illinois: Cpt Peter Ege; 78th Illinois: Ltc Maris R. Vernon; 98th Ohio: Cpt James R. McLaughlin; 108th Ohio: Maj Frederick Beck; 113th Ohio: Cpt Toland Jones; 121st Ohio: Maj Aaron B. Robinson |
| 2nd Division; BG James D. Morgan | 3rd Brigade Ltc James W. Langley | 85th Illinois: Maj Robert G. Rider; 86th Illinois: Ltc Allen R. Fahnestock; 110th Illinois (four companies), Ltc E. Hibbard Topping; 125th Illinois: Cpt George W. Cook; 22nd Indiana: Cpt William H. Snodgrass; 37th Indiana (1 company): Lt Socrates Carver; 52nd Ohio: Ltc Charles W. Clancy |
| 3rd Division; BG Absalom Baird | 1st Brigade Col Morton C. Hunter | 82nd Indiana: Ltc John M. Matheny; 23rd Missouri: Ltc Quin Morton; 17th Ohio: Ltc Benjamin H. Showers; 31st Ohio: Cpt Michael Stone; 89th Ohio: Ltc William H. Glenn; 92nd Ohio: Col Benjamin D. Fearing |
| 3rd Division; BG Absalom Baird | 2nd Brigade Col Newell Gleason | 75th Indiana: Maj Cyrus J. McCole; 87th Indiana: Ltc Edwin P. Hammond; 101st Indiana: Ltc Thomas Doan; 2nd Minnesota: Ltc Judson W. Bishop; 105th Ohio: Ltc George T. Perkins |
| 3rd Division; BG Absalom Baird | 3rd Brigade Col George P. Este | 74th Indiana: Ltc Thomas Morgan; 18th Kentucky: Ltc Hubbard K. Milward; 14th Ohio: Ltc Albert Moore; 38th Ohio: Cpt Charles M. Gilbert |
| 3rd Division; BG Absalom Baird | Artillery Maj Charles Houghtaling | Battery C, 1st Illinois Light: Lt Joseph R. Channel; Battery I, 2nd Illinois Light: Lt Alonzo W. Coe; 19th Indiana Light Battery: Cpt William P. Stackhouse; 5th Wisconsin Light Battery: Lt Joseph McKnight |

=== XX Corps ===
BG Alpheus S. Williams

| Division | Brigade | Regiments and Others |
|---|---|---|
| First Division; BG Nathaniel J. Jackson | 1st Brigade BG James L. Selfridge | 5th Connecticut: Ltc Henry W. Daboll; 123rd New York: Ltc James C. Rogers; 141st New York: Cpt William Merrell; 46th Pennsylvania: Maj Patrick Griffith |
| First Division; BG Nathaniel J. Jackson | 2nd Brigade Col Ezra A. Carman | 2nd Massachusetts: Col William Cogswell; 13th New Jersey: Maj Frederick H. Harris; 107th New York: Cpt Charles J. Fox, Ltc Allen N. Sill; 150th New York: Maj Alfred B. Smith; 3rd Wisconsin: Col William Hawley |
| First Division; BG Nathaniel J. Jackson | 3rd Brigade Col James S. Robinson | 82nd Illinois: Maj Ferdinand H. Rolshausen; 101st Illinois: Ltc John B. LeSage; 143rd New York: Ltc Hezekiah Watkins; 61st Ohio: Cpt John Garrett; 82nd Ohio: Ltc David Thomson; 31st Wisconsin: Col Francis H. West |
| Second Division; BG John W. Geary | 1st Brigade Col Ario Pardee Jr. | 5th Ohio: Ltc Robert Kirkup; 29th Ohio: Maj Myron T. Wright; 66th Ohio: Ltc Eugene Powell; 28th Pennsylvania: Col John H. Flynn; 147th Pennsylvania: Ltc John Craig |
| Second Division; BG John W. Geary | 2nd Brigade Col Patrick Henry Jones | 33rd New Jersey: Col George W. Mindil; 119th New York: Col John T. Lockman; 134th New York: Ltc Allan H. Jackson; 154th New York: Maj Lewis D. Warner; 73rd Pennsylvania: Maj Charles C. Cresson |
| Second Division; BG John W. Geary | 3rd Brigade Col Henry A. Barnum | 60th New York: Maj Thomas Elliott; 102nd New York: Ltc Harvey S. Chatfield; 137th New York: Ltc Koert S. Van Voorhees; 149th New York: Maj Nicholas Grumbach; 29th Pennsylvania: Col Samuel M. Zulich; 111th Pennsylvania: Col Thomas M. Walker |
| Third Division; BG William Thomas Ward | 1st Brigade Col Franklin C. Smith | 102nd Illinois: Maj Hiland H. Clay; 105th Illinois: Maj Henry D. Brown; 129th Illinois: Col Henry Case; 70th Indiana: Ltc Samuel Merrill; 79th Ohio: Ltc Azariah W. Doan |
| Third Division; BG William Thomas Ward | 2nd Brigade Col Daniel Dustin | 33rd Indiana: Ltc James E. Burton; 85th Indiana: Ltc Alexander B. Crane; 19th Michigan: Ltc John J. Baker; 22nd Wisconsin: Ltc Edward Bloodgood |
| Third Division; BG William Thomas Ward | 3rd Brigade Col Samuel Ross | 20th Connecticut: Ltc Philo B. Buckingham; 33rd Massachusetts: Ltc Elisha Doane; 136th New York: Ltc Lester B. Faulkner; 55th Ohio: Ltc Edwin H. Powers; 73rd Ohio: Ltc Samuel H. Hurst; 26th Wisconsin: Ltc Frederick C. Winkler |
| Third Division; BG William Thomas Ward | Artillery Maj John A. Reynolds | Battery I, 1st New York Light: Cpt Charles E. Winegar; Battery M, 1st New York Light: Cpt Edward P. Newkirk; Battery C, 1st Ohio Light : Cpt Marco B. Gary, Lt Jerome B. Stephens; Battery E, Pennsylvania Light: Cpt Thomas S. Sloan |

=== Cavalry Corps ===
| Division | Brigade | Regiments and Others |
|---|---|---|
| Third Division; BG Hugh Judson Kilpatrick | 1st Brigade Colo Eli H. Murray | 8th Indiana Cavalry: Ltc Fielder A. Jones; 2nd Kentucky Cavalry: Cpt Joseph T. Forman, Cpt Robert M. Gilmore; 3rd Kentucky Cavalry: Ltc Robert H. King; 5th Kentucky Cavalry: Col Oliver L. Baldwin; 9th Pennsylvania Cavalry: Col Thomas J. Jordan |
| Third Division; BG Hugh Judson Kilpatrick | 2nd Brigade Col Smith D. Atkins | 92nd Illinois Mounted Infantry: Ltc Matthew Van Buskirk; 3rd Indiana Cavalry: Cpt Charles U. Patton; 9th Michigan Cavalry: Col George S. Acker; 5th Ohio Cavalry: Col Thomas T. Heath; 9th Ohio Cavalry: Col William D. Hamilton; 10th Ohio Cavalry: Lt Thomas W. Sanderson; McLaughlin's Squadron (Ohio): Cpt John Dalzell |
| Third Division; BG Hugh Judson Kilpatrick | Unattached | 1st Alabama Cavalry: Col George E. Spencer; 9th Illinois Mounted Infantry: Ltc Samuel T. Hughes |
| Third Division; BG Hugh Judson Kilpatrick | Artillery | 10th Wisconsin Battery: Cpt Yates V. Beebe |

== See also ==
- Georgia in the American Civil War
