= 10th Illinois Infantry Regiment =

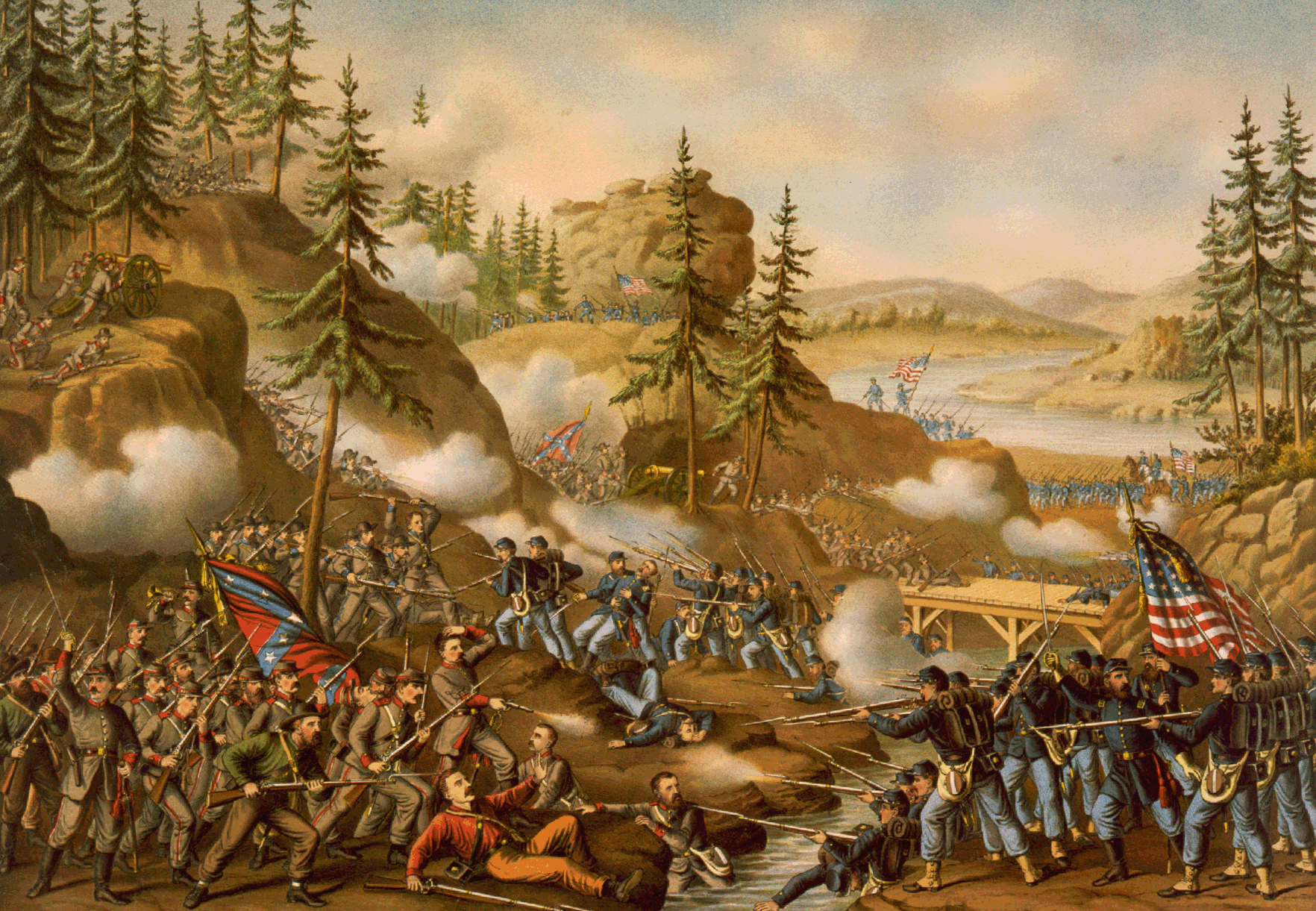
- Battle of Chattanooga
- Active: April 20, 1861–July 11, 1865
- Disbanded: July 11, 1865
- Country: United States
- Allegiance: Union
- Branch: Infantry
- Size: Regiment
- Nickname: The Twins (Note: "The Twins" nickname is in association with the 16th Regiment due to campaigning together.)
- Engagements: American Civil War: Battle of Missionary Ridge; Battle of Kennesaw Mountain; Siege of Atlanta; Battle of Jonesborough; March to the Sea; Battle of Bentonville

Commanders
- Colonel: James D. Morgan
- Colonel: John Tillson

The 10th Illinois Infantry Regiment was an infantry regiment that served in the Union Army between April 20, 1861, and July 11, 1865, during the American Civil War.

== Service ==
=== Initial 3 month service ===
The Tenth Illinois Volunteer Infantry was one of the six Regiments called for by the Governor Yates's order of Tuesday, April 16, 1861. The infantry regiment was organized at Springfield, Illinois, from the first four companies reporting on April 20, 1861. They were ordered to Cairo, Illinois, on April 22 where it became fully organized by an additional three companies, three artillery companies and mustered in for a three-month service by Captain John Pope, United States Army, on April 29, 1861. Armed with a mix of imported Enfield and various Springfield Model 1855 and Model 1861 rifle-muskets, it went into service clad in militia gray with gray broad-rimmed hats. The governor appointed Benjamin Mayberry Prentiss as Colonel, James D. Morgan, as Lieutenant Colonel, and Charles H. Adams as Major. The early promotion of Prentiss to a Brigadier General made Morgan Colonel, Adams Lieutenant Colonel and John Tillson Major. Thus organized, it remained at Cairo, doing garrison duty, during its three months' service; twice making movements of reconnaissance, one toward Columbus, KY, and again to Benton, MO. They were attached to Prentiss' Brigade on garrison duty at Cairo, Illinois until being mustered out on July 29, 1861.

=== 3 year service enlistment and Pope's operations ===
It enlisted and was mustered into the three years' service, July 29, 1861, by Captain T. G. Pitcher at Cairo; thence was soon removed to Mound City, IL, where it remained through the winter, taking part in January 1862, in the movement of Grant's forces toward Columbus and Paducah. In February it was stationed at Bird's Point, MO, and while there, March 1, had brisk engagement with Rebel cavalry, near Sikeston, MO, taking several prisoners and two field pieces.

In March, the 10th Illinois was attached to General Pope's Army of the Mississippi (AoM), (Note: This army, the first to carry this name, stood up on Sunday, February 23, with Pope in command. Initially only having two divisions of infantry, on Pope's advance toward New Madrid, it expanded with units from neighboring military districts to five divisions commanded respectively by David S. Stanley, Schuyler Hamilton, John M. Palmer, Eleazar A. Paine and Joseph B. Plummer. Gordon Granger commanded the Cavalry Division of two regiments and Napoleon B. Buford commanded the "Flotilla Brigade") in a brigade composed of the 10th, 16th (its "Twin", under Colonel Smith), and a battalion (under Lt. Col. Williams) of 64th Illinois Infantry regiments. As the senior colonel, Morgan took command of the brigade with command of the regiment passing to Tillson. It became the 1st Brigade in Paine's 4th Division.

Island Number Ten, a small island at the (Tennessee) base of a tight double turn in the Mississippi river, was taken by the Rebels early in the war providing a major impediment to any U. S. efforts to regain control of the Confederacy by river, as ships had to approach the island bows on and then slow to make the turns. Its innate weakness was a single road for supplies and reinforcements. If U.S. forces cut that road, the garrison would be isolated and eventually be forced to surrender.

Pope began his siege in March 1862, shortly after the Confederate Army abandoned their position at Columbus, Kentucky. He made the first probes, coming overland through Missouri and occupying the town of Point Pleasant, Missouri, almost directly west of the island and south of New Madrid. Pope's army then moved north and soon brought siege guns to bear on New Madrid on Wednesday, March 12.

In a night movement, that night, the 10th Illinois in the 1st Brigade advanced on New Madrid, driving in the enemy's pickets, establishing earthworks and planting four field pieces commanding the rebel forts, without raising alarm until daylight, when Pope's artiullery opened fire. Throughout Thursday, the regiment held position under fire of the Rebels' two forts and five gunboats. During the day, it made sorties in which lost one Captain (Carr of Co. H,) and two men killed. The Confederate commander, Brig. Gen. John P. McCown, decided to evacuate the town after only one day of heavy bombardment, moving most of his troops to Island No. 10, abandoning his heavy artillery and most of his supplies.

Following the loss of New Madrid, some of the units at the bend were withdrawn to Fort Pillow, not quite 70 mi (110 km) as the crow flies to the south, but almost twice that by the river. The U.S. Navy's The gunboats under Flag Officer Andrew H. Foote gunboats and mortars arrived on March 15. (Note: These vessels were not ready to cooperate with the AoM earlier, as the damages they had received at Fort Donelson were still being repaired. They were finally sent down from Cairo on March 14, with Foote yet believing that they were not ready for combat. The Union fleet was augmented by the addition of 14 mortar rafts, vessels that each mounted a single 13 in (330 mm) mortar.) The 10th Illinois and the AoM, in New Madrid, and the naval forces, upstream of the bend, were kept apart by Island No. 10. Pope wanted immediate action against the island while Foote hoped to subdue the island by the slow process of bombardment. As early as March 17, Pope was asking that two or three gunboats run past the Confederate batteries, to enable him to cross the river and trap the entire garrison. (Note: At this time, Pope's army did not have the transports that would be needed to cross.) Foote demurred, arguing that his boats were not invincible, that a chance disabling shot would deliver a boat into Confederate hands, and that gunboat could then threaten all the Northern cities along the Mississippi and its tributaries. (Note: Foote's thinking may also have been affected by the wound he had received at Fort Donelson, which was not healing properly and kept him in pain and on crutches.)

For the next two weeks, fighting consisted of bombardment of the island at rather long range, mostly conducted by the mortars, and occasionally replied to by the Confederate batteries. After Foote had flatly rejected Pope's request that gunboats run past Island No. 10, someone on Pope's staff suggested that perhaps a canal could be cut to enable Union vessels to bypass the batteries. Completed in two weeks, while not deep enough to provide passage for the gunboats, it was deep enough for transports and supply vessels, so that Pope did not have to depend on land communications. When Halleck told Foote, to, "Give him (Pope) all the assistance in your power," Foote gathered his officers on March 29, and the USS Carondelet was prepared for the run and waited for a sufficiently dark night to make her run.

To reduce the danger as much as possible, a raid by sailors and soldiers overran Battery No. 1 and spiked its guns on Tuesday night, April 1. On Wednesday, the flotilla, including both mortars and gunboats, concentrated its fire on the Rebel's floating battery New Orleans, knocking her out of action sending her drifting downstream out of the war. On Friday night. April 4, conditions for the run were satisfactory with a moonless night and a thunderstorm. Carondelet took off and was not discovered until she was abreast of the Confederate Battery No. 2 which opened up to no effect, and Carondelet completed the run unscathed. Pope asked Foote for another gunboat, and on Sunday night, April 6,USS Pittsburg made a similar run. (Note: This was also the first day of the far bloodier Battle of Shiloh)

Now able to cross the river without interference from Confederate gunboats, Pope could also suppress enemy fire that may have opposed their landing. On Monday, he made his move, and sent the gunboats to destroy the batteries at Watson's Landing, his landing site, and once this was accomplished, the transports carried the troops across, and the landings proceeded without opposition. The 10th Illinois landed in the first wave.

A few hours elapsed until Mackall, the Rebel commander, realized that his position was hopeless, he put the men on the mainland in motion in the direction of Tiptonville. The motion was detected, and Pope then diverted his soldiers to Tiptonville. The 10th Illinois and its comrades found themselves in a footrace rather than the expected battle. The U.S. Navy's gunboats delayed the Rebels long enough for thwe 10th Illinois and its brigade to intercept their retreat, bringing to surrender at Tiptonville Mackall with 2,500 men. While this was taking place, the demoralized garrison of Island No. 10 surrendered separately to Flag Officer Foote and his gunboats. In total, 6,000 men and a large amount of field artillery and small arms were captured and the Mississippi was open as far as Fort Pillow.

On Sunday, April 13, the 10th Illinois embarked on a steamer for Forts Wright and Pillow; returned up Mississippi on Friday, and landed at Hamburg on the Tennessee, Thursday, April 24.

=== Siege of Corinth ===
Following the victories at Island Number Ten and Shiloh, Halleck united the three U.S. armies —the Army of the Tennessee (AoT), the Army of the Ohio (AoO), and the AoM — to advance on the vital rail center of Corinth, Mississippi. Cautious due to staggering losses at Shiloh, his advance was a slow campaign of offensive entrenchment, fortifying after each advance. Hallack organized his force into two wings, a center, and a reserve. The right wing was commanded by Grant in his capacity of District of West Tennessee commander with the AoT providing the Right Wing (five divisions under Thomas) and Halleck's reserves (two divisions under McClernand). The center was buell's AoO (with four divisions). The AoM, under Pope, made up the left wing. Pope further organized his troops into two further wings (of two and three divisions) keeping his cavalry division, Reserve Brigade, Artillery Brigade, a Regular Cavalry regiment, a Regular Infantry regiment, and a regiment of Missouri Engineers as direct reports.

On April 24, the 10th Illinois' brigade was assigned to the new 2nd Brigade of Paine's new 1st Division in the two-division Right Wing commanded initially by Pope who then assigned it to Rosecrans. (Note: The Left wing, with the 3rd, 4th, and 5th Divisions was commanded by Hamilton) Col. Morgan assumed command of the brigade until May 1, when Brig. Gen. Daniel Tyler took command. The brigade now had six volunteer infantry regiments, four Illinois and two Michigan. Joining the 10th and its twin, the 16th Illinois were the 60th Illinois (under Col. Toler), Yates' Sharpshooters, and the 10th and 14th Michigan.

Of Halleck's wing commanders Pope proved to be the most aggressive during the campaign. Pope led the army's Left Wing and was furthest away from Halleck's headquarters. On May 3, Pope moved forward. He had Paine leave his camp about 10:00 a.m. and take the road to Farmington. After advancing 3 miles (4.8 km), Paine sent a detachment towards Nichols' ford, and the 10th Illinois and the balance of the division descended into Four Mile Swamp on either side of the direct road to Farmington with Yates' sharpshooters being deployed as skirmishers. The skirmishers soon made contact and, reinforced by the 10th Illinois and the rest of its brigade, succeeded in forcing passage through the swamp, driving the Rebels across Seven-Mile Creek. In this action, the regiment lost two men killed and five wounded, capturing 15 Rebels, and killing an equal number.

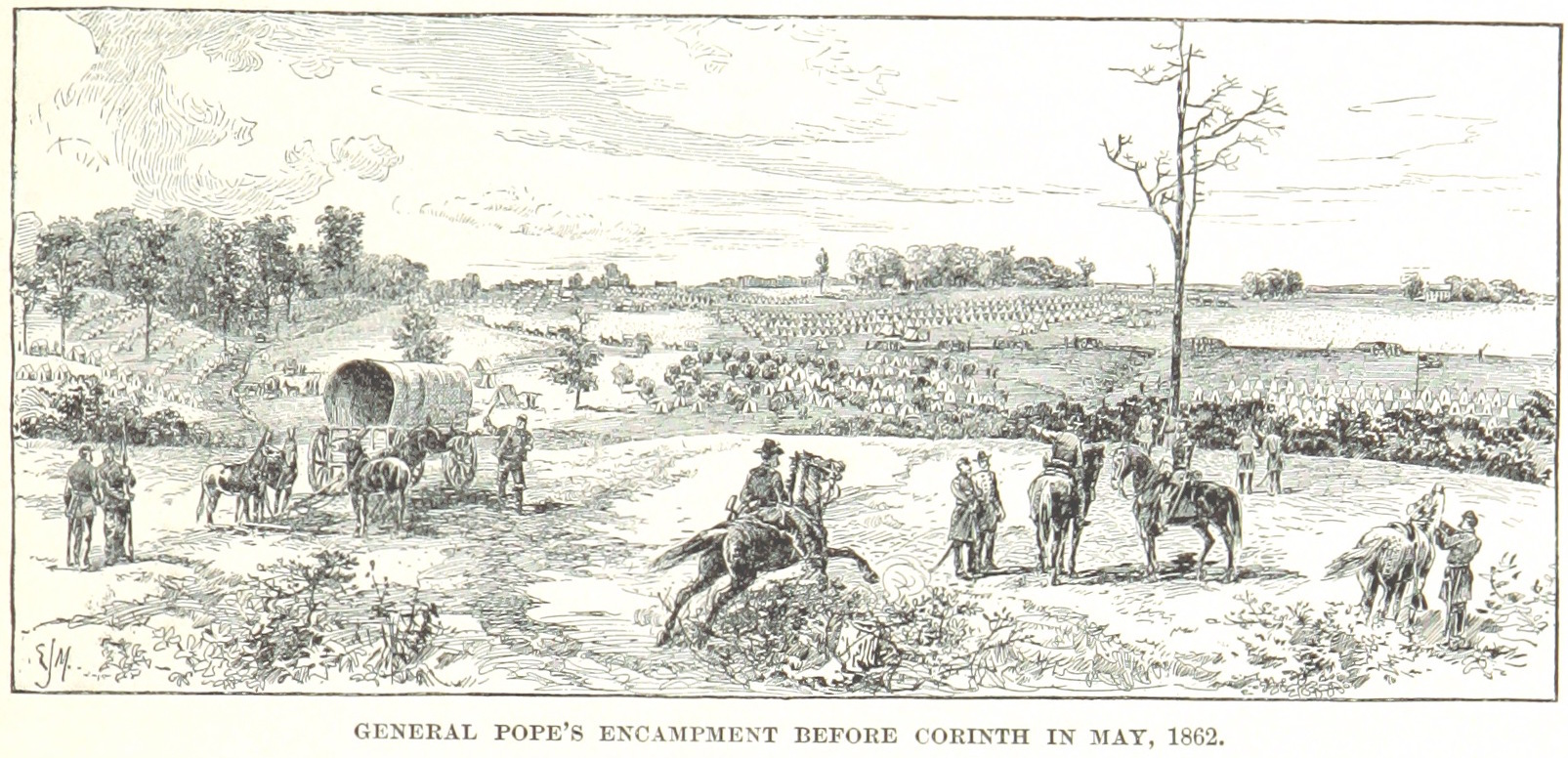
Pope's encampment at Corinth

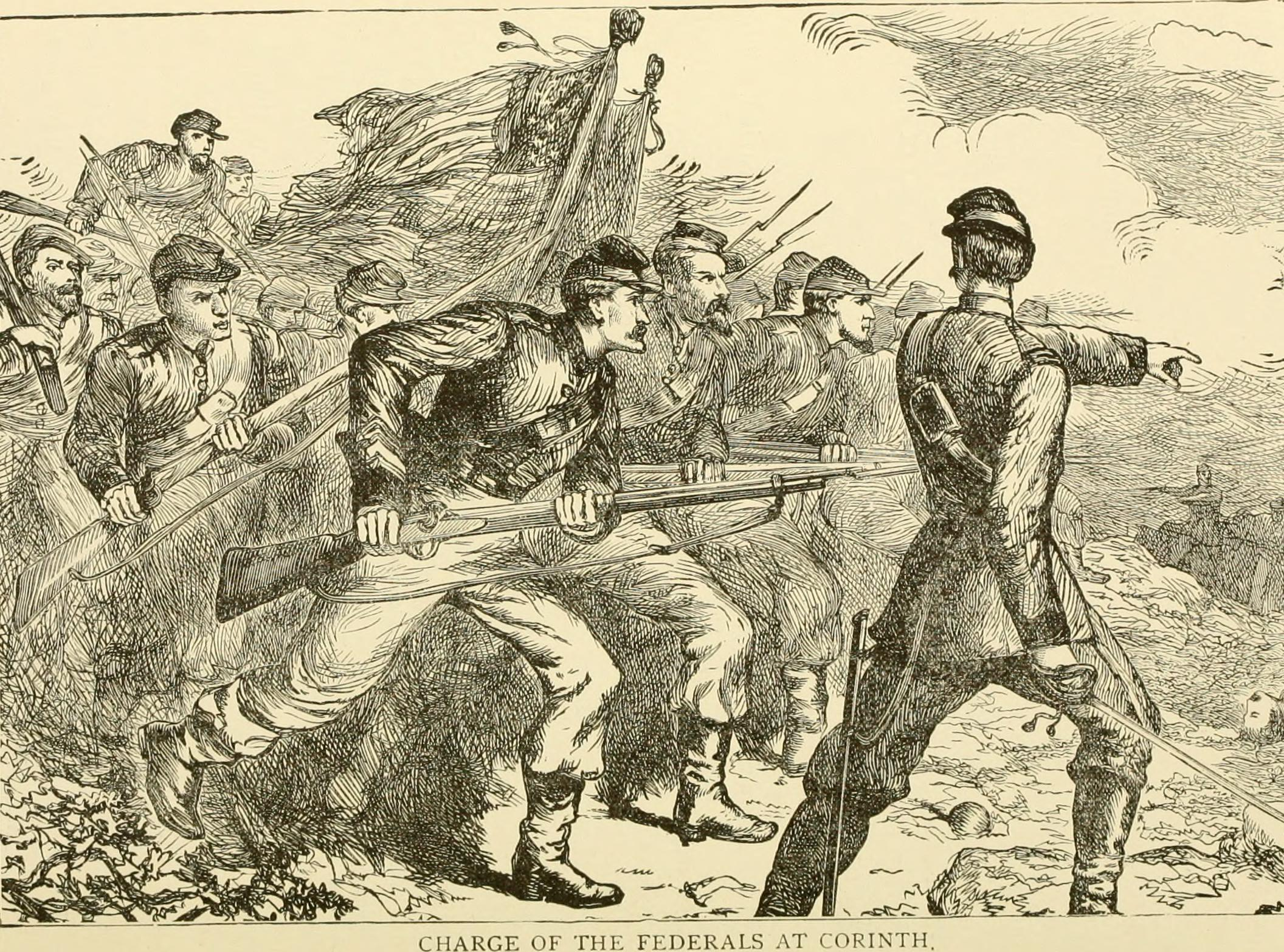
Charge of the Federals

After this advance, instead of moving the center wing under Buell forward, Halleck ordered Pope to withdraw and realign with Buell. Almost a week later, on Friday, May 9, Beauregard ordered Van Dorn and Bragg to attack Pope, as the 10th Illinois successfully withdrew as part of Pope's realignment with Buell. Pope's 12,000 men were barely engaged by Van Dorn's corps, who barely engaged, had 9 casualties while Bragg's Corp, which bore the brunt of the fighting, suffered casualties of 8 dead, 89 wounded and two missing or captured. Halleck's total losses were 16 killed, 148 wounded and 14 missing or captured.

Over the next two weeks, Halleck's wings continued to advance on and around Corinth. By Sunday, May 25, after moving 5 miles (8.0 km) in three weeks, Halleck was in position to lay siege to the town. On Tuesday, Halleck sent Sherman to drive the Confederates from Double Log House along the Corinth Road and Buell to clear the Rebels off the Surratt Hill. The nnext day, May 27, Buell had sent a force who seize a Confederate-held crossing of Bridge Creek, a small tributary of the Tuscumbia River, forcing the Rebels to abandon the bridge completely.k

Beauregard's army had low morale, faced twice their number, and were racked by typhoid and dysentery. At a council of war, the Confederate officers concluded that they could not hold the railroad crossover. Sickness had claimed the lives of as many men as the Confederacy had lost at Shiloh. Beuregard decided to retreat and save his army by faking preparations for an assault while during Friday night, May 29, his army evacuated, (Note: He used the Mobile and Ohio Railroad to carry the sick and wounded, the heavy artillery, and tons of supplies. When a train arrived, the troops cheered as though reinforcements were arriving. They set up dummy Quaker guns along the defensive earthworks. Camp fires were kept burning, and buglers and drummers played.) withdrawing to Tupelo, Mississippi. When the 10th Illinois entered Corinth on Saturday morning, the men and their brethren in the U.S. armies realized enemy had gone. (Note: The Union forces took control and made it the base for their operations to seize control of the Mississippi River valley, and especially the Confederate stronghold of Vicksburg, Mississippi.) The 10th and its brigade spent the next week and a half pursuing the enemy as far as Booneville, returning toward Corinth and encamping at Big Springs on Thursday, June 12.

=== Post-Corinth and Nashville garrison duty ===
The 10th Illinois remained in camp outside Corinth for the next five and a half weeks at Big Springs during the month of June, and until Monday, July 21. On that day, the 10th Illinois marched to Tuscumbia. Changes in the regiment's command structure were afoot on Thursday, July 17, Col. Morgan was promoted to brigadier general. As a result, Lt. Col. Tillotson was promoted to colonel and fleeted up to command the 10th Illinois. The next week Company A's Capt McLean Wood was promoted two ranks to assume the lieutenant colonelcy. Company E's commander Capt.Charles Cowan was promoted to Major. The 10th Illinois saw the resignation of its chaplain, Rev. William Collins of Jacksonville, IL, on Saturday, June 21 while encamped at Big Springs.

Successful U.S. Army operations in the Western campaigns had made progress largely driving organized Rebels from Kentucky and large parts of Tennessee. The Tennessee and Cumberland Rivers were opened to the U.S. Navy. Corinth's evacuation caused most of West Tennessee to fall into federal control. Admiral David Farragut had taken New Orleans, the Confederacy's largest city, leaving Vicksburg, Mississippi in WAashington's sights with western Confederacy were "narrowed down all to the single line of [rail]road running east from Vicksburg." To shift attention away from Vicksburg and from Chattanooga, Tennessee, the Rebels invaded Kentucky with Bragg leading its army. (Note: Kentucky, the most southern of the southern border states, produced cotton (in west Kentucky) and tobacco on large scale plantations similar to Virginia and North Carolina in the central and western portions of the state with slave labor, and was the primary supplier of hemp for rope used in the cotton industry. The state was also a major slave trade center especially out of Louisville.) With Kentucky, being a slave state, the "brother against brother" scenario was prevalent. Unable to gain an electoral majority, Southern sympathizers seceded and joined the Confederacy, nominally controlling more than half the state early in the war, but they had been unable to establish their legitimacy after early 1862. Despite Kentucky's declared neutrality at the beginning of the war, the Confederacy confidently seized Columbus in 1861, a political blunder that pushed the legislature to petition the U.S. forces for assistance overriding the Kentucky governor's veto. After early 1862 Kentucky was largely under Union control, despite having a star on the Confederacy's flags and seats in its congress. (Note: In addition, many Confederate leaders, including John C. Breckinridge, were from Kentucky. (Note: Jefferson Davis was born in Kentucky and grew up in Mississippi.) Abraham Lincoln was also born in Kentucky, living there until age seven and growing up in Illinois. Most of Mary Todd Lincoln's relatives from the Lexington, Kentucky area were Confederate officers.) While 35,000 Kentuckians served as Confederate soldiers, an estimated 125,000 Kentuckians served as Union soldiers. Nearly sixty infantry regiments served in the Union armies, versus just nine in the Confederate. As a result, Bragg, like Lee in his Maryland Campaign, expected to rally supporters and recruits and draw U. S. forces under Buell back beyond the Ohio River. Bragg moved his army to Chattanooga to challenge Buell's advance on the city.

On Thursday, August 28, the 10th Illinois and its brigade received orders to go to Nashville to join the garrison there to counter the Rebel move north. On Saturday morning the 10th Illinois and its comrades moved out marching via Florence, Athens and Columbia, to Nashville; had five men killed by guerrillas on the march. The force reached Nashville, Friday, September 12, remaining there most of time until July 1863, with occasional movements in the neighborhood. At this time the brigade became 2nd Brigade, 13th Division, Army of the Ohio (AoO).

On October 4, Bragg participated in the inauguration of Richard Hawes as the provisional Confederate governor of Kentucky. The wing of Bragg's army under Polk met Buell's army at Perryville on Wednesday, October 8, and won a tactical victory against him. Despite entreaties from his subordinates to continue with his ivasion, Bragg displayed "a perplexity and vacillation which had now become simply appalling to Smith, to Hardee, and to Polk." In the end, fearing the growing numbers moving on him, Bragg withdrew through Cumberland Gap, claiming his invasion was a successful giant raid. Disheartening news had arrived from North Mississippi that Earl Van Dorn and Sterling Price had failed at Corinth, just as Lee had failed in his Maryland.

Despite, Bragg's withdrawal, regular and irregular Rebel cavalry remained active in Kentucky and Tennessee. Morgan's regular cavalry was particularly active, launching multiple raids and strikes on Rosecrans' supply lines feeding the AoC Nashville. On Monday, October 24, William Rosecrans relieved Buell as commander of the AoO and also appointed to the command of the Department of the Cumberland and subsequently renamed his forces the Army of the Cumberland (AoC). Rosecrans was promoted to the rank of major general (of volunteers, as opposed to his brigadier rank in the regular army). and began re-organizing his army. (Note: The promotion was applied retroactive to March 21, 1862, so that he would outrank fellow Maj. Gen. Thomas; Thomas had earlier been offered Buell's command, but turned down the opportunity out of a sense of personal loyalty. Grant was not unhappy that Rosecrans was leaving his command.) Despite Buell's halting and lackluster pursuit of Bragg causing his relief, Rosecrans displayed similar caution, remaining in Nashville while he reprovisioned his army and improved the training of his cavalry forces. In November, the 10th was assigned to the 1st Brigade, 4th Division, Centre (under Thomas XIV Corps, AoC. On Wednesday, November 5, the 10th Illinois suffered two men killed in the rebuff Morgan's attack on the Edgefield Railroad Bridge. By early December 1862, Halleck had lost his patience and wrote to Rosecrans, "If you remain one more week in Nashville, I cannot prevent your removal." Rosecrans replied, "I need no other stimulus to make me do my duty than the knowledge of what it is. To threats of removal or the like I must be permitted to say that I am insensible."

In late December, Rosecrans began his march against Bragg, encamped outside Murfreesboro, Tennessee leaving the 4th and 5th Divisions and most of the 3rd behind to securte Nashville. The 10th Illinois, therefore, missed the Battle of Stones River, the bloodiest battle of the war in terms of percentages of casualties.

=== The new year, Tullahoma, and Chattanooga ===
After the battle, Rosecrans reorganized the AoC again. The former Center wing became XIV Corps, the Right wing became XX Corps, and the Left wing became XXI Corps. Rosecrans retained the 4th and 5th Divisions to keep his lines of communications open.

Following Stones River, Bragg had withdrawn along the Duck River behind the ridge known as the Highland Rim, which encircles the Nashville Basin. Bragg, concerned that Rosecrans would seize Chattanooga, a vital rail junction and the gateway to northern Georgia, spread his cavalry over a wide front to guard against a turning movement. Bragg assumed any attack would be made on his left flank through the easy-to-cross Guy's Gap towards Shelbyville, so he placed the larger of his two infantry corps commanded by Polk there. Hardee's corps was 8 miles (13 km) to Polk's right, in Wartrace, protecting the main Chattanooga road and positioned to reinforce the other three passes —(from west to east) Bell Buckle Gap, Liberty Gap, and Hoover's Gap. Hoover's Gap was almost undefended; it was a 4 miles (6.4 km) long pass between the 1,100 feet (340 m) ridges separating the Stones and Duck Rivers. The narrow pass had been fortified with strong entrenchments but only manned by a single cavalry regiment.

Rosecrans remained building, supplying, and training the AoC in Murfreesboro for almost six months, building a logistical base (Fortress Rosecrans). In the face of numerous entreaties from Washington to resume campaigning against Bragg, Rosecrans rebuffed them through the winter and spring because he was reluctant to advance on the muddy winter roads. The fear that the Rebels might move units from Bragg's army to relieve the pressure that Grant was applying to Vicksburg, Mississippi. Frustration with Rosecrans's excuses led Halleck to threaten to relieve him if he did not move, but in the end he merely protested "against the expense to which [Rosecrans] put the government for telegrams."

During the winter and spring, both sides occupied themselves with their favorite—and generally profitless—practice of sending cavalry on raids. Almost a third of Bragg's army consisted of cavalry—16,000 effectives versus about 9,000 Union. A number of minor battles - the Battle of Dover, the Battle of Thompson's Station, the Battle of Brentwood, the cavalry fights north of Spring Hill, and Streight's Raid - served to keep the 10th Illinois and the 4th Division in Nashville. These efforts while tying down AoC assets cost Bragg 4,000 irreplaceable cavalrymen during this period and 3,300 U.S. soldiers. At this time, the 4th Division of XIV Corps was transferred to the AoC's Reserve Corps as its 2nd Division mid-June, putting the 10th IllinoisA 1st Brigade, 2nd Division of the Reserve Corps until October.

With the threat of losing troops to support Grant, Rosecrans, after consulting his subordinates, planned his offensive to launch at the end of June. (Note: Meanwhile, Brig. Gen. John Hunt Morgan's Confederate cavalry brigade had been detached from Bragg's army, and was, at this time, moving north in preparation of the imminent launch of his famous Great Raid into Kentucky, Indiana and Ohio - an operation that cavalry historian Stephen Z. Starr called "militarily insane", and that would ultimately end in Morgan's capture.) On June 16, Halleck wired a blunt message: "Is it your intention to make an immediate movement forward? A definite answer, yes or no, is required." Rosecrans responded to this ultimatum: "If immediate means tonight or tomorrow, no. If it means as soon as all things are ready, say five days, yes." Seven days later, early in the morning of June 24, Rosecrans reported that the Army of the Cumberland had begun to move against Bragg.

The campaign was marked by the AoC's first large-scale use of mounted infantry armed with repeating rifles. The speed of the mounted infantry let Rosecran's army take Hoover's Gap and flank Bragg much sooner than he expected. As a result, Bragg evacuated his forces from Middle Tennessee and withdrew to the city of Chattanooga, Tennessee. Rosecrans followed and, through skillful manoeuver and misdirection, (Note: While crossing the Tennessee River with the bulk of his army downstream and westsouthwest of the city, Rosecrans had sent a small force of infantry, mounted infantry, cavalry, and artillery (including Wilder's Lightning Brigade) across the Cumberland Plateau to make demonstrations of an assault directly on the city to hold Bragg there.) captured that city on Tuesday, September 8, 1863, when Bragg realized the bulk of the AoC had gotten beyond his left flank and withdrew south along the LaFayette Road toward LaFayette, Georgia. The AoC occupied Chattanooga on Wednesday, and Rosecrans telegraphed Halleck, "Chattanooga is ours without a struggle and East Tennessee is free." Maneuvering then continued in the Chickamauga Campaign. Rosecrans was frustrated that the victory at Hoover's Gap and the Tullahoma Campaign were overshadowed by two other Union victories in the summer of 1863, the Siege of Vicksburg and Battle of Gettysburg.

All the while the 4th Division remained guarding the AoC's lines of supply and communication with the 10th Illinois spending most of its tenure posted at the aforementioned Edgefield Railroad Bridge. Finally, on Monday, July 20, the 10th Illinois' 4h Division marched to the AoC supply base at Murfreesboro. The next day, the men received word that their first commander, Col. Morgan had been promoted to Brigadier General. It remained there five weeks until Monday, August 24, when it marched south to Bridgeport, AL, where a key bridge across the Tennessee River fed the Memphis and Charleston (M&C) to meet the Nashville and Chattanooga (N&C), the East Tennessee and Georgia (ET&G), and the East Tennessee and Virginia (ET&V) at the rail hub of Chattanooga. The regiment arrived there, the Saturday after Chattanooga's fall, September 12, meeting its twin and brigade mates there.

=== Chickamauga campaign ===
After his successful Tullahoma Campaign, Rosecrans now held Chattanooga, the vital rail hub and important manufacturing center, severing the rail link between the northwestern ans northgeastern Confederacy which he immediately turned into a logistical depot. Rosecrans was convinced that Bragg was demoralized and fleeing to either Dalton, Rome, or Atlanta, Georgia. Instead, the Army of Tennessee had stopped its retreat at LaFayette, 20 miles (32 km) south of Chattanooga. Confederate soldiers who posed as deserters deliberately added to this impression.

Rosecrans knew that he would have difficulty receiving supplies in his pursuit of Bragg and began accumulating supplies and transport wagons in Chattanooga. Pushing further south meant long distances without a reliable line of communications. Since the AoC had no permanent bridges across the river to supply it reliably, a bridge was constructed at Bridgeport by Sheridan's division, spanning 2,700 feet (820 m) in three days. The 10th Illinois' brigade's arrival September 12, freed the remainder of the army to begin its pursuit through the rugged, mountainous terrain and road networks that were just as treacherous as the ones they had already traversed. Members of the 10th Illinois were impressed as they watched the rest of the AoC cross the river and pass through the gaps in the mountains to the south, writing, "Can one name a spot on the round globe so fit for the circumstance and pomp of war?."

Thomas firmly cautioned Rosecrans that a pursuit of Bragg was unwise because the AoC was too widely dispersed due to separation from the mountains between the gaps, and its vulnerable supply lines. Rosecrans discounted Thomas's advice, ordering McCook to swing across Lookout Mountain at Winston's Gap and use his cavalry to break Bragg's railroad supply line at Resaca, Georgia, Crittenden was to move south from Chattanooga in pursuit of Bragg, and Thomas to continue his advance toward LaFayette. His subordinate generals were generally supportive of thte advance but counseled delay.

Bragg was aware of Rosecrans's dispositions and planned to defeat him by attacking his isolated corps individually. The corps were spread out over 40 miles (64 km), too far apart to support each other. Meanwhile, the Confederate government decided to attempt a strategic reversal in the West by sending Bragg reinforcements from Virginia—Lt. Gen. James Longstreet with two divisions from his First Corps, Army of Northern Virginia—in addition to the reinforcements from Mississippi. Chickamauga was the first large scale Confederate movement of troops from one theater to another with the aim of achieving a period of numerical superiority and gaining decisive results. Bragg was now more satisfied with the resources provided, and looked to strike the Union Army as soon as he achieved the strength he needed.

While the 10th Illinois remained at Bridgeport, the Rebels moved north. (Note: Morgan had fleeted up to commanding the 22nd Division of the AoC's Reserve Corps at Bridgeport.) Contact occurred at Davis's Cross Roads. On September 17, Bragg headed north, intending to attack the isolated XXI Corps, and, the next day, made contact with U.S. cavalry and mounted infantry, which were armed with repeating rifles and carbinest at Alexander's and Reed's Bridges across West Chickamauga Creek. Heavy combat took place Saturday, September 19, but the Rebels could not break the U.S. line. On Sunday, Bragg resumed his assault, and through misinformation, Rosecrans erred creating a gap directly in the path of an eight-brigade assault on a narrow front by Longstreet's eastern veterans resulting in a rout that drove one-third of the AoC, including Rosecrans himself, from the field. U.S. Army units spontaneously rallied in a defensive line on Horseshoe Ridge ("Snodgrass Hill"), under Thomas, who assumed overall command of remaining forces, rebuffing numerous costly and determined Confederate assaults until twilight. Starting about 4:30 p.m., Thomas began pulling his troops back to Chattanooga just as Bragg committed his last reserves to the battle. (Note: Longstreet later wrote that there were 25 assaults in all on Snodgrass Hill, but historian Glenn Tucker has written that it was "really one of sustained duration". At that same time Thomas received an order from Rosecrans to take command of the army and began a general retreat. Thomas's divisions at Kelly field, starting with Reynolds's division, were the first to withdraw, followed by Palmer's.) Thomas left Horseshoe Ridge, placing Granger in charge, but Granger departed soon thereafter, leaving no one to coordinate the withdrawal. Eventually all divisions managed to escape due to the sacrifice of three regiments—the 22nd Michigan, the 21st Ohio, and the 89th Ohio Infantry regiments—who were left behind without sufficient ammunition, and ordered to use their bayonets. They held their position until surrounded by Rebels, when they were forced to surrender.

AoC forces then retired to Chattanooga while the Confederates occupied the surrounding heights, besieging the city. (Note: The battle was damaging to both sides in proportions roughly equal to the size of the armies: Union losses were 16,170 (1,657 killed, 9,756 wounded, and 4,757 captured or missing), Confederate 18,454 (2,312 killed, 14,674 wounded, and 1,468 captured or missing). They were the highest losses of any battle in the Western Theater during the war and, after Gettysburg, the second-highest of the war overall. Although the Confederates were technically the victors, Bragg failed to destroy Rosecrans or restore Confederate control of East Tennessee. Eicher and the McPhersons call it a "stunning tactical and strategic victory", but most historians see it as incomplete with the caveats of failed goals and in light of the steady stream of the Army of Tennessee's ensuing defeats.)

=== The Chattanooga campaign ===
After pausing on the battlefield for a day, Bragg took his larger army north, entrenching to the east, south, and west of Chattanooga, thereby commanding the river and besieging the AoC. Bragg sent Wheeler's cavalry roaming north of the Tennessee River interrupting the AoC's resupply convoys. The Rebels' positions on Lookout and Raccoon mountains west of Chattanooga, made the railroad, the river, and the wagon roads between Chattanooga and the 10th Illinois' position at the Bridgeport railhead, a distance of 26 miles (42 km) by rail, unusable. Due to this situation, all supplies for Chattanooga had to be hauled by the Anderson road, a circuitous route, north of the river, over mountainous country, increasing the distance to over 60 miles (97 km). The region along the road became so exhausted of food for the cattle that by the time they reached Chattanooga they were in as bad condition as the animals already there. Nothing could be transported but food, and the army were without sufficient shoes or clothing for the coming winter. The unpaved road was significantly worsened by heavy autumn rains that began in late September.

==== Siege ====
Due to Rosecrans' preparations and stocking of supplies in Chattanooga prior to Chickamauga, the AoC did not really feel the effect of short rations, but many of its horses and mules died due to lack of forage. On Thursday, October 1, the AoC scouts and local Unionists reported Wheeler's cavalry nearing the Anderson road in the Sequatchie Valley. The 10th, 16th, and 60th Illinois went across the river at 3:00 p.m., to head north to protect a ten-mile long wagon train with the 10th and 14th Michigan following them at 8:00 p.m. The next day, Friday, before they could arrive, Wheeler made a devastating attack on it ay Anderson's Crossroads, 25 miles (40 km) up the valley from the river just before the supply route crossed over Walden Ridge. The 10th Illinois and its brigade mates skirmished with Wheeler's troops. As dusk neared Wheeler broke contact carrying away many mules and wagons as the left the road. This loss in wagons, with the roads becoming almost impassable by reason of the heavy rains and the growing weakness of the animals, lessened daily the amount of supplies brought into the town, so that suddenly, the long term survival of the horses and mules was in serious doubt, which was what Bragg was quietly waiting for. Despite successfully recovering over 800 mules as well as wagons and stores on Sunday, Wheeler had dealt a blow to the AoC's horses, mules, and fodder situation.

To supply an army some forty thousand strong, by wagon transportation over rough mountain roads a distance of sixty miles, Bragg thought was an impossibility, and that unless other lines were opened up, the city would be his at minimum cost. The 10th Illinois spent the next seventeen days femding off Rebel cavalry in the Sequatchie, returning to Bridgeport, Saturday, October 17. After resupply, the regiment's brigade recrossed the river and returned to Anderson's Crossroads where it remained until the next Saturday, October 24.

As the siege set in, Rosecrans reorganized his army to counter the losses from Chickamauga moving the 10th Illinois and its brigade (its "twin 16th Illinois, 60th Illinois, and 10th and 14th Michigan), now under Morgan, to the 1st Brigade of Davis' 2nd Division of Thomas' XIV Corps.

==== Reinforcement and relief ====
The United States high command began immediate preparations to relieve the city. Only hours after the defeat at Chickamauga, Secretary of War Edwin M. Stanton ordered Maj. Gen. Joseph Hooker to Chattanooga. On September 24, Joseph Hooker had been detached from the Army of the Potomac (AoP) with the 2nd and 3rd divisions (Steinwehr's and Schurz's) of XI Corps and XII Corps. Hooker and his troops traveled, within twelve days, from the AoP on the Rappahannock via the U.S. railroads to the Tennessee River at Bridgeport, without an accident or detention. (Note: The efficiency of the United States' railroads over the Confederacy's effectively canceled the normal advantage of interior lines of communications that the Rebels possessed. While traveling 400 miles (640 km) further with slightly more than twice the number, the troops had taken the same time as Longstreet's troops who had arrived two weeks earlier still lacking arms and supplies. To avoid placing an even greater logistic burden on the Army of the Cumberland, Hooker's force was kept at Bridgeport where they could be easily supplied from Nashville by railroad. Grant wrote, "Hooker had brought with him from the east a full supply of land transportation. His animals had not been subjected to hard work on bad roads without forage, but were in good condition.") Upon arrival, members of Hooker's command were stunned to see how hungry these units that made it out of Chattanooga were.

Even before the Union defeat, Maj. Gen. Ulysses S. Grant had been ordered to send his available force to assist Rosecrans, and it departed under his chief subordinate, Maj. Gen. William T. Sherman, from Vicksburg, Mississippi. On September 29, Stanton ordered Grant to go to Chattanooga himself via Louisville where he met Stanton and received command of the newly created Military Division of the Mississippi, bringing territory from the Appalachian Mountains to the Mississippi River under a unified command. On October 18 en route, Grant replaced Rosecrans with Thomas to command of the AoC, arriving in Chattanooga on October 23. Rosecrans had begun planning to reopen his supply lines with his chief engineer, "Baldy" Smith and Thomas. Grant met with Rosecrans at Stevenson rail junction after dark on October 21, learning of these plans, but wondered why Rosecrans had not implemented his own suggestions. (Note: Kimmerly suggests that by this point he suffered from extreme sleep deficiency. Rosecrans's insomnia became chronic at Corinth, Stones River, Chickamauga, and during the siege.)

When Grant arrived at Bridgeport, the 10th Illinois was still at Anderson's Crossroads. After his arrival in Chattanooga, Thomas and Smith had continued the planning they started under Rosecrans, and briefed him and received his go ahead. The plan, a three pronged attack converging on Brown's Ferry from the east landing of the ferry, down the river landing on the west landing, and up the railroad in Lookout Valley from Bridgeport. As part of the movement of forces to screen the preparations, the 10th Illinois' brigade was sent 20 miles (32 km) east to Igo's Ferry, Saturday, October 24, to secure and screen the left flank.

The Brown's Ferry operation occurred over Monday night into Tuesday morning, October 27. After gaining the ferry, U.S. forces defeated the Rebels at Wauhatchie reopening supply lines to Bridgeport. News spread quickly as the AoC was now receiving reinforcements and supplies. U.S. forces now had its link to the outside and could receive supplies, weapons, ammunition, and reinforcements via the Cracker Line. Grant could now amass forces to take back the initiative from Bragg. The AoC would soon be one of three U.S. field armies in the city. Relieving troops claimed to see "half-famished" soldiers of the trapped army, but the men of the 10th Illinois and the rest of the AoC had been able to compensate for their dwindling rations by vigorous foraging. An added bonus was that in addition to opening an overland supply line of from Bridgeport to Chattanooga, the Fedralsk the siege also opened the Tennessee River to logistic support from Bridgeport to Kelly's Ferry. Federals now controlled their line of communication.

The AoC had held out and was now receiving reinforcements and supplies. Grant could now amass forces to take back the initiative from Bragg. The AoC would soon be one of three U.S. field armies in the city.

The effect of the secure, reliable logistics support were such that Grant wrote:

It is hard for any one not an eye-witness to realize the relief this brought. The men were soon reclothed and well fed; an abundance of ammunition was brought up, and a cheerfulness prevailed not before enjoyed in many weeks. Neither officers nor men looked upon themselves any longer as doomed. The weak and languid appearance of the troops, so visible before, disappeared at once. I do not know what the effect was on the other side, but assume it must have been correspondingly depressing. Mr. Davis had visited Bragg but a short time before, and must have perceived our condition to be about as Bragg described it in his subsequent report. " These dispositions," he said, " faithfully sustained, insured the enemy's speedy evacuation of Chattanooga, for want of food and forage. Possessed of the shortest route to his depot and the one by which reinforcements must reach him, we held him at our mercy, and his destruction was only a question of time." But the dispositions were not " faithfully sustained", and I doubt not that thousands of men engaged in trying to " sustain " them now rejoice that they were not.

==== Amassing troops ====
Even before he had taken command of the theater, Grant had detached Sherman's Army of the Tennessee (AoT) of four divisions to go to Chattanooga. On October 3, they had gone upriver from Vicksburg to Memphis and then moved along the Memphis & Charleston Railroad. Grant tasked him to repair the rail line as he moved eastward. Due to the amount of repairs needed, it took six weeks before they arrived at Bridgeport. (Note: Sherman's four divisions totaled 17,000. He also brought all his wagon train, horse transport, and engineers.) Grant dedicated the line from Memphis to supplying Sherman and realized that he needed more repairs done on the rail lines to Nashville to be able supply Thomas, Hooker, and even Burnside in Knoxville who had no functioning railways available. He directed Sherman to send men from Bridgeport up the line to Nashville to make these repairs. (Note: This also included efforts to repair East Tennessee, Virginia and Georgia Railway connection to Knoxville.)

The defeat at Wauhatchie angered Bragg who blamed Longstreet. When he asked permission from Davis to relieve him, Bragg suggested sending Longstreet and his corps of 15,000 troops and Wheeler's 5,000 cavalry to Knoxville to attack Burnside there and threaten Grant's left flank. Longstreet objected because his force was not sufficiently larger than Burnside's and because his departure would weaken the Rebels besieging the city just as the U.S. forces were increasing. On Wednesday, November 4, Longstreet left Chattanooga passing on the opposite bank from the 10h Illinois' positions. (Note: Historians have called Bragg's detachment of Longstreet "..a substantial mistake" (Catton) and that after this "all the good opportunities were gone forever."(Catton) Grant knew immediately when Longstreet's troops were pulled from the Confederate lines and was able to plan accordingly.)

By the second week of November, the U.S. had brought in twice the logistics needed to sustain the U.S. troops. The AoC had reinforced but still noy ready for offensive operations. Grant planned on Thomas making a demonstration against Bragg's right flank the first week of November but Thomas balked, suggesting instead,attacking Bragg's left . Thomas, Baldy Smith, and Brannan, now commanding the Army of the Cumberland's artillery, scouted Rebel positions on Saturday, November 7, from heights on the northern side of the Tennessee. Surprisingly, they that the planning maps were incorrect and Thomas would need to move his artillery to support the attack. The party reported back to Grant that they would not be able to make the attack. Grant was surprised by the intelligence, but Thomas suggested using Hooker's troops to clear Lookout Mountain to remove any threat to their supply lines. Grant accepted this and reassessed the situation, letting the War Department know that nothing could be done to help Burnside until Sherman arrived.

Burnside, confident in his ability to defend himself, suggested that he pull all his forces between Chattanooga and Knoxville back to his fortifications in the city to draw Longstreet further away from his railhead at Loudon (Note: As East Tennessee was strongly loyal, local Unionist partisans had burned bridges between Loudon and Knoxville in 1861 and early 1862. The Confederacy hanged any local partisans that they captured. These actions severed the continuous rail link to Virginia which in turn, more than a year later, forced Longstreet and his force to take as long as Hooker's rail journey to go half as far.) to prevent Longstreet, as he had feared, from returning to Bragg when Grant inevitably attacked. Grant thought it a wise move, okayed the plan, and then made plans to attack once Sherman and his force were in town and rested. On Saturday, November 14, Sherman reached Bridgeport in person checking in with Grant that evening. On Sunday, Sherman and his lead troops reached Chattanooga.

Grant's operational plan was already prepared, save the dates, before Sherman's arrival. With Sherman's arrival, Grant would have forces twice as large as Bragg's army trying to besiege them, and he could put together a timetable for the operation. The 10th Illinois and the rest of the AoC would play a supporting role with Sherman's Vicksburg veteran AoT delivering a hammer blow on Patrick Cleburne's division on Bragg's right at the northern end of Missionary Ridge, across the river from the 10th Illinois' station. This was planned for Saturday, November 21, as the last of Sherman's troops would arrive that Friday, but heavy rain upset the timetable. While the 10th Illinois was preparing to return to its army in the city, Sherman's troops were being delayed by muddy roads and the fragility of the pontoon bridge at Brown's Ferry. Grant was forced to slide the schedule again to Monday, November 23. By Friday night, only one of Sherman's brigades had crossed over Brown's Ferry and the attack had to be postponed thereby increasing pressure from Washington to aid Burnside at Knoxville.

Bragg had sent his cavalry to attack U.S. supply lines and ergo, lacked intelligence on Grant's movements, assuming Sherman would head toward Knoxville, not Chattanooga. With Forrest and Wheeler failing in the cavalry's scouting role, Bragg expected an attack on his left flank, Lookout Mountain. On November 12, Bragg placed Carter Stevenson in overall command for the defense of the mountain, with a division on the summit and three brigades on the narrow and relatively flat shelf that wrapped around the northern end of the mountain approximately halfway to the summit. Thomas L. Connelly, historian of the Army of Tennessee, wrote that despite the imposing appearance of Lookout Mountain, "the mountain's strength was a myth. ... It was impossible to hold [the bench, which] was commanded by Federal artillery at Moccasin Bend." Although Stevenson placed an artillery battery on the crest of the mountain, the guns could not be depressed enough to reach the bench, which was accessible from numerous trails on the west side of the mountain.

Bragg made his troop disposition worse on November 22, ordering Cleburne to withdraw his and Buckner's divisions from the line and march to Chickamauga Station, for railroad transport to Knoxville, removing 11,000 more men from the defense of Chattanooga. Bragg apparently believed, as Grant had hoped, Sherman was moving on Knoxville, which meant Longstreet would needed the reinforcements.

=== 1864 ===
In this capacity the Army fought at the Battle of Island Number Ten. The regiment saw service at the Battle of Island Number Ten, the Battle of Resaca, the Battle of Kennesaw Mountain, the March to the Sea and the Carolinas campaign. The regiment was mustered out on July 4, 1865, and discharged at Chicago, Illinois, on July 11, 1865.

== Affiliations, battle honors, detailed service, and casualties ==
=== Organizational affiliation ===
The 10th Illinois Volunteer Infantry Regiment formed at Springfield, Ill., April 20, 1861, and served with the following organizations:

- Prentiss' Brigade, April until mustered out on July 29, 1861.
- Re-organized as three year at Cairo July 29, 1861, attached to District of Cairo, Ill., to October, 1861.
- 1st Brigade, District of Cairo, to February, 1862.
- 4th Brigade, 1st Division, District of Cairo, February, 1862.
- 1st Brigade, 4th Division, AoM, to April, 1862.
- 2nd Brigade, 1st Division, AoM, to September, 1862.
- 2nd Brigade, 13th Division, AoO, to November, 1862.
- 1st Brigade, 4th Division, Centre XIV Corps, Army of the Cumberland (AoC), to January, 1863.
- 1st Brigade, 4th Division, XIV Corps, AoC, to June, 1863.
- 1st Brigade, 2nd Division, Reserve Corps, AoC, to October, 1863.
- 1st Brigade, 2nd Division, XIV Corps, AoC, to August, 1864.
- 3rd Brigade, 4th Division, XVI Corps, AoT, to September, 1864.
- 3rd Brigade, 1st Division, XVII Corps, AoT, to July, 1865.

=== List of battles ===
The official list of battles in which the regiment bore a part:

- Battle of Island Number Ten
- Siege of Corinth
- Battle of Missionary Ridge
- Battle of Kennesaw Mountain
- Siege of Atlanta
- Battle of Jonesborough
- March to the Sea
- Battle of Bentonville

=== Detailed service ===
==== 1861 ====
- Regiment formed from first four Companies reporting at Springfield, IL, April 20.
- Ordered to Cairo, IL., April 22.
- Regiment fully organized and mustered in for three months' service, April 29.
- Re-organized as three-year regiment, at Cairo, July 29.
- Moved to Mound City, IL, and duty there until January, 1862.

==== 1862 ====
- Mound City, until January 16.
- Expedition into Kentucky January 16–21.
- At Bird's Point, Mo., until March.
- Skirmish at Sykestown, Mo., March 1 (Detachment).
- Operations against New Madrid and Island No. 10 March 3-April 8.
- Actions at New Madrid March 12–14.
- Capture of New Madrid March 14.
- Island No. 10 April 6.
- Action and capture at Tiptonville April 8.
- Expedition to Fort Pillow, Tenn., April 13–17.
- Moved to Hamburg Landing, Tenn., April 17–24.
- Advance on and siege of Corinth, MS
- April 29-May 30.
- Engagement at Farmington May 3.
- Pursuit to Booneville May 30-June 12.
- Tuscumbia Creek May 31-June 1.
- Reconnaissance toward Baldwyn June 3.
- At Clear Creek until July 21.
- Ordered to Tuscumbia, Ala., July 21, thence march to Nashville, Tenn., via Florence, Athens and Columbia August 28-September 15.
- Siege of Nashville September 15-November 6.
- Repulse of Morgan's attack on Edgefield November 5.
- Duty at Nashville and Edgefield until July, 1863.

==== 1863 ====
- Moved to Murfreesboro July 20, thence to Bridgeport, AL, August 24-September 12, and duty there until October.
- Pursuit of Wheeler up the Sequatchie Valley October 1–17.
- Action at Anderson's Cross Roads October 2.
- At Anderson's Cross Roads until October 24.
- Moved to Igo's Ferry October 24.
- Chattanooga-Ringgold Campaign November 23–27.
- Tunnel Hill November 24–25.
- Missionary Ridge November 25.
- Chickamauga Station November 26.
- March to relief of Knoxville November 28-December 8.
- March to Columbus, thence to Chattanooga and to Rossville, GA.
- Regiment Veteranize December 27.
- Veterans on furlough January 11 to February 22, 1864

==== 1864 ====
- At Rossville until May 2.
- Atlanta Campaign May 2-September 8.
- Demonstrations on Dalton May 5–13.
- Tunnel Hill May 6–7.
- Rocky Faced Ridge May 8–11.
- Buzzard's Roost Gap May 8–9.
- Battle of Resaca May 14–15.
- Rome, Ga., May 17–18.
- Operations on line of Pumpkin Vine Creek and battles about Dallas, New Hope Church and Allatoona Hills May 25-June 5.
- Operations about Marietta and against Kenesaw Mountain June 10-July 2.
- Pine Hill June 11–14.
- Lost Mountain June 15–17.
- Assault on Kenesaw June 27.
- Ruff's Station, Smyrna Camp Ground, July 4.
- Chattahoochie River July 5–17.
- Peach Tree Creek July 19–20.
- Siege of Atlanta July 22-August 25.
- Utoy Creek August 5–7.
- Flank movement on Jonesboro August 25–30.
- Battle of Jonesboro August 31-September 1.
- Lovejoy Station September 2–6.
- Pursuit of Hood into Alabama October 1–26.
- Action at Resaca, GA, October 12–13.
- March to the sea November 15-December 10.
- Monteith Swamp December 9.
- Siege of Savannah December 10–21.

==== 1865 ====
- Campaign of the Carolinas January to April.
- Moved to Beaufort, S.C., January 3, thence to Pocotaligo.
- Reconnaissance to Salkehatchie River January 20.
- Salkehatchie Swamp February 2–5.
- Rivers' and Broxton's Bridges February 2.
- Rivers' Bridge February 3.
- Binnaker's Bridge, South Edisto River, February 9.
- Orangeburg, North Edisto River, February 11–12.
- Columbia February 15–17.
- Fayetteville, N. C., March 11.
- Cape Fear March 18.
- Cox's Bridge, Neuse River, March 19–20.
- Battle of Bentonville March 20–21.
- Occupation of Goldsboro March 24.
- Advance on Raleigh April 10–14.
- Occupation of Raleigh April 14.
- Bennett's House April 26.
- Surrender of Johnston and his army.
- March to Washington, DC, via Richmond, April 29-May 19.
- Grand Review May 24.
- Moved to Louisville, KY, June 4.
- Mustered out July 4, 1865, and discharged at Chicago, IL, July 11, 1865.

=== Total strength and casualties ===
The regiment suffered 2 officers and 48 enlisted men killed in action or mortally wounded and 136 enlisted men who died of disease, for a total of 186 fatalities.

== Armament ==
The 10th Illinois was initially issued a mix of imported British Pattern 1853 rifles ("3-band") (Note: hese were the standard rifle for the British army having performed well in the Crimean War. The Enfield was a .577 calibre Minié-type muzzle-loading rifled musket. It was used by both armies and was the second most widely used infantry weapon in the Union forces.) and state stocks of Model 1855 and 1861 Springfield Rifles. Through its service more imported Enfields and refurbished Springfields were issued. Up to its mustering out the Enfield remained its standard long arm.

=== Regimental ordance surveys ===
Survey for Fourth Quarter, 31 December 1862

- A — 62 British Pattern 1853 rifles, (.58 and .577 Cal)
- B — 54 Springfield Rifled Muskets, model 1855, 1861, NA and contract, (.58 Cal.)
- C — 114 British Pattern 1853 rifles, (.58 and .577 Cal)
- D — 116 British Pattern 1853 rifles, (.58 and .577 Cal)
- E — 60 British Pattern 1853 rifles, (.58 and .577 Cal)
- F — 58 British Pattern 1853 rifles, (.58 and .577 Cal)
- G — 42 British Pattern 1853 rifles, (.58 and .577 Cal)
- H — 52 British Pattern 1853 rifles, (.58 and .577 Cal)
- I — 51 British Pattern 1853 rifles, (.58 and .577 Cal)
- K — 45 British Pattern 1853 rifles, (.58 and .577 Cal)

Survey for Second Quarter, 30 June 1863

- A — 60 British Pattern 1853 rifles, (.58 and .577 Cal)
- B — 47 Springfield Rifled Muskets, model 1855, 1861, NA and contract, (.58 Cal.)
- C — 44 British Pattern 1853 rifles, (.58 and .577 Cal)
- D — 40 British Pattern 1853 rifles, (.58 and .577 Cal)
- E — 62 British Pattern 1853 rifles, (.58 and .577 Cal)
- F — 55 British Pattern 1853 rifles, (.58 and .577 Cal)
- G — 44 British Pattern 1853 rifles, (.58 and .577 Cal)
- H — 48 British Pattern 1853 rifles, (.58 and .577 Cal)
- I — 47 British Pattern 1853 rifles, (.58 and .577 Cal)
- K — 50 British Pattern 1853 rifles, (.58 and .577 Cal)

Survey for First Quarter, 31 March 1864

- A — 59 British Pattern 1853 rifles, (.58 and .577 Cal)
- B — 47 Springfield Rifled Muskets, model 1855, 1861, NA and contract, (.58 Cal.)
- C — 38 British Pattern 1853 rifles, (.58 and .577 Cal)
- D — 34 British Pattern 1853 rifles, (.58 and .577 Cal)
- E — 55 British Pattern 1853 rifles, (.58 and .577 Cal)
- F — 36 British Pattern 1853 rifles, (.58 and .577 Cal)
- G — 39 British Pattern 1853 rifles, (.58 and .577 Cal)
- H — 41 British Pattern 1853 rifles, (.58 and .577 Cal)
- I — 43 British Pattern 1853 rifles, (.58 and .577 Cal)
- K — 50 British Pattern 1853 rifles, (.58 and .577 Cal)

Survey for First Quarter, 31 March 1865

- A — 40 British Pattern 1853 rifles, (.58 and .577 Cal)
- B — 1 Springfield Rifled Muskets, model 1855, 1861, NA and contract, (.58 Cal.); 45 British Pattern 1853 rifles, (.58 and .577 Cal)
- C — 32 British Pattern 1853 rifles, (.58 and .577 Cal)
- D — 30 British Pattern 1853 rifles, (.58 and .577 Cal)
- E — 44 British Pattern 1853 rifles, (.58 and .577 Cal)
- F — 22 British Pattern 1853 rifles, (.58 and .577 Cal)
- G — 39 British Pattern 1853 rifles, (.58 and .577 Cal)
- H — 32 British Pattern 1853 rifles, (.58 and .577 Cal)
- I — 25 British Pattern 1853 rifles, (.58 and .577 Cal)
- K — 40 British Pattern 1853 rifles, (.58 and .577 Cal

=== Shoulder Arms Gallery ===
Issued weapons

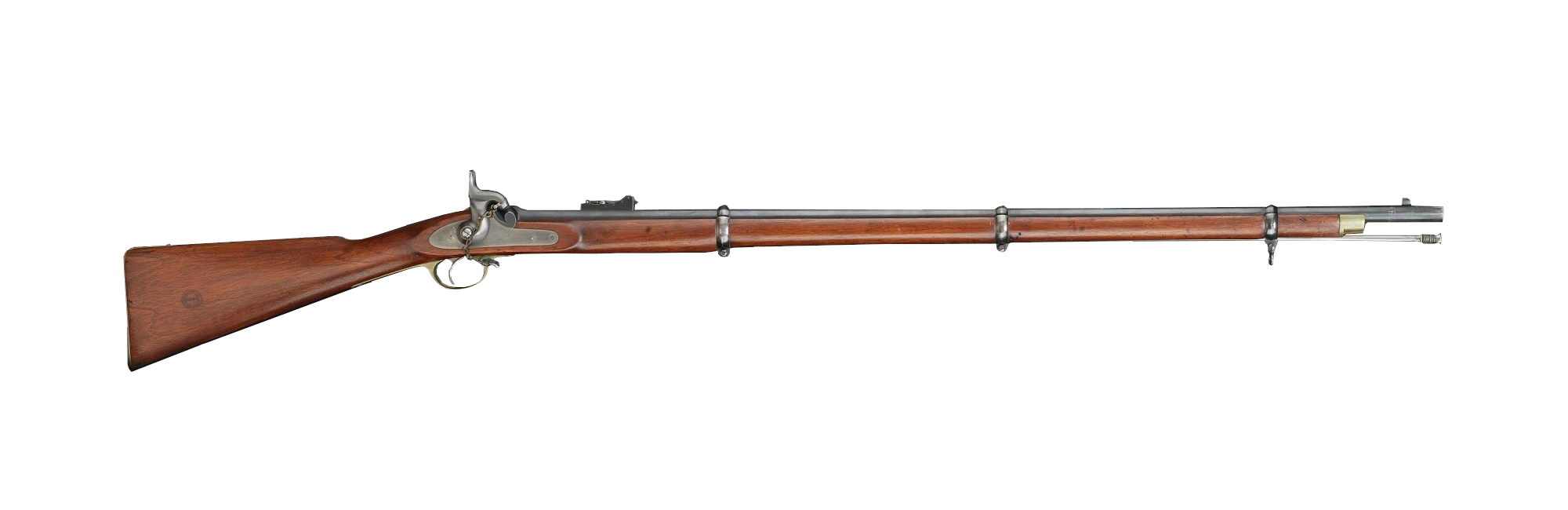
1853 Enfield rifle-musket

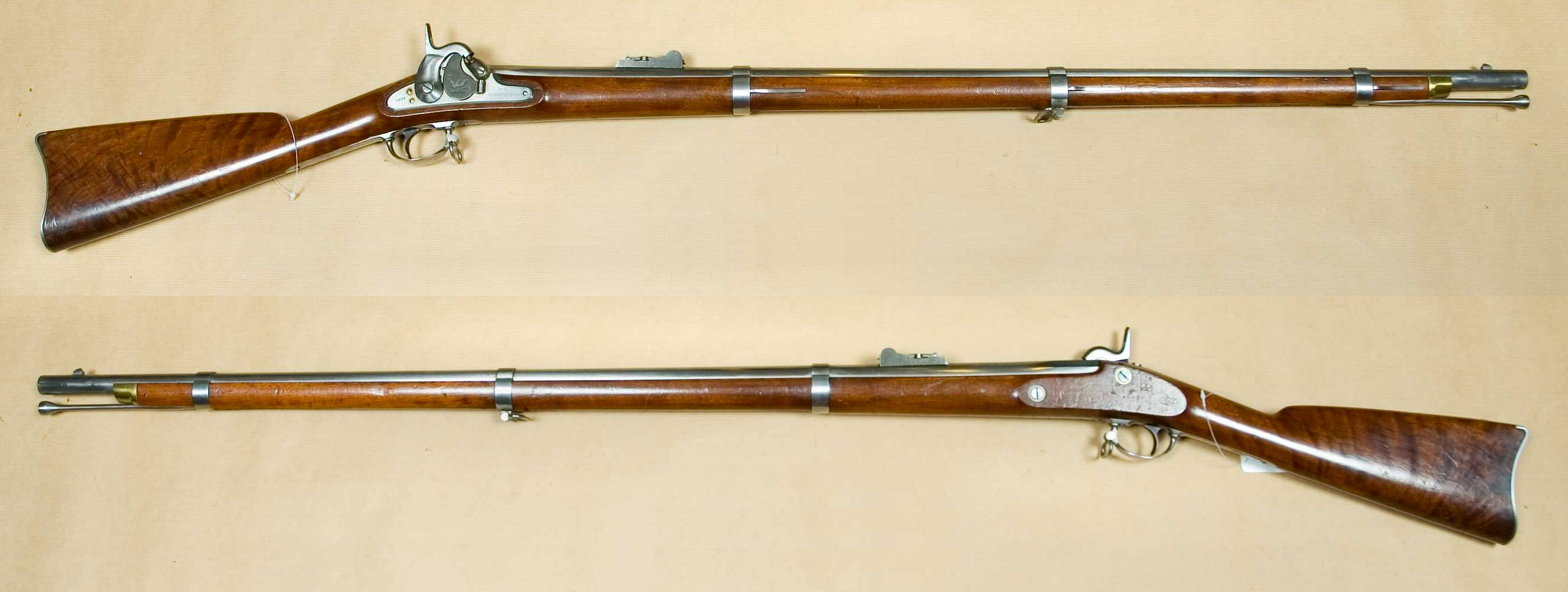
Springfield Model 1855

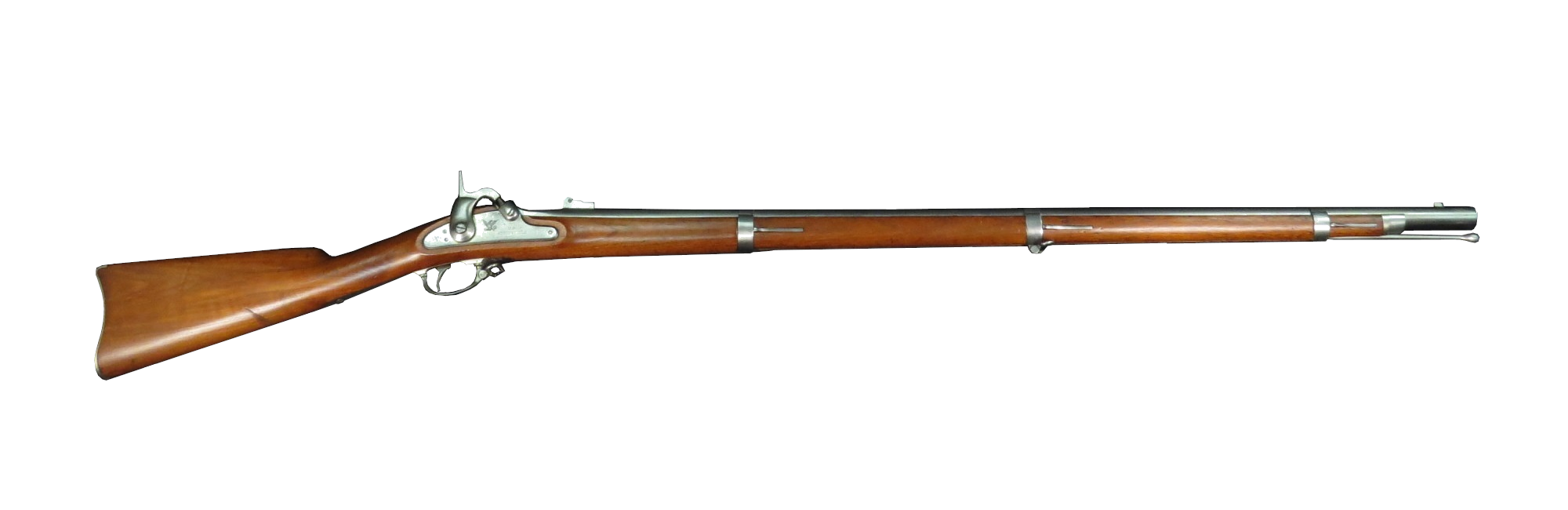
Springfield Model 1861

== Uniform ==
The men of the regiment were issued their initial uniforms as they became available during training in Springfield. The members wore militia gray jackets and trousers from state stocks and were issued gray broad-rimmed hats with one side fo;ded up similar to the Hardee hat. At some time between the new year and jopining Pope's AoM, they were issued the standard federal uniform of dark blue sack coats, sky blue trousers, blue forage caps, and the sky blue winter overcoat.

== Commanders ==
- Colonel James D. Morgan - promoted to brigadier general on July 17, 1862
- Colonel John Tillson - discharged with the regiment

== See also ==
- List of Illinois Civil War units
- Illinois in the Civil War
