= Savannah campaign order of battle =

The order of battle for the Savannah campaign (Sherman's March to the Sea) includes:

- Savannah campaign order of battle: Confederate
- Savannah campaign order of battle: Union

== See also ==
- Battle of Savannah (disambiguation)
