= Battle of Island Number Ten order of battle =

The order of battle for the Battle of Island Number Ten includes:

- Battle of Island Number Ten order of battle: Confederate
- Battle of Island Number Ten order of battle: Union
