= 16th Illinois Infantry Regiment =

16th Regiment Illinois Volunteer Infantry
- Illinois state flag
- Active: May 24, 1861, to July 8, 1865
- Country: United States
- Allegiance: Union
- Branch: United States Army; Union Army
- Type: Infantry
- Engagements: Battle of Island No. 10; Siege of Corinth; Battle of Resaca; Battle of Atlanta; Battle of Kennesaw Mountain; Battle of Atlanta; Battle of Jonesboro; March to the Sea; Battle of Bentonville

The 16th Regiment Illinois Volunteer Infantry, nicknamed "The Twins" for its long association with the 10th Illinois, was an infantry regiment that served in the Union Army during the American Civil War.

== Service ==
The 16th Illinois Infantry was organized at Quincy, Illinois, and mustered into Federal service on May 24, 1861, for three years' service.

Its Early Service was spent in Missouri, guarding railroads. In July 1861, a Detachment under Colonel Robert Smith successfully held Monroe Station against 1,600 mounted Confederates. The Regiment spent the remainder of 1861 in skirmishes at Platte City and Pursuing Rebel forces under General Green.

=== New Madrid and the Mississippi River Campaign ===
In early 1862, it joined the Army of the Mississippi. During the Battle of New Madrid, the 16th moved under the cover of night to erect earthworks within half a mile of the enemy lines. Following the Union victory, they assisted in the capture of 5,000 prisoners at Tiptonville, Tennessee.

The regiment later took part in the Siege of Corinth, and spent the summer of 1862 marching through Alabama and Tennessee. Eventually, Garrisoning Nashville. In November 1862, they successfully repulsed an attack on the Edgefield Railroad Bridge by Confederate General John Hunt Morgan.

The Regiment spent much of 1863 guarding supply lines and ordnance stores in Alabama and Tennessee. During this period, the regiment was transferred to the XIV Corps. Between December 20th and 31st, 1863, the regiment re-enlisted as a Veteran Regiment. Returning to Illinois for a 30-day Furlough before resuming their service in February 1864.

=== Atlanta Campaign ===
The regiment took part in the Atlanta Campaign, where it saw heavy fighting at Resaca, Kenesaw Mountain, Atlanta , and Jonesboro

It later took part in Sherman's March to the Sea, and had the distinction of being the representative regiment to take possession of Savannah upon its evacuation.

=== Battle of Bentonville ===
The regiment took part in the Battle of Bentonville, where on the first day, it held its position against six Confederate Attacks; at one point, it had to climb over their own breastworks to open fire at the confederates who had swung into their rear. On the second day, a mistaken order led the regiment into heavy fire; within 15 minutes, it took heavy casualties.

Following the Surrender of Joseph E. Johnston's Army, the 16th Illinois Marched to Washington, D.C, where it participated in the Grand Review of the Armies on May 24th, 1865.

The regiment was mustered out of service on July 8, 1865, in Louisville, Kentucky.

== Total strength and casualties ==
The regiment suffered 3 officers and 54 enlisted men who were killed in action or who died of their wounds, and 3 officers and 110 enlisted men who died of disease, for a total of 170 fatalities.

== Commanders ==
- Colonel Robert Frederick Smith - Mustered out with the regiment.

== See also ==
- List of Illinois Civil War Units
- Illinois in the American Civil War

== Notes ==
The link " http://www.rootsweb.com/~ilcivilw/f&s/016-fs.htm" is no longer valid.
