= Battery C, 1st Illinois Light Artillery Regiment =

- Active: October 31, 1861 - June 14, 1865
- Country: United States
- Allegiance: Union
- Branch: Artillery
- Engagements: Battle of Island No. 10; Siege of Corinth; Battle of Stones River; Tullahoma Campaign; Battle of Chickamauga; Battle of Missionary Ridge; Atlanta campaign Battle of Kennesaw Mountain; Siege of Atlanta; Battle of Jonesboro; Sherman's March to the Sea; Carolinas campaign Battle of Bentonville

Battery C, 1st Illinois Light Artillery Regiment, was an artillery battery that served in the Union Army during the American Civil War. The battery was also referred to as Channel's Battery, Ottawa Light Artillery, Prescott's Battery, and Houghtaling's Battery.

== Service ==
The battery was organized Ottawa, Illinois on October 31, 1861, and mustered in for a three-year enlistment.

The battery was attached to Military District of Cairo to October 1861. 3rd Brigade, District of Cairo, to February 1862. 4th Brigade, 1st Division, District of Cairo, February 1862. Artillery Division, Army of the Mississippi, to April 1862. Artillery 1st Division, Army of the Mississippi, to September 1862. Artillery, 13th Division, Army of the Ohio, to November 1862. 3rd Brigade, 3rd Division, Right Wing, XIV Corps, Army of the Cumberland, to January 1863. Artillery, 3rd Division, XX Corps, Army of the Cumberland, to October 1863. Artillery, 1st Division, XIV Corps, to July 1864. Artillery Brigade, XIV Corps, to June 1865.

Battery C mustered out of service in Louisville, Kentucky on June 14, 1865.

== Detailed service ==
Ordered to Cairo, Illinois. Duty in the Military District of Cairo, until February 1862. Operations against New Madrid, Missouri, and Island No. 10, Mississippi River, February 28-April 8. Action and capture at Tiptonville April 8. Expedition to Fort Pillow, Tennessee, April 13–17. Moved to Pittsburg Landing, Tennessee, April 17–23. Advance on and siege of Corinth, Mississippi, April 29-May 30. Action at Farmington May 3. Reconnaissance toward Corinth May 8. Engagement at Farmington May 9. Occupation of Corinth May 30, and pursuit to Booneville May 31-June 12. Reconnaissance toward Baldwyn June 3. At Corinth until July 21. Moved to Iuka, Mississippi, July 21, thence to Courtland, Alabama, and duty along Memphis and Charleston Railroad until September 3. March to Nashville, Tennessee, September 3–12. Action at Columbia September 9. Siege of Nashville September 12-November 7. Repulse of Forrest's attack on Edgefield November 5. Lavergne November 7. Advance on Murfreesboro December 26–30. Battle of Stones River December 30–31, 1862 and January 1–3, 1863. Duty at Murfreesboro until June. Tullahoma Campaign, June 23-July 7. Occupation of middle Tennessee until August 16. Passage of Cumberland Mountains and Tennessee River and Chickamauga Campaign August 16-September 22. Battle of Chickamauga, September 19–20. Siege of Chattanooga, Tennessee, September 24-November 23. Chattanooga-Ringgold Campaign November 23–27. Missionary Ridge November 24–25. At Rossville, Georgia, until May 1864. Atlanta Campaign May 1 to September 8. Rocky Faced Ridge May 8–11. Buzzard's Roost Gap May 8–9. Advance on Dallas May 18–25. Operations on line of Pumpkin Vine Creek and battles about Dallas, New Hope Church, and Allatoona Hills May 25-June 5. Operations about Marietta and against Kennesaw Mountain June 10-July 2. Pine Hill June 11–14. Lost Mountain June 15–17. Assault on Kennesaw June 27. Ruff's Station and Vining Station July 4. Chattahoochie River July 6–17. Peachtree Creek July 19–20. Siege of Atlanta July 22-August 25. Utoy Creek August 5–7. Flank movement on Jonesboro August 25–30. Battle of Jonesboro August 31-September 1. Lovejoy's Station September 2–6. Pursuit of Hood into Alabama October 1–26. March to the Sea November 15-December 10. Siege of Savannah December 10–21. Campaign of the Carolinas January to April 1865. Battle of Bentonville, North Carolina, March 19–21. Occupation of Goldsboro March 24. Advance on Raleigh April 10–14. Occupation of Raleigh April 14. Bennett's House April 26. Surrender of Johnston and his army. March to Washington, D.C., via Richmond, Virginia, April 29-May 20. Grand Review of the Armies May 24. Moved to Louisville, Kentucky, June.

== Casualties ==
The battery lost a total of 34 men during service; 15 enlisted men killed or mortally wounded, 19 enlisted men died of disease.

== Commanders ==
- Captain Charles Houghtaling - promoted to major
- Captain Mark H. Prescott

== See also ==
- List of Illinois Civil War units
- Illinois in the Civil War
