= Battle of Savannah =

Battle of Savannah may refer to:

- The 1778 British capture of Savannah during the American Revolutionary War
- The 1779 American siege of Savannah during the American Revolutionary War
- Closing Savannah as a port following the siege of Fort Pulaski in 1862
- The siege of Savannah following Sherman's March to the Sea in 1864
