= John Tillson =

American politician

Member of the Illinois House of Representatives from the 37th district
- In office 1873–1873

Personal details
- Born: October 12, 1825 Hillsboro, Illinois, US
- Died: August 6, 1892 (aged 66) Quincy, Illinois, US
- Party: Republican
- Education: Illinois College; Transylvania Law School

John Tillson (October 25, 1825 – August 6, 1892) was an American lawyer, newspaper editor, and politician. He served in the Illinois House of Representatives.

== Early life ==
John Tillson was born on October 25, 1825, in Hillsboro, Illinois. Tillson went to Hillsboro Academy and Illinois College. While at Illinois College, he was a founder of Sigma Pi Literary Society.

In 1847, Tillson received his law degree from the Transylvania Law School and was admitted to the Illinois bar in Quincy, Illinois.

== Career ==
Tillison practiced law in Quincy, Illinois. During the Civil War, he served in the 10th Illinois Volunteer Infantry Regiment and was commissioned colonel. In 1869 and 1870, Tillson was the editor of the Quincy Whig newspaper. Tillson served on the Quincy City Council from 1867 to 1871.

In 1873, Tillson was elected to the Illinois House of Representatives, as a Republican, succeeding Nehemiah Bushnell who died in office. In June 1873, Tillson resigned from the Illinois General Assembly when he was appointed Internal Revenue Collector serving until 1881.

== Personal life ==
Tillson died on August 6, 1892, at his home in Quincy, Illinois.
