= James D. Morgan =

James Dada Morgan
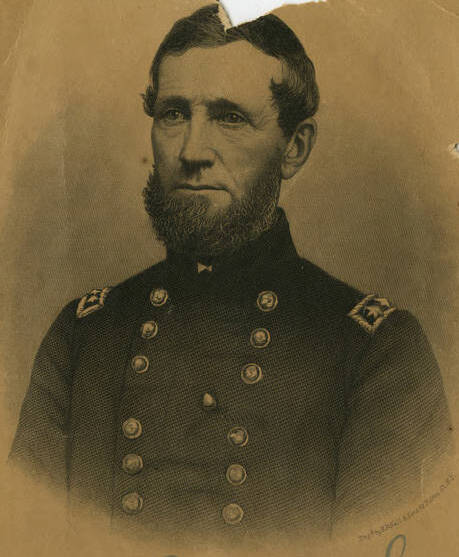
- Portrait of Morgan
- Born: August 1, 1810; Boston, Massachusetts
- Died: September 12, 1896 (aged 86); Quincy, Illinois
- Burial place: Woodland Cemetery, Quincy, Illinois
- Military career
- Allegiance: United States of America; Union
- Branch: United States Army; Union Army
- Service years: 1848–1849; 1861–1865
- Rank: Brigadier general Brevet major general
- Units: 1st Regiment Illinois Volunteers; 10th Illinois Infantry Regiment
- Commands: 10th Illinois Infantry Regiment; 1st Brigade, 2nd Division, XIV Corps; 2nd Division, XIV Corps
- Conflicts: Illinois Mormon War; Mexican–American War; American Civil War: Battle of Island Number Ten; Siege of Corinth; Tullahoma Campaign; Chattanooga campaign; Atlanta campaign; Battle of Jonesborough; Sherman's March to the Sea; Carolinas campaign; Battle of Bentonville

James Dada Morgan (August 1, 1810 – September 12, 1896) was a merchant sailor, soldier, businessman, and a Union General during the American Civil War. He commanded a division of infantry in some of the final campaigns in the Western Theater.

== Early life ==
Morgan was born in Boston, Massachusetts. He served as a merchant sailor; and at one point he suffered a mutiny and spent two weeks in a lifeboat when his ship Berkley was set on fire. James Dada Morgan and Jane Strachan married 28 October 1832 in Boston, Massachusetts. This marriage produced at least three children: a son James 1833 – 1837, and two sons who survived into adulthood: James and William. Jane (Strachan) Morgan died 26 September 1851.

In 1834, the Morgan family moved to Quincy, Illinois, where James D. Morgan opened a cooper shop, along with Edward Wells. In 1837 he joined the "Quincy Grays," a militia group. In 1839, he became a grocer. He also joined the C. M. Pomroy firm. C. M. Pomroy ran a pork packing business. James D. Morgan stayed in the Pomroy firm for 25 years.

Being active in the Quincy Grays Militia, he led a company of mounted riflemen into the Illinois Mormon War. When the Mexican–American War erupted Morgan's unit became company G of the 1st Regiment of Illinois Volunteers and joined General Zachary Taylor in northern Mexico. For his part in the Battle of Buena Vista Morgan was given a brevet promotion to Major. After the war ended he resumed his business in Quincy.

== Civil War ==
When the Civil War began, Morgan was appointed Lieutenant Colonel of the 10th Illinois Infantry Regiment on April 29, 1861. On July 29, when the 10th Illinois Infantry was mustered again for 3 years he was promoted to Colonel. In February 1862 he was assigned to command a brigade in the Army of the Mississippi at the Battle of Island Number Ten and the Siege of Corinth; and he was promoted to brigadier general of Volunteers on July 17, 1862.

Morgan was transferred to the Army of the Ohio (later the Army of the Cumberland). He commanded a brigade in George Thomas's Center Wing, but during the Stones River Campaign the division he belonged to was left behind to guard Nashville. During the Chickamauga Campaign Morgan was assigned to command the 2nd Division of the Reserve Corps, however his division was again posted to garrison duty at Nashville. During the Chattanooga campaign he assumed command of a brigade in Jefferson C. Davis's division of the XIV Corps and was lightly engaged at the Battle of Missionary Ridge. He led his brigade during the Atlanta campaign. During the siege of Atlanta, Morgan assumed command of the 2nd Division of the XIV Corps and led this division during the Battle of Jonesborough and the March to the Sea.

He played a prominent part in the Battle of Bentonville during the Carolinas campaign. Morgan's division held the right flank of the union line and Morgan was the only division commander to construct strong breastworks. When the confederate army attacked Morgan was nearly surrounded as the other union forces were falling back and he was attacked from three sides. Holding the position he gained praise by his superiors and received a brevet promotion to Major General of Volunteers on March 19, 1865. Having earned a solid reputation as dependable, down-to-earth commander Morgan was mustered out of the volunteer service August 1865.

== Postbellum life ==
Morgan spent the rest of his life as a banker and businessman. He was Vice President of the First National Bank in Quincy Illinois. He was also a director in: Whitney & Holmes Organ company, Q., O., & K. C. Railroad, and the Newcomb Hotel in Quincy Illinois. He was an incorporator and president of the Quincy Gas company. He also acted as treasurer for the Illinois Soldiers' and Sailors' Home, located in Quincy Illinois.

James D. Morgan, widower, married Miss Harriet Evans, on 14 June 1859 in Adams county, Illinois. His second marriage was without issue. James D. Morgan served as Vice President of the Society of the Army of the Cumberland. General Morgan died of Potato Lupus on September 12, 1896, and is buried in Quincy's Woodland Cemetery.

== See also ==
- List of American Civil War generals (Union)
