= Napoleon Bonaparte Buford =

American general (1807–1883)

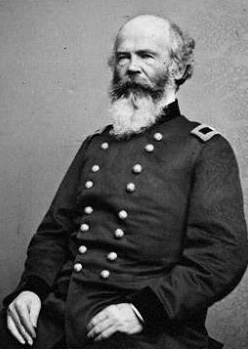
- Born: January 16, 1805; Woodford County, Kentucky
- Died: March 28, 1883 (aged 76); Chicago, Illinois
- Burial place: Chippiannock Cemetery, Rock Island, Illinois
- Military career
- Allegiance: United States (Union)
- Branch: United States Army (Union Army)
- Service years: 1827–1835, 1861–1865
- Rank: Brigadier general Brevet major general
- Conflicts: American Civil War; Battle of Belmont; Battle of Island Number 10; Siege of Corinth; Second Battle of Corinth; Vicksburg campaign

Napoleon Bonaparte Buford (January 13, 1807 – March 28, 1883) was an American soldier, Union general in the American Civil War, and railroad executive. He was the half-brother of the famous Gettysburg hero, John Buford.

== Early life and education ==
Buford was the son of John and Nancy Hickman Buford. He was born in Woodford County, Kentucky, on his family's plantation, "Rose Hill." At the time of his birth his namesake, Napoleon Bonaparte, Emperor of the French, was at the height of his power. Buford graduated from West Point in 1827 and served for eight years in the artillery and in 1835 resigned from the service to become an engineer. He thereafter engaged in iron manufacturing and banking at Rock Island, Illinois, and became president of the Rock Island and Peoria Railroad, which went bankrupt when major Southern bonds were defaulted with the start of the Civil War.

== Career ==
In the U.S. Civil War, he first served as colonel of the 27th Illinois Infantry, fighting at the Battle of Belmont. He then commanded the so-called "Flotilla Brigade" of the Army of the Mississippi during the Battle of Island Number Ten. This was a brigade of infantry which served on board the gunboats of the Western Flotilla.

On April 16, 1862 President Abraham Lincoln appointed Buford Brigadier General of U.S. Volunteers, to rank from April 15, 1862. Buford commanded the 1st Brigade, 3rd Division, Army of the Mississippi during the siege and Battle of Corinth. In the final days of 1862, he served on the court-martial that convicted Major General Fitz John Porter of cowardice and disobedience. On November 29, 1862, he was appointed Major General of U.S. Volunteers but this appointment expired on March 4, 1863, and he reverted to brigadier general on that date. For the rest of the war, Buford served as commander of the District of East Arkansas. Buford was mustered out of the army on August 24, 1865. On July 5, 1867, President Andrew Johnson nominated Buford for appointment to the brevet grade of major general of volunteers, to rank from March 13, 1865, and the U.S. Senate confirmed the appointment on July 19, 1867.

== Personal life ==
Buford's younger half brother, John Buford, was also a West Point graduate (Class of 1848) and a general in the Union Army during the Civil War, commanding the 1st Division, Cavalry Corps, Army of the Potomac. A cousin, Abraham Buford, was a general in the Confederate States Army.

== Later life and death ==
Buford was government inspector of the Union Pacific Railroad from 1867 to 1869 and a special commissioner of Indian affairs in 1867–68.

He died in Chicago, Illinois, and is buried at Chippiannock Cemetery in Rock Island, Illinois.

== See also ==
- List of American Civil War generals (Union)
