= 10th Michigan Infantry Regiment =

- Michigan state flag
- Active: February 10, 1862 – August 1, 1865
- Disbanded: August 1, 1865
- Country: United States
- Allegiance: Union
- Branch: Army
- Type: Infantry
- Size: Regiment
- Engagements: The Siege of Corinth; Battle of Booneville; Battle of Nashville; Battle of Stones River; Battle of Missionary Ridge; Battle of Athens; Battle of Buzzard's Roost; Battle of Resaca; Battle of Rome; Battle of Dallas; Battle of Kennesaw Mountain; Battle of Peachtree Creek; Battle of Red Oak; Battle of Jonesboro; Siege of Atlanta; The Battle of Rough and Ready; March to the Sea; March to burn Columbia; Battle of Monroe's Crossroads; Battle of Averasborough; Battle of Bentonville

The 10th Michigan Infantry Regiment was an infantry regiment that served in the Union Army between February 10, 1862, and August 1, 1865, during the American Civil War.

== Service ==
The 10th Michigan Infantry was organized at Flint, Michigan, and mustered into federal service for a three-year enlistment on February 6, 1862.

The regiment was organized in Flint during the fall and winter of 1861–62 with men from the following counties: Shiawassee, Livingston, Genesee, Midland, Saginaw, Oakland, Sanilac, St. Clair, Lapeer, Jackson, Eaton, and Hillsdale. The regiment was officially mustered on February 6, 1862. It left the state on April 22, being ordered to Pittsburg Landing.

The regiment saw action at the Siege of Corinth. It was also engaged at Boonville in July; was then ordered to Nashville and assigned to the 1st brigade and 1st division of Rosecrans' army. It was engaged in provost, guard duty and fatigue duty at Nashville. On December 31 it guarded an ammunition train for the army, made a march of 54 miles (87 km) in 36 hours, and participated in the engagement at the Battle of Stones River. On January 3, 1863, Companies A and D were attacked by a large force of Confederate guerrillas, but repulsed them, killing 15 and capturing at least that same number. On January 25, 1863, a squad guarding a convoy was captured by 200 of Confederate cavalry. 27 men of the 10th being near, they went forward and routed the enemy with heavy loss, capturing guns and horses and saving most of the convoy, which had been set alight. On April 10, several hundred guerrillas drove a detail of 46 men away from another convoy they were guarding. Reinforced by 15 men, the guard returned and saved the convoy.

In August and September the regiment joined in the march from Murfreesboro to Columbia. The regiment then moved to Anderson's cross-roads, and then to Smith's ferry, which was reached on October 26. On November 26, it participated in the capture of Chickamauga Station.

The regiment moved towards Knoxville, marched for several days, but was then ordered to Columbus, reaching it on December 9. They moved through Stevenson, Huntsville, fought in the Athens, and Florence, skirmishing at the latter. It moved for Chattanooga on December 15. 395 men, having reenlisted as veterans on February 6, 1864, were expecting to receive the longed-for furlough. Instead, on February 23, the regiment was ordered to prepare for a movement into Georgia. The order was cheerfully obeyed and the regiment participated in the Battle of Buzzard's Roost, with 13 killed, 36 wounded and 17 missing. It made a gallant advance over two sharp ridges but, being unsupported, was compelled to return to its earlier stand. The 10th then took part in the successful counterattack at Tunnel Hill before being furloughed home in March. On its return, it reached Chattanooga on May 11, in time to take part in the Atlanta campaign. It was engaged at Resaca, Rome, and Dallas, and was in reserve at Kennesaw Mountain. When Confederate General John Bell Hood attacked in defense of Atlanta, the 10th fought valiantly at Peachtree Creek.

They also fought engagements at Sandtown and Red Oak. At Jonesboro they charged the enemy's works, taking 400 prisoners and a stand of colors, with 30 killed and 47 wounded. The regiment also fought at the Battle of Rough and Ready. Afterwards, it moved forward with the army on the Savannah campaign, engaging in skirmishes at Sandersville and Louisville. At Louisville, four companies defeated a superior force. The regiment reached Savannah on December 11 and moved into the city on December 21. It then participated in the Carolinas campaign, being engaged with the enemy at Fayetteville, Averasborough, Southfield Road, and Bentonville. It reached Richmond on May 7. The regiment was in the Grand Review at Washington D.C., moved to Louisville, Kentucky in June, and was mustered out on July 19.

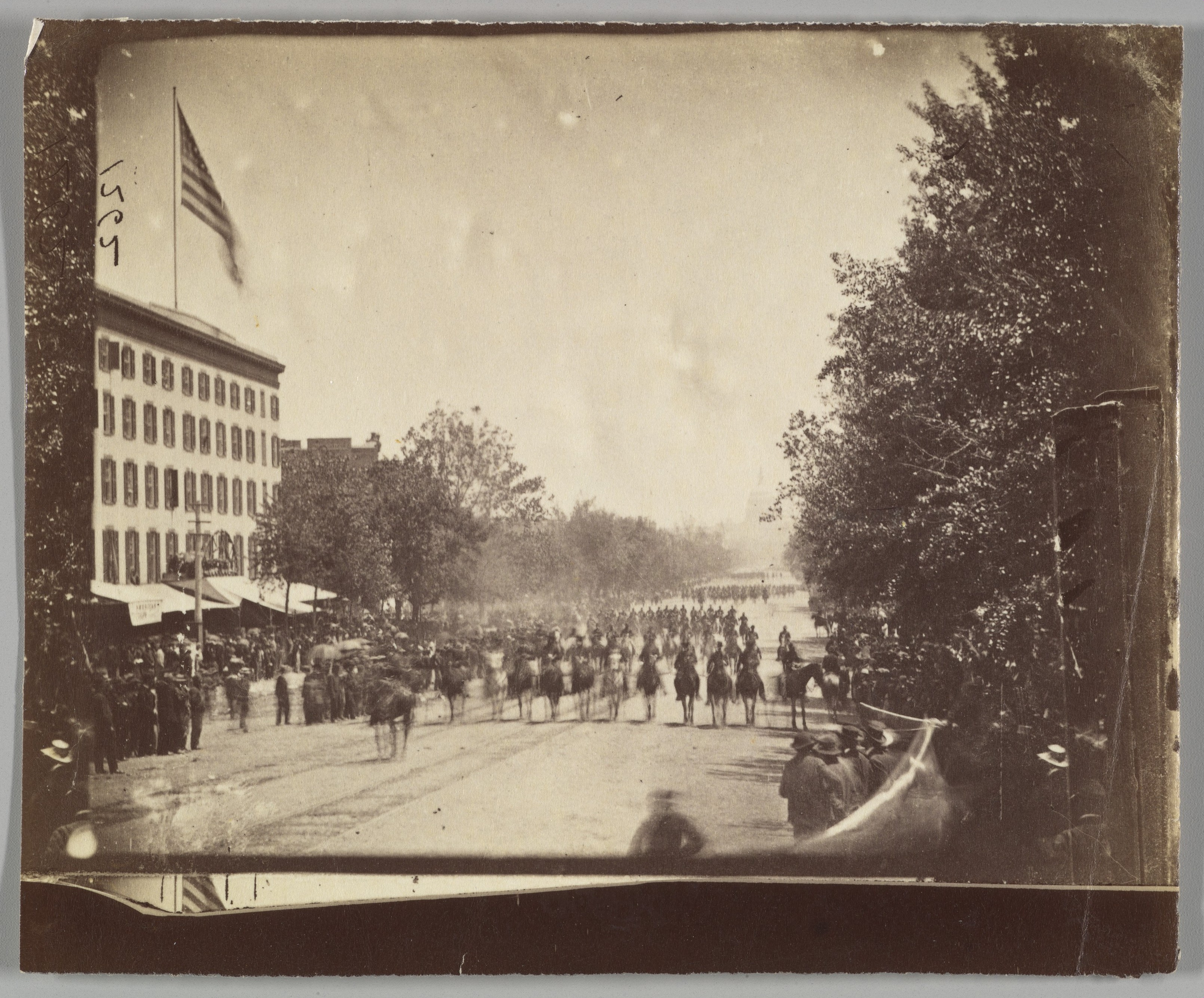
View of the Grand Review of the Armies in Washington, D.C.

The regiment was discharged on August 1, 1865, in Jackson, Michigan.

The Tenth Michigan Infantry is now represented by a Civil War reenactment group.

== Commanders ==
- Colonel Charles M. Lum
- Lieutenant-Colonel Christopher J. Dickerson
- Lieutenant-Colonel William H. Dunphy
- Major James J. Scarrett
- Major Henry S. Burnett
- Major Sylvan Ter Bush

== Total strength and casualties ==
The regiment had seven officers and 95 enlisted men killed in action or mortally wounded, and two officers and 223 enlisted men who died of disease, for a total of 327 fatalities. Its original strength was 997: gain by recruits, 791; total, 1,788. Loss by death, 299.
