= Eleazer A. Paine =

American lawyer

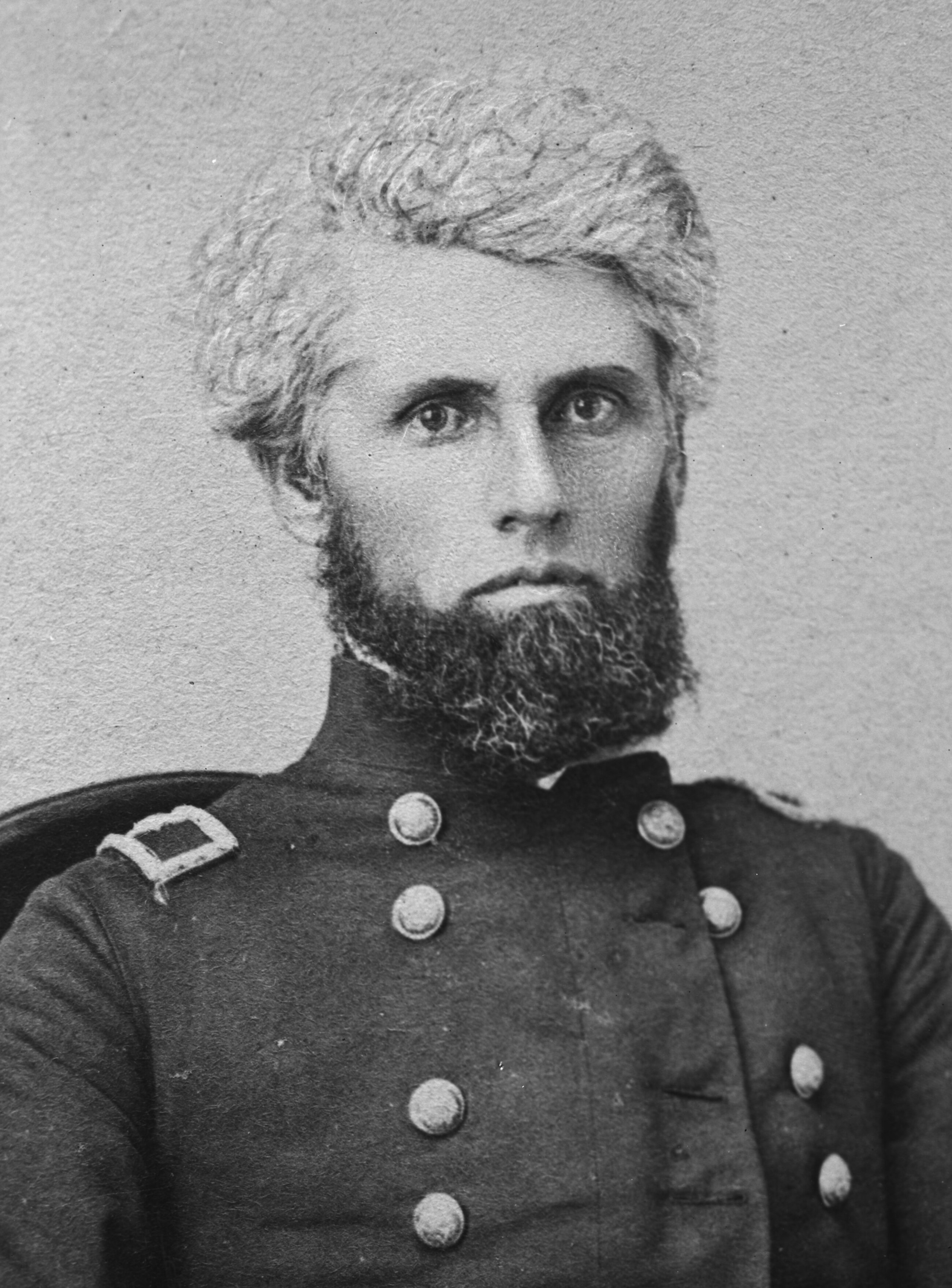
- Portrait of Paine
- Born: September 10, 1815; Geauga County, Ohio
- Died: December 16, 1882 (aged 67); Jersey City, New Jersey
- Burial place: Oakland Cemetery, Saint Paul, Minnesota
- Military career
- Allegiance: United States of America; Union
- Branch: United States Army, Union Army
- Service years: 1839–1840, 1861–1865
- Rank: Brigadier General
- Commands: 4th Division, Army of the Mississippi; District of West Kentucky
- Conflicts: Seminole Wars; American Civil War: Battle of New Madrid; Battle of Island Number Ten; Siege of Corinth; Battle of Fort Pillow
- Other work: Lawyer

Eleazer Arthur Paine (September 10, 1815 – December 16, 1882) was an American lawyer, author and a Union officer from Ohio. He provoked controversy as a brigadier general in the Union Army during the American Civil War, while commanding occupation troops in western Kentucky and Middle Tennessee in the 1860s. Paine was charged with brutality toward civilians and violating their civil rights. He was known to have suspected spies summarily executed in the town square of Gallatin, Tennessee while based there. He had directed the occupation's protection of railroads and policing of civilians in Middle Tennessee from there. He was replaced in April 1864.

== Early life and career ==
Paine was born in Geauga County, Ohio. He was a first cousin to Halbert E. Paine, also born in that county. (H. E. Paine also became Union general in the Civil War.)

After being educated in local schools, Paine received an appointment to the United States Military Academy and graduated in the Class of 1839 at West Point. He served in the Seminole Wars in Florida before resigning his commission in 1840. In 1843, Paine wrote and published a training manual entitled Military Instructions; Designed for the Militia and Volunteers.

== Law career ==
After resigning from the Army, Paine returned to Ohio. There he read the law with an established firm. He passed the bar exam in 1843, and established his practice in Painesville, Ohio, named after ancestors of his family.

In 1848 Paine moved further west to Monmouth, Illinois. There he married Charlotte Phelps and raised a family. One of Paine's close friends was fellow Illinois attorney Abraham Lincoln.

== Civil War ==
Following the outbreak of the Civil War, Paine was elected colonel of the 9th Illinois Infantry. In September 1861, he was appointed as a brigadier general of volunteers. He commanded a brigade at Paducah, Kentucky, a critical supply depot for the Federal army. There, Paine developed a reputation for harshness and cruelty toward the civilian populace. He ordered all guerrilla fighters caught within his territory to be executed.

Paine commanded the 4th Division of the Army of the Mississippi at the Battle of New Madrid and Island Number Ten in Missouri while leading the 1st Division. He also served in the Siege of Corinth under William S. Rosecrans.

He subsequently headed the District of West Kentucky, where his men were deployed guarding railroads from Confederate raiders from November 1862 until April 1864. His headquarters were in Gallatin, the seat of Sumner County in Middle Tennessee. It was a center of regional railroads. Tennessee was occupied by Union troops from 1862 into 1870. His son Phelps Paine was a captain in the Union Army and also assigned to Gallatin.

Paine, who was in command in heavily secessionist areas of Kentucky and Tennessee, was charged by some citizens with repressing and stealing from them. In addition to publicly executing suspected spies in the Gallatin town square, he was accused of what was called "chasing the fox with fresh horses"—having his men chase down and kill prisoners after they had been set free on old horses. Gallatin civilians referred to him as "our King" and "Tempest". Executions were commonplace, typically without benefit of a trial or legal counsel.

On April 29, 1864, Maj. Gen. William T. Sherman reassigned Paine and a regiment of his infantry to a post in Tullahoma, Tennessee, to guard bridges crossing the Duck and Elk rivers. Paine later commanded the military District of Illinois, but he resigned in November 1864 and was replaced by John Cook.

A special military commission investigating Paine's actions in Kentucky and Tennessee found him guilty on several counts, including corruption, extortion, unjust taxation, fencing stolen goods, sending innocent civilians to Canada, and immorality. Several modern historians have questioned the accuracy of the findings of this commission, as the investigators were aligned with the Union Democrats (pro-union, pro-slavery). But several of Paine's defenders were Unconditional Unionists (pro-union, anti-slavery). At this time the Purchase area of western Kentucky (where Paducah is located) was the only area of the Bluegrass State that was overwhelmingly pro-secession. Confederate cavalry and guerillas operated with impunity in much of the Purchase, and Paine believed he needed strict military rule to keep control.

Later Paine was subject to a full court martial on essentially the same charges. He was acquitted on all but a charge of cursing a superior officer. His punishment was to be reprimanded by the president of the United States in general orders. Secretary of War Edwin Stanton refused to enforce the sentence. According to Kentucky historian Berry Craig, "In the last analysis evidence is strong that the local animus toward Paine, perpetuated by nineteenth and twenty century historians, was rooted in his strongly held abolitionist views, in his support for the enlistments of African Americans into the Union forces and in his belief in black equality with whites."

Paine resigned from the Army in April 1865.

== Postwar years ==
Paine returned to his family in Illinois and resumed his law practice. Paine died in Jersey City, New Jersey. He is buried in Oakland Cemetery in Saint Paul, Minnesota.

In some accounts, his first name is spelled as "Eleazar." It is also recorded as "Eleazor." Spelling was variable in the 19th century.

== See also ==
- List of American Civil War generals (Union)
