= 60th Illinois Infantry Regiment =

60th Regiment Illinois Volunteer Infantry
- Illinois state flag
- Active: February 17, 1862, to July 31, 1865
- Country: United States
- Allegiance: Union
- Branch: United States Army
- Type: Infantry
- Size: 2877 Men, 10 Companies
- Engagements: Battle of Island Number Ten; Siege of Corinth; Battle of Rocky Face Ridge; Battle of Resaca; Battle of Dallas; Battle of New Hope Church; Battle of Kennesaw Mountain; Battle of Pine Hill; Battle of Peachtree Creek; Siege of Atlanta; Battle of Utoy Creek; Battle of Jonesboro; March to the Sea; Battle of Averasborough; Battle of Bentonville

The 60th Regiment Illinois Volunteer Infantry was an infantry regiment that served in the Union Army during the American Civil War.

== Overview ==
The regiment was organized at Camp Dubois, Illinois, and mustered on February 17, 1862. It moved to Cairo, Illinois, on February 22, 1862, and then to Island No. 10 in the Mississippi River on March 14. The unit was attached to the District of Cairo in March 1862. The unit became the 2nd Brigade of the 1st Division of the Army of the Mississippi until September 1862. 2nd Brigade, 13th Division, Army of the Ohio, to November 1862. 1st Brigade, 4th Division, Center 14th Army Corps, Army of the Cumberland, until January 1863. 1st Brigade, 4th Division, 14th Army Corps, to June 1863. 1st Brigade, 2nd Division, Reserve Corps, Army of the Cumberland, to October 1863. 1st Brigade, 2nd Division, 14th Army Corps, to July 1865.

== Service ==
Operations against Island Number 10, Mississippi River, March 14–April 8. Returned to Columbus, Ky., and Cairo, Ill., and thence moved to Hamburg Landing, Tenn., May 7–12. Advance on and siege of Corinth, Miss., May 12–30. Pursuit to Booneville, May 31–June 12. At Clear Creek until July. March to Tuscumbia, Ala., July 20–25, thence to Nashville, Tenn., August 28–September 15. Action at Columbia September 10. Siege of Nashville September 15-November 6. Repulse of Forrest's attack on Edgefield, November 5. Duty at Nashville, Tenn., until July 20, 1863. Skirmish at Edgefield November 7, 1862. Skirmish near Nashville January 3, 1863. Moved to Murfreesboro, Tenn., July 20; thence marched to Columbia, Athens, Huntsville, and Stevenson, Ala., August 24-September 7; and to Bridgeport, Ala., September 12. Duty there until October 1. Operations up the Sequatchie Valley against Wheeler October 1–17. Anderson's Cross Roads October 2 (Detachment). Moved to Waldron's Ridge, thence to Kelly's Ferry and guard lines of transportation until January 1864. Chattanooga-Ringgold Campaign November 23–27, 1863. Chickamauga Station, November 26. March to relief of Knoxville, Tenn., November 28-December 24. At Rossville, Ga., until May 1864. Demonstration on Dalton, Ga., February 22–27, 1864. Tunnel Hill, Buzzard's Roost, and Rocky Faced Ridge February 23–25. Atlanta (Ga.) Campaign May 1-September 8. Near Tunnel Hill May 5. Tunnel Hill May 6–7. Demonstration on Rocky Face Ridge, May 8–11. Buzzard's Roost Gap May 8–9. Battle of Resaca May 14–15. Rome May 17–18. Operations on the line of Pumpkin Vine Creek and battles about Dallas, New Hope Church, and Allatoona Hills May 25-June 5: Operations around Marietta and against Kenesaw Mountain June 10-July 2, Pine Hill June 11–14. Lost Mountain June 15–17. Assault on Kenesaw June 27. Ruff's or Vining Station, July 4, Chattahoochee River July 5–17. Peach Tree Creek July 19–20. Siege of Atlanta July 22-August 25. Utoy Creek August 5–7. Flank movement on Jonesboro, August 25–30. Battle of Jonesboro, August 31-September 1. Lovejoy Station, September 2–6. Operations in North Georgia and North Alabama against Forrest and Hood, September 29-November 3. Florence, Ala., October 6–7. March to the Sea, November 15–December 10. Siege of Savannah December 10–21. Campaign of the Carolinas January to April 1865. Fayetteville, N.C., March 13. Averysboro, Taylor's Hole Creek, March 16. Battle of Bentonville March 19–21. Occupation of Goldsboro, March 24. Advance on Raleigh April 10–14. Occupation of Raleigh April 14. Bennett's House April 26. Surrender of Johnston and his army. March to Washington, D.C., via Richmond, Va., April 29-May 19. Grand Review May 24. Moved to Louisville, Ky., on June 12. Provost guard at headquarters, 14th Army Corps, until July 31. Mustered out July 31, 1865.

== Companies ==
Company A - Union County, Company B - Union County, Company C - Jefferson and Washington counties, Company D - Hamilton and Jefferson counties, Company E - Williamson County, Company F - Richland and Union counties, Company G - Hamilton, Jefferson, Wayne counties, Company H - Pope, Johnson and Wayne counties, Company I - Jefferson County, Company K - Johnson County, Unassigned Recruits.

== Total strength and casualties ==
The regiment consisted of 2,877 men in ten companies. The regiment suffered two officers and 44 enlisted men who were killed in action or mortally wounded and four officers and 225 enlisted men who died of disease, for a total of 275 fatalities.

== Commanders ==
- Colonel Silas C. Toler - died on March 2, 1863.
- Colonel William B. Anderson - resigned on December 26, 1864.
- Lieutenant Colonel George W. Evans - mustered out with the regiment.

== See also ==
- List of Illinois Civil War Units
- Illinois in the American Civil War
