= 64th Illinois Infantry Regiment =

64th Regiment Illinois Volunteer Infantry "Yates' Sharpshooters"
- Active: December 1861 to July 18, 1865
- Country: United States
- Allegiance: Union
- Branch: Infantry
- Engagements: Battle of New Madrid; Expedition Against Fort Pillow; Siege of Corinth; Battle of Chambers Creek; Battle of Iuka; Battle of Corinth; Battle of Resaca; Battle of Dallas; Battle of New Hope Church; Battle of Kennesaw Mountain; Nickajack Creek; Battle of Atlanta; Siege of Atlanta; Battle of Jonesborough; Battle of Lovejoy's Station; 2nd Snake Creek Gap; Skirmish at Cedar Gap; March to the Sea; Skirmish at Poole's Station; Siege of Savannah; Carolinas campaign Crossing of Salkahatchie; Battle of Bentonville; Occupation of Raleigh

The 64th Regiment Illinois Volunteer Infantry, nicknamed "Yates' Sharpshooters" was an infantry regiment that served in the Union Army during the American Civil War.

== Total strength and casualties ==
The regiment suffered 6 officers and 106 enlisted men who were killed in action or mortally wounded and 2 officers and 131 enlisted men who died of disease, for a total of 242 fatalities.

== Commanders ==
- Lieutenant Colonel David E. Williams - Commanded from mustering of the regiment until his departure on sick leave on May 17, 1862. Lt. Colonel Williams never returned to the unit, and was discharged on September 11, 1862.
- Major Frederick W. Matteson - Took command of the battalion from Lt. Colonel Williams' departure, until he also took ill and died in hospital on April 8, 1862.
- Colonel John Morrill - Originally commanding officer of Co "A," Captain Morrill took command after Major Matteson's death. Captain Morrill was subsequently promoted to Lt. Colonel in command of the battalion. After the 64th Illinois was expanded to regimental size, he was promoted to Colonel. He commanded the regiment until he was severely wounded during the July 22, 1864 Battle of Atlanta. Meritoriously breveted Brigadier General
- Lt. Colonel Michael W. Manning - From July 22, 1864, to November 12, 1864.
- Captain Joseph Smith Reynolds - From November 12, 1864, to muster-out. After taking command, Captain Reynolds was promoted to Lt. Colonel and subsequently breveted Brigadier General.

== See also ==
- List of Illinois Civil War Units
- Illinois in the American Civil War
