= Army of the Mississippi =

- Active: February 23, 1862 – October 1863
- Country: United States of America
- Branch: United States Army
- Type: Field Army
- Engagements: American Civil War

Army of the Mississippi was the name given to two Union armies that operated around the Mississippi River, both with short existences, during the American Civil War.

== History ==
=== 1862 ===
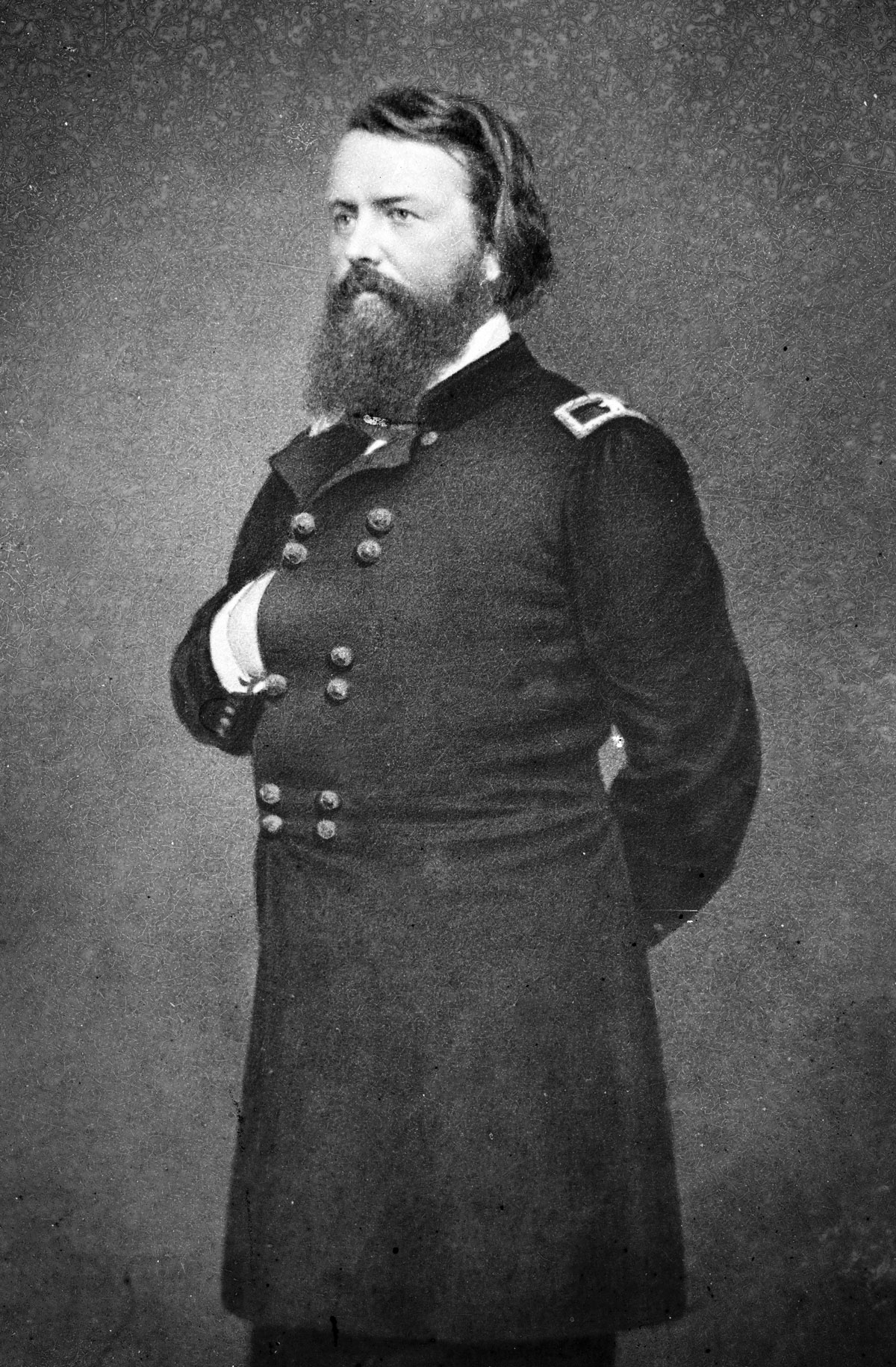
General John Pope was the first commander of the Army of the Mississippi

The first army was created on February 23, 1862, with Maj. Gen. John Pope in command. At its creation, the army consisted of 2 divisions of infantry for service along the Mississippi River. When General Pope began to move against New Madrid, Missouri, the army was expanded with units from neighboring military districts. The army now totaled 5 divisions commanded respectively by David S. Stanley, Schuyler Hamilton, John M. Palmer, Eleazar A. Paine and Joseph B. Plummer. Gordon Granger commanded the Cavalry Division of two regiments and Napoleon B. Buford commanded the "Flotilla Brigade". In this capacity the Army fought at the Battle of Island Number Ten.

After the capture of Island No. Ten, the army's divisions were consolidated into 3 divisions and became the "Left Wing" of Maj. Gen. Henry Halleck's Western Army Group. General Jefferson C. Davis's division from the Army of the Southwest was added, becoming the 4th Division. During the Siege of Corinth the Army of the Mississippi was consolidated into two wings of two divisions each. Maj. Gen. William S. Rosecrans commanded the "Left Wing" (1st and 2nd Divisions) and Brig. Gen. Schuyler Hamilton commanded the "Right Wing" (3rd and 4th Divisions). After the capture of Corinth, Pope was sent east to command the Army of Virginia and Maj. Gen. William S. Rosecrans assumed command of the Army of the Mississippi. The army was posted to the city of Corinth. Its position there was strengthened by two divisions from the Army of West Tennessee and fought at the battles of Iuka and Corinth. Rosecrans was transferred to command of the Army of the Ohio and the current army was discontinued in October 1862 and the regiments were dispersed between the XIII Corps and XIV Corps.

=== 1863 ===
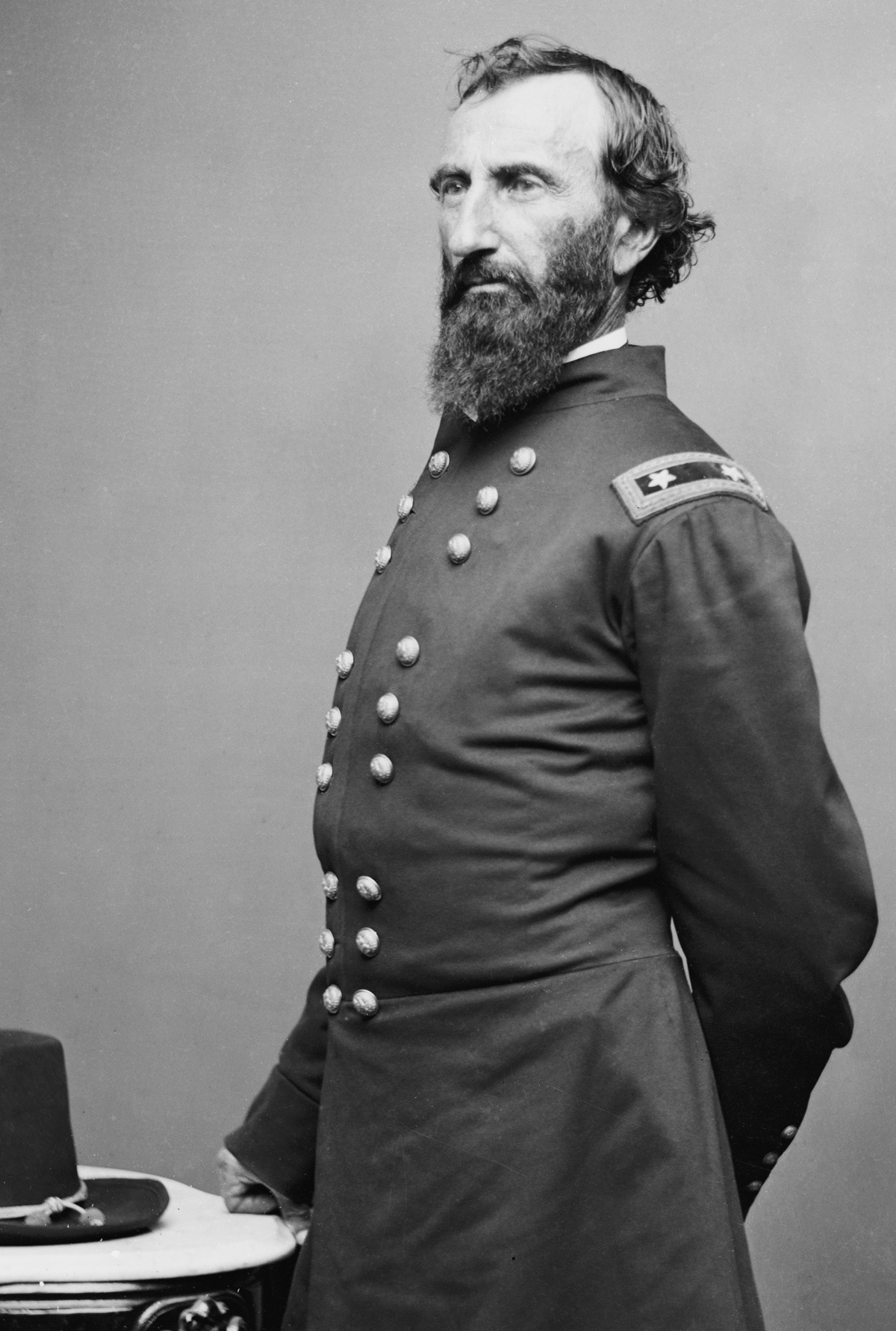
General John McClernand was the final officer to use the name "Army of the Mississippi" for a field unit

In 1863 Maj. Gen. John A. McClernand was put in command of the expedition against down the Mississippi. He was given command of two corps from the Army of the Tennessee, his own XIII Corps led by Brig. Gen. George W. Morgan and Maj. Gen. William T. Sherman's XV Corps. McClernand named his force the "Army of the Mississippi" and redesignated the XIII Corps the I Corps, Army of the Mississippi, and the XV Corps became the II Corps, Army of the Mississippi. McClernand was successful in capturing Arkansas Post. Maj. Gen. Ulysses S. Grant did not like McClernand and after Sherman and Admiral Andrew H. Foote both voiced their opinions that McClernand was unfit to command, Grant personally took command of the expedition against Vicksburg and the old XIII Corps and XV Corps were returned to the Army of the Tennessee on January 12, 1863.

== Command history ==
1862

Commander	From	To	Major Battles and Campaigns
Brigadier General John Pope	February 23, 1862	June 26, 1862	New Madrid, Island No. 10, Siege of Corinth
Brigadier General William S. Rosecrans	June 26, 1862	24 October 1862	Iuka, Corinth

1863

Commander	From	To	Major Battles
Major General John A. McClernand	January 4, 1863	January 12, 1863	Arkansas Post
