= John P. McCown =

Confederate general of the American Civil War (1815 –1879)

John Porter McCown
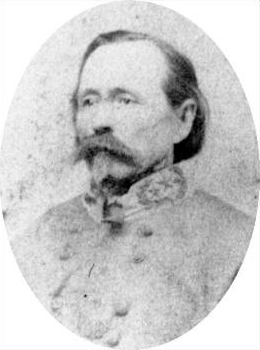
- John Porter McCown
- Born: August 19, 1815; Sevier County, Tennessee
- Died: January 22, 1879; Little Rock, Arkansas
- Relatives: Father: George Wesly McCown; Mother: Mary Caroline Porter
- Military career
- Allegiance: United States of America; Confederate States of America
- Branch: United States Army; Confederate States Army
- Service years: 1840–1861 (USA); 1861–1865 (CSA)
- Rank: Captain (USA); Major General
- Commands: Army of the West
- Conflicts: Mexican–American War; Seminole Wars; American Civil War

John Porter McCown (August 19, 1815 – January 22, 1879) was a Confederate general during the American Civil War and a career U.S. Army officer who saw fighting in the Mexican–American War and in the Seminole Wars.

== Early life and career ==
John Porter McCown was born near the town of Sevierville, located in Sevier County, Tennessee. In September 1835 he entered the United States Military Academy at West Point, and graduated in July 1840 standing tenth out of 42 cadets. McCown was commissioned a second lieutenant and assigned to the 4th U.S. Artillery. He was promoted to first lieutenant on September 30, 1843. McCown then participated in the U.S. Army's military occupation of Texas in 1845 and 1846.

McCown fought during the Mexican–American War and participated in the Battle of Cerro Gordo near Xalapa, Veracruz. He was brevetted to captain on April 18, 1847, for his conduct in that battle. He served as the 4th Artillery's Regimental Quartermaster from March 29, 1847 to January 12, 1849.

After the war McCown served along the Rio Grande on frontier duty, and he was promoted to captain on January 9, 1851. During this time, McCown collected birds in the area, most of which he sent to ornithologist George Lawrence. Three of these species were found to be new to science and one, the McCown's longspur, was named in his honor; it has since been renamed the thick-billed longspur due to McCown's connection to the Confederacy. McCown also wrote a paper on the greater roadrunner in 1853.

In 1856 and 1857 McCown fought during the Seminole Wars in Florida, and in 1858 he was part of the Utah War. He then was on garrison duty in the Nebraska Territory as well as in the Dakota Territory from 1858 into 1861.

== Civil War service ==
McCown chose to follow the Confederate cause and resigned his U.S. Army commission on May 17, 1861. He was appointed a captain in the artillery of the Confederate Army on March 16, and then promoted to lieutenant colonel on May 9. Also in 1861 he was in charge of a Confederate infantry brigade under the command of Gideon J. Pillow.

He was sent to the Western Theater and appointed a colonel in the Tennessee artillery on May 17. He was promoted to brigadier general on October 12, and he marched his brigade to Columbus, Kentucky, and on to the Battle of Belmont on November 7.

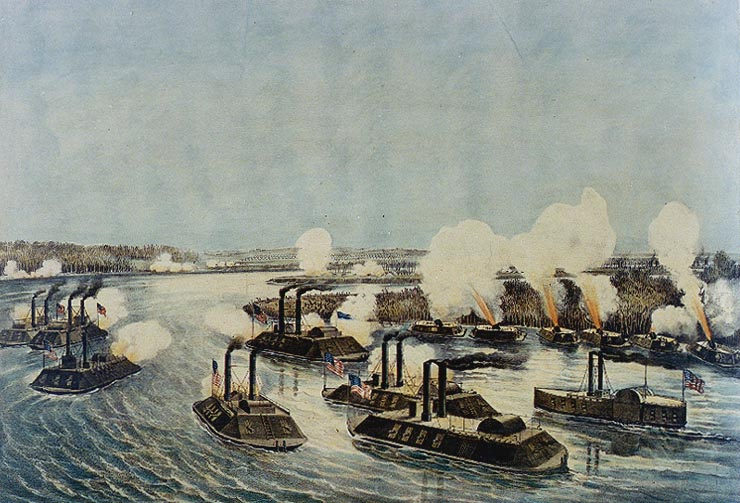
Battle of Island Number Ten

Starting on March 3, garrison commander Brig. Gen. McCown, defended New Madrid and Island No. 10 from a siege by the Union's Army of the Mississippi under command of Brig. Gen John Pope. McCown was promoted to Major General on March 10, 1862, and ordered the evacuation of positions at New Madrid to Island No 10. on the evening of March 13 after several days of siege. McCown was criticized for abandoning arms and supplies in a hasty withdrawal from positions at New Madrid. Amid the criticism, McCown was accused of drunkenness and was replaced by William W. Mackall during the Battle of Island Number Ten. However, McCown was later vindicated by an April 4 letter from Henry S. Foote's son Henry S. Foote Jr. that attributed the rumors circulated because of McCown's brother "who I'm told drinks freely" and because of jealousy at McCown's recent promotion. Foote called his son's letter a "patriotic act" in "these days of general fault finding and vulgar crimination". Following the surrender of the Confederate garrisons after the battle, he commanded the 2nd Division of the Army of the West from April until June 20, when he assumed overall command of the Army of the West.

McCown Battle Flag - Resembles the Flag of Scotland

On June 27, McCown's command was added to the Second Corps of the Army of Mississippi. General Bragg consolidated the Army of Kentucky and the Army of Mississippi into one force known as the Confederate Army of Tennessee, and McCown's division was made part of Lt. Gen. William J. Hardee's Corps. The Army of Tennessee fought at the Battle of Stones River at Murfreesboro near the end of 1862. McCown and other senior generals petitioned Jefferson Davis to relieve General Braxton Bragg in favor of Gen. Joseph E. Johnston. Davis refused to relieve either Bragg or the rebellious generals. McCown ran afoul of Braxton Bragg, who blamed McCown for the loss of New Madrid and labeled him "his worst division commander". In March 1863 Bragg had McCown court-martialed, ostensibly for disobeying orders at Murfreesboro, but more likely for criticism of Bragg and Confederate officials, including Davis. McCown was relieved of his command as the commanding general of the Army and was tried and found guilty of disobedience of orders on March 16, and sentenced to suspension from duty for a period of six months. McCown declared the Confederacy was nothing more than "a damned stinking cotton oligarchy... gotten up for the benefit of Isham G. Harris and Jefferson Davis and their damned corrupt cliques." That May, most of his command was sent for service in Starkville.

By 1865 McCown was in North Carolina. In April he defended a Catawba River crossing near Morganton. McCown held the crossing against the Union cavalry division of Brig. Gen. Alvan C. Gillem with about 300 soldiers and one artillery piece. After the war he was paroled from Salisbury on May 12.

== Postbellum ==
Following the war, McCown became a teacher in Knoxville, Tennessee. Later he moved to Magnolia, Arkansas, and took up farming. In 1870 he moved to Little Rock, again engaged in farming. McCown died in Little Rock in 1879 and was buried in City Cemetery in Magnolia.

A bird, McCown's longspur (Rhynchophanes mccownii), was named in his honor in 1851, after he collected the type specimen. In 2020, it was renamed "thick-billed longspur" by the American Ornithological Society, due to his Confederate associations.

== See also ==
- List of American Civil War generals (Confederate)
- McCown Guards: A Confederate Army artillery battery during the American Civil War.
