= August Heinrich Lehmann =

American politician

August Heinrich Lehmann (born May 29, 1842) was an American restaurateur from Hustisford, Wisconsin who served a single one-year term as a member of the Wisconsin State Assembly from Dodge County.

== Background ==
Lehmann was born in the village of Alt-Küstrinchen in the Kingdom of Prussia on May 29, 1842. He received a common school education. He came to Wisconsin in 1858, and eventually settled in Hustisford, where he became a restaurateur. In 1864 he married Auguste Schwensow (1844-1920) of Hustisford, a native of Brandenburg.

== Legislative service ==
In 1873 he was elected as Assemblyman for Dodge County's 5th district (the Towns of Herman, Hubbard, Hustisford and Rubicon) as a member of the new Liberal Reform Party, with 495 votes, to 462 for Independent Beder Wood and 219 for Republican C. A. Melcher (Democratic incumbent Satterlee Clark, Jr. was not a candidate). He was assigned to the joint committee on local legislation.

He was not a candidate for re-election in 1874, and was succeeded by Democrat William M. Morse. (There was no Reform candidate in the race.)

== Personal life ==
When Auguste died in 1920 of dropsy, Lehmann was still alive. The couple had five children, 19 grandchildren and three great-grandchildren
