= William W. Mackall =

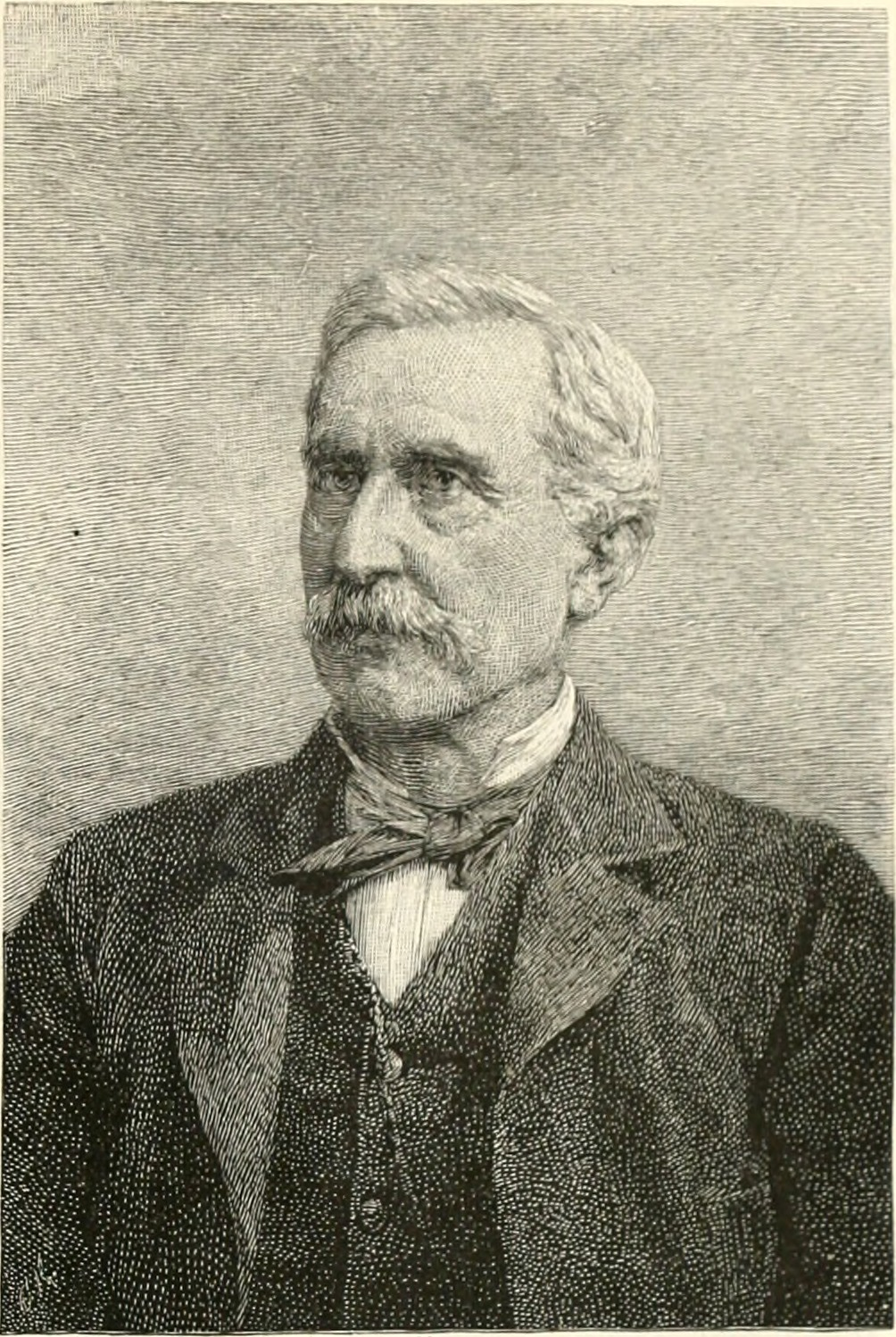
- Born: January 18, 1817; Cecil County, Maryland
- Died: August 12, 1891 (aged 74); Langley, Virginia
- Burial place: McLean, Virginia
- Military career
- Allegiance: United States of America; Confederate States of America
- Branch: United States Army; Confederate States Army
- Service years: 1837–1861 (USA); 1861–1865 (CSA)
- Rank: Brevet Major (USA); Brigadier General (CSA)
- Conflicts: Mexican–American War; American Civil War

William Whann Mackall (January 18, 1817 – August 12, 1891) was a Seminole Wars veteran, Mexican–American War veteran and Confederate States Army brigadier general during the American Civil War. He was a United States Army officer for 24 years before he resigned his commission in order to join the Confederate Army. After the Civil War, he was a farmer in Fairfax County, Virginia.

== Early life ==
William W. Mackall was born on January 18, 1817, in Georgetown, Washington, D. C., By 1822, the family had settled in Cecil County, living on Wilna, a property at the edge of Childs, Maryland. He graduated 8th of 50 cadets in the United States Military Academy class of 1837. Mackall married the sister of later Confederate Brigadier General Gilbert Moxley Sorrel.

After his graduation from West Point, Mackall was commissioned a second lieutenant of the U.S. Army's 1st Regiment of Artillery. He was promoted to first lieutenant on July 9, 1838. Mackall was ambushed and severely wounded at River Inlet, Florida on February 11, 1839, during the Second Seminole War. He was regimental adjutant between January 20, 1840, and August 31, 1841.

Mackall was appointed brevet captain and brevet major for gallantry during the Mexican–American War where he fought in the battles of Monterey, Contreras, Churubusco and Chapultepec. He served as an assistant adjutant general during the war. Mackall was wounded in the arm at the Battle of Chapultepec on September 13, 1847. After the war, Mackall continued to serve as an assistant adjutant general on the frontier, in the U.S. Army's Eastern Division and Department of the Pacific. He held the position of assistant adjutant general in the Department of the Pacific on May 11, 1861, when he declined promotion to lieutenant colonel and assistant adjutant general. Mackall resigned from the U.S. Army on July 3, 1861.

== American Civil War ==
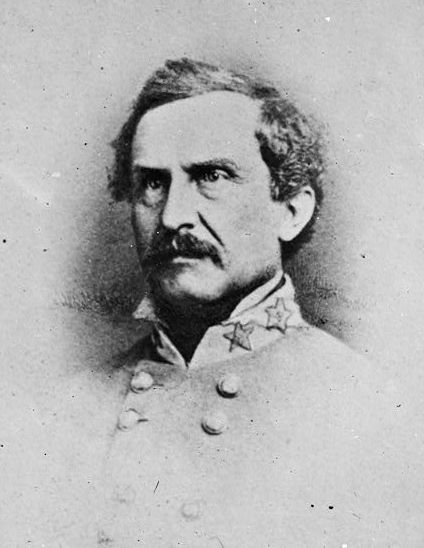
Lieut.-Col. William W. Mackall in uniform

William W. Mackall began his Confederate States Army service as a lieutenant colonel and assistant adjutant general on September 9, 1861, and was assigned to the Confederate Department Number Two on September 15, 1861. He became assistant adjutant general on the staff of General Albert Sidney Johnston. Mackall was promoted to brigadier general on March 6, 1862, to rank from February 27, 1862, through the influence of General P.G.T. Beauregard. Mackall had become disillusioned with Albert Sidney Johnston's performance and became a supporter of Beauregard.

Mackall replaced Brigadier General John P. McCown as commander of Confederate defenses on Island Number Ten in the Mississippi River on March 15, 1862. Soon thereafter, on April 7, 1862, Mackall was taken prisoner when the Union Army under Major General John Pope captured the island at the Battle of Island Number Ten. Mackall was exchanged on August 15, 1862. He then held a staff position as commissary of subsistence in the Department of East Tennessee between November 5, 1862, and December 8, 1862. Mackall was in command of the Confederate Department of the Gulf for six days in December 1862. Until mid-April, he served in command of the western part of the district after Major General Simon Bolivar Buckner was assigned to command the district and to fortify the defenses of Mobile, Alabama.

Between April 17, 1863, and October 12, 1863, Mackall served in the Army of Tennessee as chief of staff to General Braxton Bragg, his classmate at West Point. Mackall was relieved at his own request after the Battle of Chickamauga. Then, he commanded a brigade in Major General John H. Forney's division in the Confederate Department of Mississippi and East Louisiana between October 16, 1863, and January 26, 1864.

Between January 26, 1864, and August 24, 1864, Mackall served as chief of staff in the Army of Tennessee under General Joseph E. Johnston. Mackall declined to serve with the Army of Tennessee when General John Bell Hood replaced General Johnston. After the end of his service with the Army of Tennessee on August 24, 1864, Mackall was inactive at Macon, Georgia. He was in command of Confederate forces in south Georgia between March 23, 1865, and April 20, 1865, when he was captured by Union troops at Macon, but he saw no active service during this time. No record of his parole has been found.

== Aftermath ==
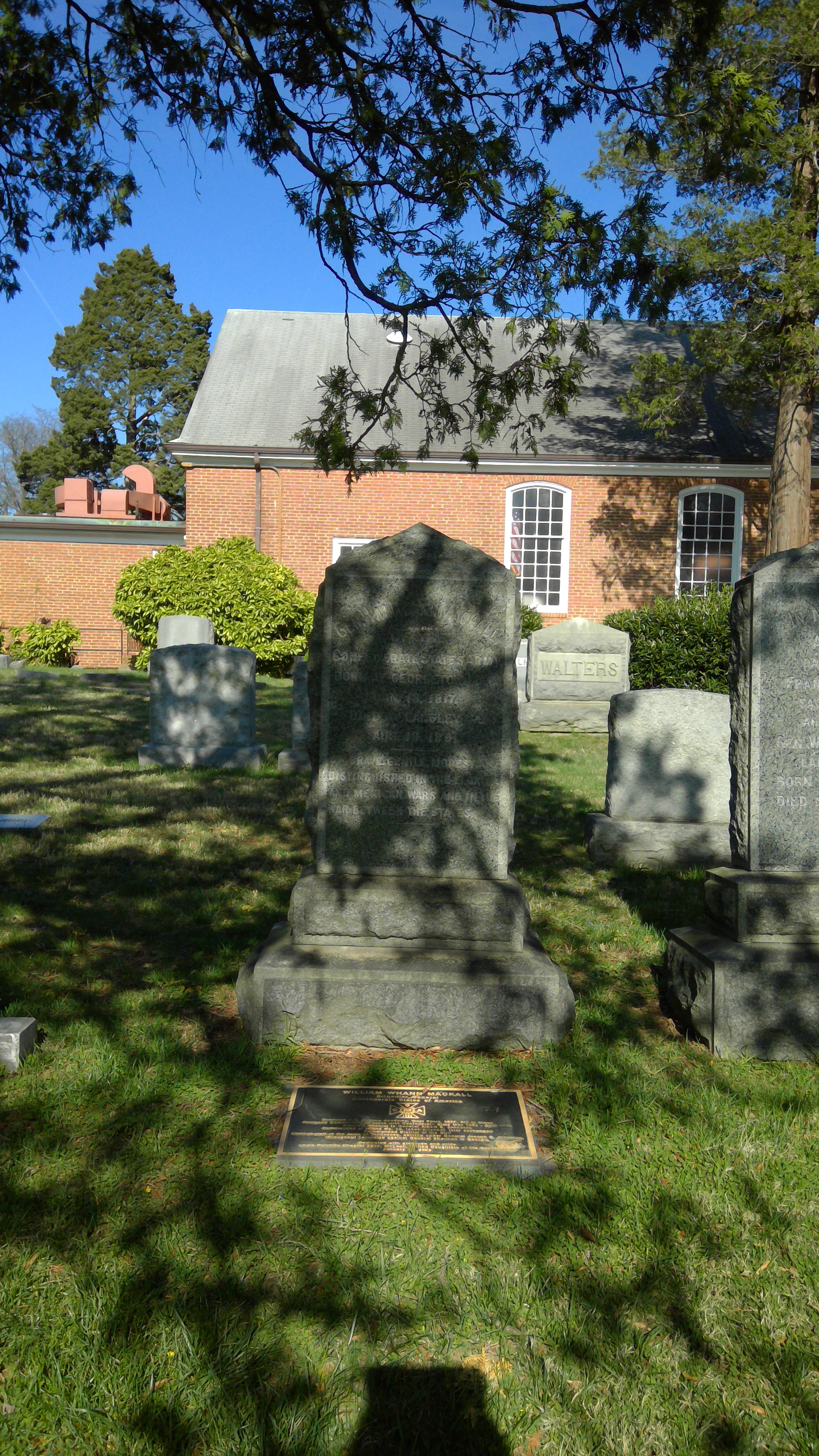
Mackall's grave in Fairfax County, Virginia

Mackall speculated in real estate and owned several farms in Fairfax County, Virginia after the war. William W. Mackall died on August 12, 1891, at "Langley," one of his farms in Fairfax County. He is buried at Lewinsville Presbyterian Church Cemetery, McLean, Virginia, on the site of "Lewinsville," another of his farms.

== See also ==
- List of American Civil War generals (Confederate)
