= Temple Clark =

American politician and Union Army officer (1826–1893)

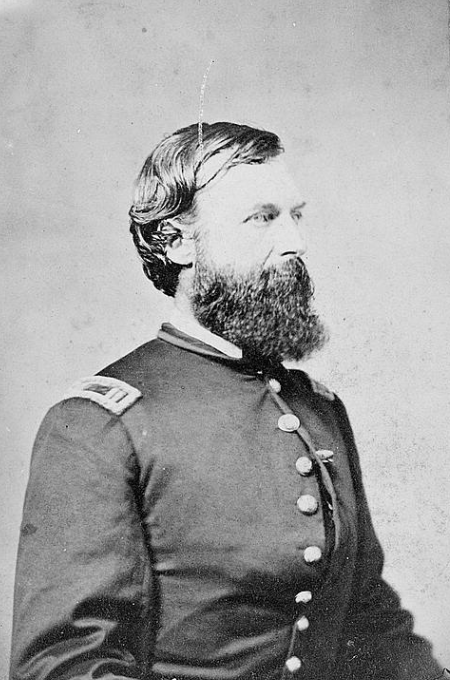

Member of the Wisconsin Senate from the 19th district
- In office January 5, 1857 – January 3, 1859
- Preceded by: William J. Gibson
- Succeeded by: Samuel H. Thurber

Personal details
- Born: October 23, 1826 Oneida County, New York, U.S.
- Died: April 4, 1893 (aged 66) Washington, D.C., U.S.
- Resting place: Arlington National Cemetery, Arlington, Virginia
- Party: Democratic
- Spouse: Annie Strong (m. 1847, divorced)
- Relatives: Satterlee Clark (brother); Joseph B. Plummer (brother-in-law)

Military service
- Allegiance: United States
- Branch/service: United States Army; Union Army
- Years of service: 1847–1848; 1861–1863
- Rank: Colonel, USV; Major Gen. (Wis. Militia)
- Unit: 2nd Reg. Ill. Vol. Infantry; 5th Reg. Wis. Vol. Infantry
- Battles/wars: Mexican–American War: Battle of Buena Vista; American Civil War: Peninsula campaign (Cpt. Co. A, 5th Wis.); Siege of Corinth (Adjutant); Battle of Iuka (Adjutant); Second Battle of Corinth (Adjutant, W.I.A.)

Temple Clark (October 23, 1826 – April 4, 1893) was an American attorney, Democratic politician, Union Army officer, and Wisconsin pioneer. He served two years in the Wisconsin Senate (1857 & 1858), representing Manitowoc and Calumet counties, and served as an adjutant on the staff of General William Rosecrans during the American Civil War.

== Early life ==
Temple Clark was the youngest son of U.S. Army major Satterlee Clark of Vermont, an 1807 graduate of the United States Military Academy and a veteran of the War of 1812. Major Clark married Frances Whitcroft, the daughter of a Maryland politician, Burton Whitcroft. Following the War, the elder Clark was assigned to work as a paymaster for the Army in Washington, D.C., and was reassigned to Utica, New York, in 1821. Temple Clark was born while the family was living in the vicinity of Utica, in 1826.

Major Clark and his eldest son, Satterlee Clark Jr., traveled to Green Bay in 1828 to take up the duties of sutler for Fort Howard. In 1838, at age 12, Temple Clark and the remainder of his family came west to join his father and brother in the Wisconsin Territory. Around 1840, Clark moved to live with his older brother, Satterlee Clark, Jr., at Fort Winnebago, where he had been working as sutler clerk. Both Clarks left the fort in 1843.

== Mexican–American War ==
At the outbreak of the Mexican–American War in 1846, Temple was residing at St. Louis, where he enlisted with the 2nd Illinois Volunteer Infantry Regiment under Colonel William Henry Bissell. He marched with the army of General John E. Wool through Texas and Mexico, participating in the Battle of Buena Vista, and returned to Wisconsin in 1847.

== Political career ==
Shortly after returning from the war, Clark was admitted to the bar and began a legal practice at Berlin, Wisconsin. He later resided for a time at Ceresco, Wisconsin, which was Fourierist commune in western Fond du Lac County. In 1853, however, he was appointed harbor agent at Manitowoc, Wisconsin, and relocated there. A few months after his arrival at Manitowoc, the federal government approved an appropriation for improving the harbor, and Clark gained significant patronage through awarding the contracts to complete the work. By 1856, he had also become an investor and officer in the Manitowoc and Calumet Village Plank Road Company.

Clark was also active in the Democratic Party and, in 1856, was elected to the Wisconsin State Senate from the 19th district, which the previous year had been redistricted to contain Calumet and Manitowoc counties. Prior to 1857, Manitowoc and Calumet had shared a Senate district with more populous Sheboygan County, and had always been represented in the Senate by a Sheboyganite. Clark, as a Democrat, was in the minority during the 10th and 11th legislatures and had an unremarkable term. Possibly the most noteworthy anecdote of his Senate term was that he was involved in a physical altercation with Madison Patriot publisher Stephen Decatur Carpenter on the grounds of the State Capitol.

In 1858, Clark ran for Wisconsin State Assembly in Manitowoc County's 1st Assembly district, but was defeated by Republican William Aldrich.

== Civil War service ==
Also in 1858, the Wisconsin Militia was reorganized by new Adjutant General Amasa Cobb, creating several new geographic divisions. Cobb and Governor Alexander Randall appointed Clark to serve as Major General for the 8th Division of the Wisconsin Militia, which comprised Manitowoc, Calumet, Brown, and Kewaunee counties. He served in this capacity until the outbreak of the American Civil War.

As news arrived of the attack on Fort Sumter, Clark was one of several Democrats moved by patriotic fervor to join the Union cause. Clark immediately began recruiting a company of volunteers from Manitowoc County, known as the Manitowoc Guard, and by May 1, 1861, the company had been accepted by Governor Randall for enrollment into Wisconsin's volunteer force. (Note: On May 1, 1861, Captain Temple Clark issued the following proclamation to citizens: "The company of volunteers from this county has been accepted by the governor and the officers commissioned. The company will be clothed and equipped at the expense of the state as soon as they are assigned to a regiment and ordered to rendezvous; in the meantime they will be kept under constant drill and such of them as do not belong in the village will be boarded at the expense of the state." —A History of Manitowoc County, p. 115) The company was organized into the 5th Wisconsin Infantry Regiment and rendezvoused with the other companies at Camp Randall, in Madison, Wisconsin. The regiment mustered into service July 13, 1861, under Colonel Amasa Cobb. Clark's company was made Company A of the regiment, and Clark was designated senior captain of the regiment. The regiment proceeded to Washington, D.C., for service in the eastern theater of the war.

In Washington, the regiment was assigned to construct fortifications and maintain a picket until March 1862, when they commenced a march with General George B. McClellan's Peninsula campaign. Captain Clark, however, left the regiment in early April 1862, as he was appointed adjutant on the staff of his brother-in-law Brigadier General Joseph B. Plummer in the Army of the Mississippi. He arrived in time to participate at the Siege of Corinth. General Plummer had earlier been wounded in battle, and died of his wounds and prolonged exposure in August. On Plummer's death, General William Rosecrans, commanding the Army of the Mississippi, took Captain Clark onto his staff.

He participated with Rosecrans at the Battle of Iuka and the Second Battle of Corinth, where he was wounded three times. He was mentioned in General Rosecrans correspondence after the battle for meritorious conduct. His most serious wound was a gunshot through the lung, which was thought to be a mortal wound. He lie in the hospital near death for several weeks, but ultimately recovered, though he suffered lingering effects from the wound.

Clark returned to service in January 1863, and was assigned as an adjutant to General Richard W. Johnson in the Army of the Cumberland, but had to resign due to disability in July 1863.

== Postbellum career ==
After the war, Clark resided for a time at New York City and was active in the Military Order of the Loyal Legion of the United States. In the 1870s, he was appointed to the United States Secret Service as a detective. In that capacity, in 1872, he was fined for drunk and disorderly conduct while on government business in Minneapolis, Minnesota.

Though Clark had always been a Democrat, he was a supporter of James A. Garfield in the 1880 United States presidential election, due to their time together on the staff of General Rosecrans. After Garfield was elected president, he appointed Clark to a clerkship position in the United States Department of Agriculture, where he remained until his death in 1893.

Clark was buried with military honors at Arlington National Cemetery.

== Personal life and family ==
Although his father, Major Satterlee Clark, was well-regarded early in his military career, he suffered from alcoholism. Major Clark was dismissed from service in 1824, and was considered a debtor to the government due to poor bookkeeping as paymaster in Utica. Shortly after his firing, he wrote in the press under the pseudonym "Hancock" making allegations of corruption against the man who had fired him, Secretary of War John C. Calhoun. The allegations resulted in a congressional investigation of Calhoun during his time as Vice President of the United States. Major Clark ultimately received a favorable judgement from the United States District Court for the Eastern District of New York, restoring some of the pay which had been withheld from him.

Temple Clark was the youngest of five children born to Major Clark and Frances Whitcroft. His eldest brother, Satterlee Clark Jr., was a prominent leader of the Democratic Party in Wisconsin and stridently opposed to the Civil War, he served ten years in the Wisconsin State Senate through the 1860s. His sister, Frances, married Joseph B. Plummer, who was Clark's superior officer in the Army of the Mississippi.

Temple Clark's grandfather was Isaac Clark, an American militia officer in the American Revolutionary War who rose to the rank of lieutenant colonel.

== Notes ==
Wisconsin Senate
| Preceded by William J. Gibson | Member of the Wisconsin Senate from the 19th district January 5, 1857 – January 3, 1859 | Succeeded by Samuel H. Thurber |
