= Benjamin Spaulding =

American politician

Benjamin B. Spaulding was an American physician from Arcade (now Brooklyn), Wisconsin who spent a single one-year term as a Free Soil member of the Wisconsin State Assembly from Marquette and Waushara counties, which included the area which is now Green Lake County.

== Background ==
Spaulding came to Wisconsin in 1844 from Massachusetts and was the first doctor in the Ripon area.

== Political office ==
Spaulding was elected in 1849 as a member of the Free Soil Party, organized the year before, to serve in the third session of the Assembly for the district including Marquette County and the newly created Waushara County, succeeding Democrat Satterlee Clark, Jr. He was succeeded for the 1851 session by Whig Charles Waldo. That session of the Assembly met from January 9 - February 11, 1850.

== After the legislature ==
As of 1862, the doctor was still engaged in the purchase of real estate from the state's public lands set aside to fund the university and public schools.

Both Spaulding Street in the City of Ripon, and Spaulding Hill in Green Lake County are named after the doctor. It is reported that when the American Civil War broke out, Spaulding's son enlisted in the United States Army; and that the family afterwards moved to Brooklyn, Connecticut.
