= William J. Gibson =

19th century American politician

Member of the Wisconsin Senate from the 19th district
- In office January 1, 1855 – January 5, 1857
- Preceded by: Benjamin Allen
- Succeeded by: Temple Clark

Member of the Wisconsin State Assembly from the Buffalo–Chippewa–Clark–Jackson–La Crosse district
- In office January 2, 1854 – January 1, 1855
- Preceded by: Albert D. La Due
- Succeeded by: Chase A. Stevens

Personal details
- Died: September 9, 1863 Columbus, Kentucky, U.S.
- Resting place: Oak Grove Cemetery, La Crosse, Wisconsin
- Party: Democratic
- Spouse: Elizabeth L. Jones (died–1896)
- Children: Mame G. (Scott); (b. 1862; died 1944)
- Profession: Physician

Military service
- Allegiance: United States
- Branch/service: United States Volunteers; Union Army
- Years of service: 1862–1863
- Rank: Major, USV
- Unit: 31st Reg. Wis. Vol. Infantry
- Battles/wars: American Civil War

William J. Gibson (died September 9, 1863) was an American medical doctor, politician, and Wisconsin pioneer. He was a member of the Wisconsin Senate (1855 & 1856) and State Assembly (1854) representing a large swathe of the then-lightly populated northwest Wisconsin. He was one of dozens of lawmakers in the 1856 session caught up in the La Crosse and Milwaukee Railroad bribery scheme. He died of disease while serving as a Union Army officer in the American Civil War.

== Biography ==
William J. Gibson came to Wisconsin some time before 1852. He first resided in Rock County, Wisconsin, but soon moved to Jackson County, Wisconsin. He was a candidate for the Democratic nomination for Wisconsin Senate in 1852, but did not receive the nomination. The next year, however, he received the Democratic nomination for Wisconsin State Assembly in his district and won election in the fall. At the time, his district comprised a wide swathe of western Wisconsin, encompassing all the territory from the northern border of Vernon County all the way to what is now the southern border of Bayfield County, excluding Pierce County and counties touching the Minnesota border north of Pierce.

In 1854, he won the Democratic nomination for Wisconsin Senate in his district—the 19th State Senate district. He was elected in the Fall, in the Senate, his district spanned from Crawford County to what is now Ashland County, comprising virtually all of western Wisconsin. After his term in the Senate, Gibson came to reside in La Crosse, Wisconsin.

Politically, Gibson was closely aligned with Albert D. La Due, who was a prominent Democrat in early western Wisconsin. They were supporters of Stephen A. Douglas and his Kansas–Nebraska Act.

Gibson, along with many Wisconsin legislators of 1856, was tainted by a corrupt railroad land grant scheme. Bribe recipients included the Governor, William A. Barstow, and dozens of state officials. Gibson was said to have received $38,000 worth of the corrupt railroad bonds (more than $1.38 million adjusted for inflation to 2023). Nevertheless, Gibson remained active in state politics and was a frequent attendee at Democratic conventions during this era.

In the second year of the American Civil War, Gibson volunteered for service in the Union Army and was commissioned major of the 31st Wisconsin Infantry Regiment, under Colonel Isaac E. Messmore. The regiment left Wisconsin on March 1, 1863, and went south by rail to Cairo, Illinois, then boarded boats and proceeded to Columbus, Kentucky. The regiment spent the summer and fall in Columbus on picket duty. They suffered significantly from disease during this time, with often half the regiment unfit for duty, causing four to eight deaths per week. It was during this wave of illness, in September 1863, that Gibson caught a fever and died within a matter of days. His wife and daughter came to retrieve his body and returned him to La Crosse, where he was buried.

Wisconsin State Assembly
Preceded by Albert D. La Due	Member of the Wisconsin State Assembly from the Buffalo–Chippewa–Clark–Jackson–La Crosse district January 2, 1854 – January 1, 1855	Succeeded by Chase A. Stevens
Wisconsin Senate
Preceded by Benjamin Allen	Member of the Wisconsin Senate from the 19th district January 1, 1855 – January 5, 1857	Succeeded by Temple Clark
