= Royal Colonial Boundary of 1665 =

Border between Virginia and the Province of Carolina

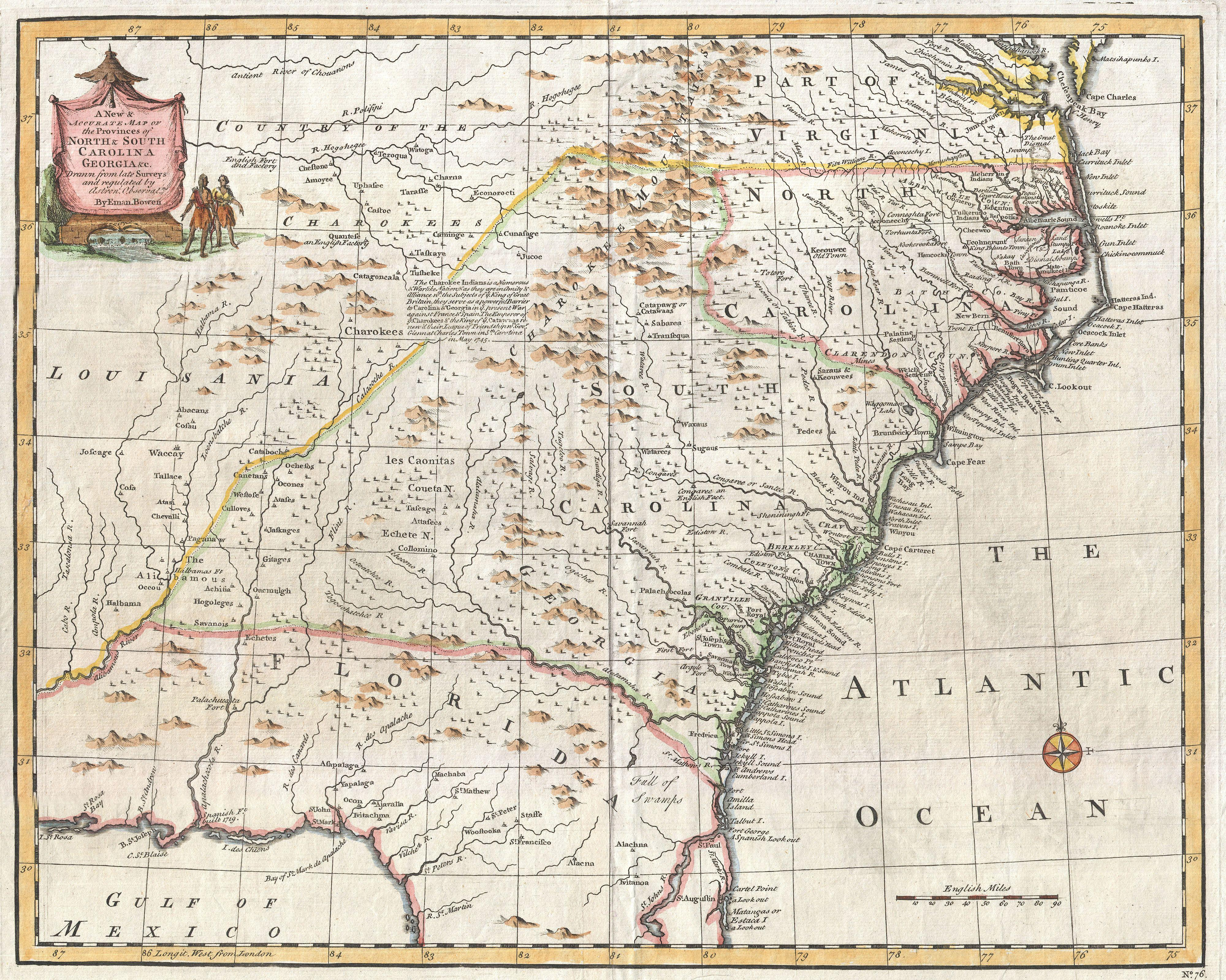
Emanuel Bowen's 1747 map showing the boundary between Virginia and North Carolina

The Royal Colonial Boundary of 1665 marked the border between the Colony of Virginia and the Province of Carolina from the Atlantic Ocean westward across North America. In addition, the English colony extended their boundaries to contain New Plymouth and Massachusetts. The line follows the parallel 36°30′ north latitude that later became a boundary for several US states as far west as the Oklahoma Panhandle, and also came to be associated with the Missouri Compromise of 1820.

It was a brainchild of King Charles II of England, and was intended to stretch from the Atlantic to the Pacific Ocean. Relating to King Charles II, New Plymouth and Massachusetts joined to form one government, but Rhode Island had a separate government started by a charter from King Charles II. The line was selected as a small adjustment to the 36 degree southern border of Virginia colony in the creation of the Province of Carolina. By 1819 it was surveyed as far west as the Mississippi River near New Madrid, Missouri, where it created the Kentucky Bend.

It is a historic civil engineering landmark, as designated by the American Society of Civil Engineers. It would later be said of the project:

The boundary Charles II envisioned was one of the most grandiose in history. To decree an imaginary geographic straight line, 3,000 miles long, as a boundary across an unknown continent that he didn't even own was the height of royal pomposity.

The survey was done in five stages, using cadastral and geodetic surveying, being one of the first attempts to mark a boundary so long that it had to be concerned with the curvature of the Earth. A major aberration in the line occurs south of Damascus, Virginia due to the surveyor, Peter Jefferson (father of Thomas Jefferson), continually edging north of the proper latitude. There are three theories about this:

1. The surveyor was drunk.
2. Iron deposits in the mountains interfered with compass readings.
3. People who lived in Tennessee exerted influence over the location of the line. (There were few British subjects living in Tennessee at the time Peter Jefferson and his partners marked their segment from the Dan River to what is now the Tennessee/North Carolina state line.)

The line was extended in 1779 and 1780 to the point at which it would first cross the Cumberland River. From there, the state of Virginia hired Thomas Walker to survey the line to the Mississippi River. Walker did not do a perfect job due to dense virgin forest, mountainous terrain, and rough riverbeds. In 1821 the state of Tennessee did a survey of the line to determine its true border with Kentucky, but this was not resolved since Kentucky was not participating. A joint survey by the two states was conducted in 1859, commanded by Austin P. Cox and Benjamin Pebbles. They started a 320-mile (510 km) survey from the New Madrid Bend of the Mississippi River to the Cumberland Gap, placing a three-foot-high (0.91 m) stone slab every five miles (8 km).

In the west, the line would later be used for approximating a de facto boundary north of which slavery could not be practiced, as established in the Missouri Compromise of 1820.

A marker at the Cumberland Gap National Historical Park denotes where the boundaries of Kentucky, Tennessee, and Virginia intersect. Under the Royal Proclamation of 1763, it also marks how far west a British American colonist was allowed to reside. Its exact location is 36°36'2.91" N, 83°40'31.23" W.
