= Battle of Island Number Ten =

1862 battle of the American Civil War

Battle of Island No. 10
- Part of the Trans-Mississippi Theater of the American Civil War
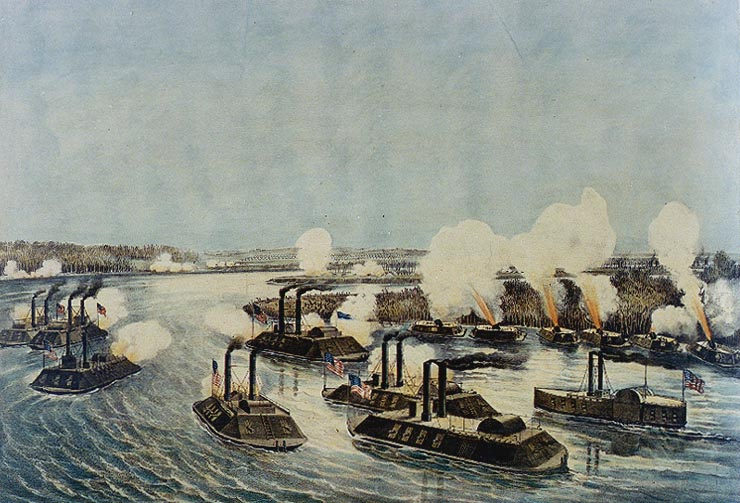
- Bombardment and Capture of Island Number Ten on the Mississippi River, April 7, 1862
Date	February 28, 1862 – April 8, 1862 (1 month, 1 week and 4 days)
Location	New Madrid, Missouri and Lake County, Tennessee 36.4588°N 89.4708°W
Result	Union victory

Belligerents
United States (Union)	Confederate States

Commanders and leaders
John Pope; Andrew H. Foote	John P. McCown; William W. Mackall

Units involved
Army of the Mississippi; Western Gunboat Flotilla	Garrison of New Madrid; Garrison of Island No. 10

Strength
23,000; 6 gunboats 11 mortar rafts	~7,000

Casualties and losses
78 total (23 killed 50 wounded 5 missing)	7,000 surrendered 30 killed & wounded

The Battle of Island Number Ten was an engagement at the New Madrid or Kentucky Bend on the Mississippi River – forming the border between Missouri and Tennessee – during the American Civil War, lasting from February 28 to April 8, 1862. Island Number Ten, a small island at the (Tennessee) base of a tight double turn in the river, was held by the Confederates from the early days of the war. It was an excellent site to impede Union efforts to invade the South by the river, as ships had to approach the island bows on and then slow to make the turns. For the defenders, however, it had an innate weakness in that it depended on a single road for supplies and reinforcements. If an enemy force managed to cut that road, the garrison would be isolated and eventually be forced to surrender.

Union forces began the siege in March 1862, shortly after the Confederate Army abandoned their position at Columbus, Kentucky. The Union Army of the Mississippi under Brigadier General John Pope made the first probes, coming overland through Missouri and occupying the town of Point Pleasant, Missouri, almost directly west of the island and south of New Madrid. Pope's army then moved north and soon brought siege guns to bear on New Madrid. The Confederate commander, Brig. Gen. John P. McCown, decided to evacuate the town after only one day of heavy bombardment, moving most of his troops to Island No. 10, abandoning his heavy artillery and most of his supplies.

Two days after the fall of New Madrid, Union gunboats and mortar rafts sailed downstream to attack Island No. 10. Over the next three weeks, the island's defenders and forces in the nearby supporting batteries were subjected to a steady bombardment by the flotilla, mostly carried out by the mortars. At the same time, the Union forces at New Madrid were digging a canal across the neck of land east of the town to bypass Island No. 10. Several transports were sent to the Army of the Mississippi when the canal was finished, which provided the army with a way to cross the river and attack the Confederate troops on the Tennessee side.

Pope persuaded Flag Officer Andrew Hull Foote to send a gunboat past the batteries, to assist him in crossing the river by keeping off any Southern gunboats and suppressing Confederate artillery fire at the point of attack. The USS Carondelet, under Commander Henry Walke, slipped past the island on the night of April 4, 1862. This was followed by the USS Pittsburg, under Lieutenant Egbert Thompson two nights later. With the support of these two gunboats, Pope was able to move his army across the river and trap the Confederates opposite the island, who by now were trying to retreat. Outnumbered at least three to one, the Confederates realized their situation was hopeless and decided to surrender. At about the same time, the garrison on the island surrendered to Flag Officer Foote and the Union flotilla.

The Union victory marked the first time the Confederate Army lost a position on the Mississippi River in battle. The river was now open to the Union Navy as far as Fort Pillow, a short distance above Memphis. Only three weeks later, New Orleans fell to a Union fleet led by David G. Farragut, and the Confederacy was in danger of being cut in two along the line of the river.

== Background ==
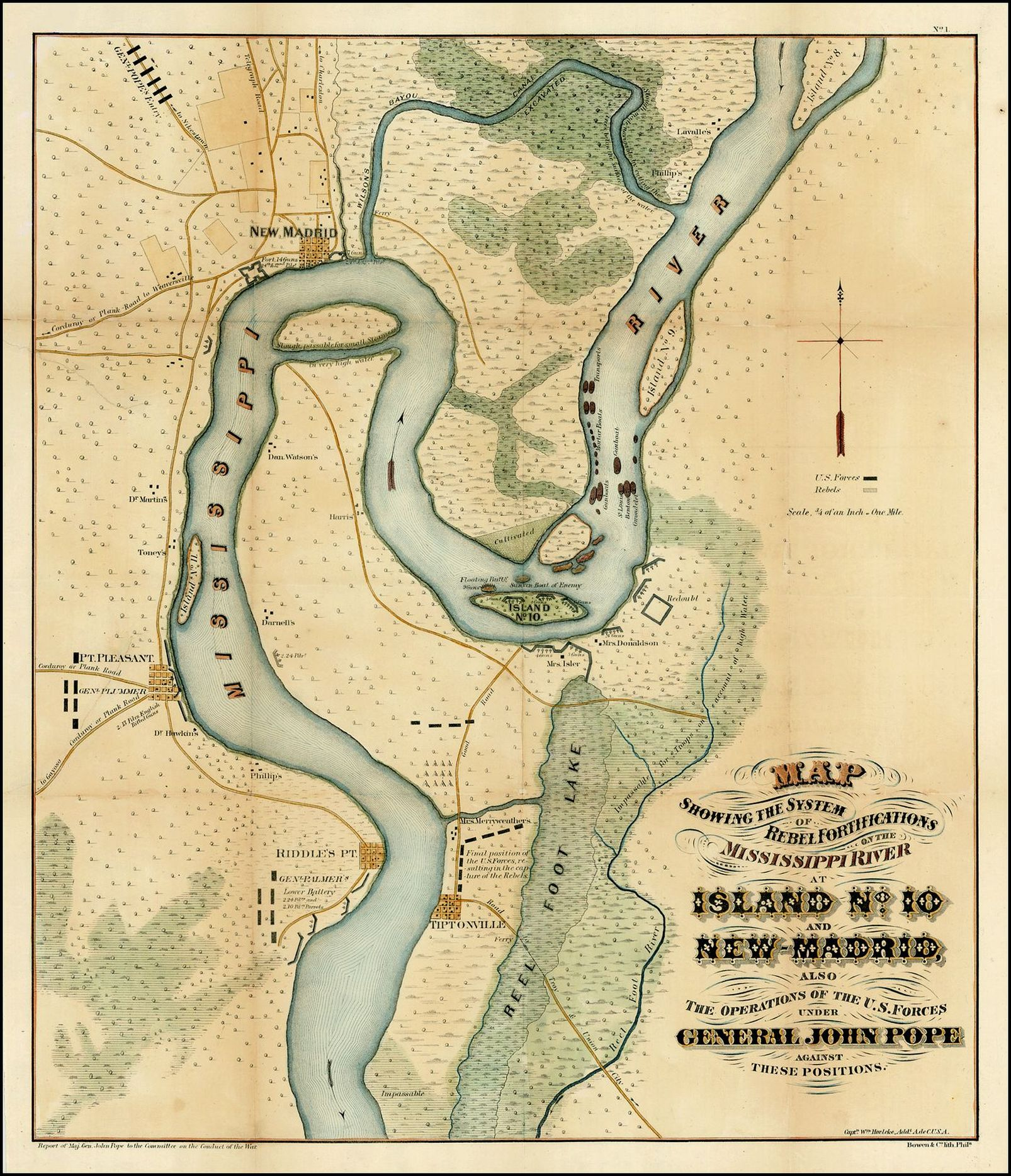
Battle map of Island No.10 Rebel Fortifications on the Mississippi River on island; New Madrid; Operations of U.S. Forces Under General Pope against Rebel positions

=== Geography ===
Island No. 10 owed its name to the fact that it was at one time the tenth island in the Mississippi River south of its junction with the Ohio. An evanescent product of the river, it was an enlarged sandbar, roughly 1 mi (1.6 km) long and 450 yd (410 m) wide at its maximum width, and standing about 10 ft (3.0 m) above low water. (Note: The island no longer exists. Not only has it been reclaimed by the Mississippi, but the river itself has changed course. Distances, including elevations, not otherwise cited in this article have been taken from maps in the application Topo!, version 4.1.1 (copyright 2005, National Geographic Society). Because of changes in the course of the river, all distances should be regarded as approximate.)

More important than the island itself was the course of the river in its neighborhood. Island No. 10 was at the southern extremity of a clockwise turn of the river through 180°, which was followed immediately by a counterclockwise turn that left the river moving almost parallel to its original course, but displaced to the west by about 8 mi (13 km). The turns are quite tight: the distance from the southern limit of the first turn to the northern limit of the second is only 9 mi (14 km) by air, or 12 mi (19 km) measured along the river channel. The double bend, which still exists in almost the same location, is known as the New Madrid Bend. (Note: Alternative names are Bessie Bend (for the town of that name, on land inside one of the loops), Kentucky Bend, or Madrid Bend.) However, the area across the Mississippi River from New Madrid, Missouri on the Kentucky and Tennessee shore was known during the Civil War simply as Madrid Bend. The town of New Madrid (pronounced MAD-rid), which gives the bend its name, is at the northern apex of the second turn.

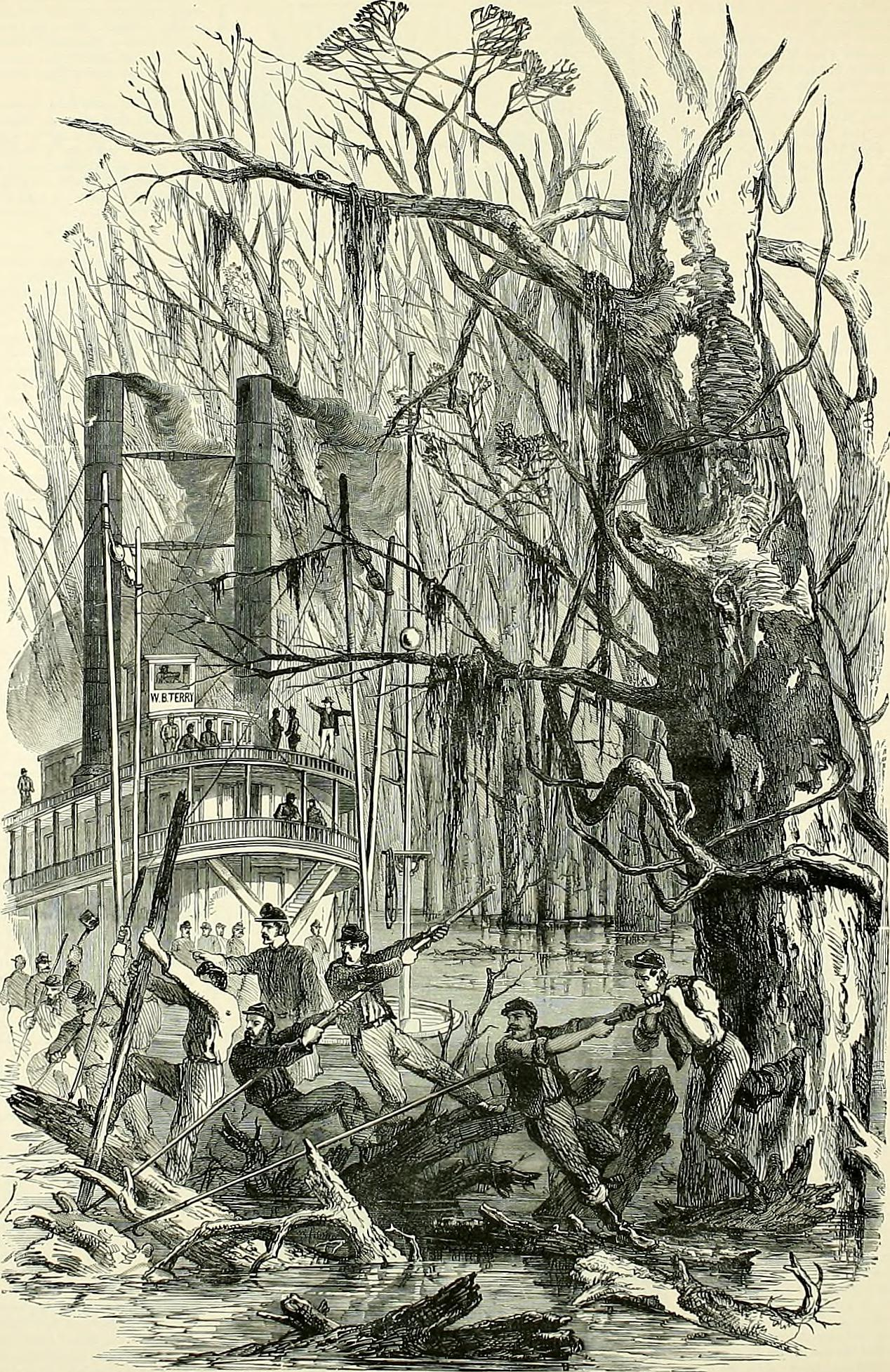
Union transport "Terry" pushing through the swamps

The mainland behind the island on the south side was connected to the town of Tiptonville, Tennessee, by a good road on the natural levee of the river. This was the only approach to the island on dry land through Tennessee, as the region is otherwise a mixture of lakes, sloughs, and swamps, with the nearest high ground nearly 10 mi (16 km) to the east. Reelfoot Lake, the largest of these, was 40 mi (64 km) long and in places 10 mi (16 km) wide. In low water, the northern end of Reelfoot Lake was near Tiptonville, but in high water such as was present in the spring of 1862, it extended north to beyond the bend. The water was nowhere very deep, so individual soldiers could cross it by wading or using makeshift rafts, but an army trying to do so would not be able to move its heavy equipment, and also would lose cohesion. For these reasons, Island No. 10 was considered to be invulnerable to land attack from the Tennessee side. It also meant, however, that the only route for either reinforcement or escape was the Tiptonville road.

The land on the Missouri side was higher, although not high enough to give guns mounted there the advantage of plunging fire. The river banks, about 30 ft (9.1 m) above low water, were only about one-third as high as the bluffs that had aided the Confederate defense against gunboats at the Battle of Fort Donelson. At high water, although shore-based guns would not be drowned as they had been at the Battle of Fort Henry, they would nevertheless be no higher than the guns of vessels on the river.

=== Confederate command ===
During the first year of the war, the Confederate forces in the West went through a series of command changes that are often confusing, and left responsibility for particular actions hard to pin down. Although New Madrid was in Missouri, it was in a pro-Southern part of the state, and therefore fell within the purview of Confederate Department No. 2. In command of the department was Maj. Gen. Leonidas Polk. The region of the bend was brought to official notice by one of Polk's subordinates, Brig. Gen. Gideon J. Pillow. Neither Pillow nor Polk was actively involved in developing the defenses at the bend; the latter assigned an army engineer, Captain Asa B. Gray, to the task, but he was not given adequate resources. On September 15, General Albert Sidney Johnston superseded Polk in command of Department No. 2, with Polk remaining in a subordinate position. Like his predecessor, Johnston took no active interest in Island No. 10. In early February, just in time for the fall of Forts Henry and Donelson, General P. G. T. Beauregard was sent to the West to command the Army of the Mississippi, and became in effect Johnston's second in command. He recognized the importance of Island No. 10, and issued the orders to abandon Columbus and move its garrison there. His health failed him at this time, so he could not take personal charge. When he recovered, he and General Johnston were preoccupied with preparations for the forthcoming Battle of Shiloh. Transferred from Columbus to Island No. 10 was Major General John P. McCown, who thereby became local commander. He remained in charge until after New Madrid was taken by the Union Army of the Mississippi; on March 31, 1862, he was replaced by Brig. Gen. William W. Mackall.

Through all of these command changes, the vessels of the Confederate States Navy along the entire length of the Mississippi were led by Flag Officer George N. Hollins. Because the river lay in two military departments, Hollins had to work with both the man in charge at the New Madrid Bend and the man in charge of the defenses of New Orleans.

=== Union command ===
At this time, command of the Union forces was also in flux, but it had little bearing on the issue. From the time the campaign against New Madrid began, in late February 1862, the Army of the Mississippi was led by Maj. Gen. John Pope. The army was a part of, first, the Department of the Missouri, and after March 11, the Department of the Mississippi, both under Maj. Gen. Henry W. Halleck. The name change represented organizational changes in the army that did not affect the campaign.

The warships employed in the campaign were part of the Western Gunboat Flotilla, led by Flag Officer Andrew Hull Foote. Foote was a captain in the US Navy, but the flotilla was organized as part of the U.S. Army, so he reported to, and was subordinate to, Halleck.

=== Early defense preparations ===
The widespread publicity given to Union General in Chief Winfield Scott's Anaconda Plan made the Confederate government aware of the threat that would be posed to the Mississippi Valley by a water-borne invasion along the course of the river. In response, they set up a series of defensive positions along the river. Among them were Fort Pillow, 40 mi (64 km) north of Memphis, and extensive works at Columbus, Kentucky, both of which positions were important in relation to Island No. 10. (Note: The Confederate occupation of Columbus required a breach of Kentucky's professed neutrality, and is regarded as one of the major blunders of the war.)

Construction of the batteries on and near the island began in mid-August 1861, directed by Captain Asa B. Gray. He began by laying out a battery on the Tennessee shore about 1.5 mi (2.4 km) above the island. This battery, known as Battery No. 1 or the Redan Battery, commanded the approach to the bend. Vessels coming down the river would have to move directly toward its guns for more than a mile. It was not very effective, as it was sited on low ground subject to flooding. Almost as soon as work was started, however, the attention of Maj. Gen. Leonidas Polk was diverted to the capture and fortification of Columbus. Work continued at Island No. 10, but it was not regarded as urgent and so was denied both equipment and workers.

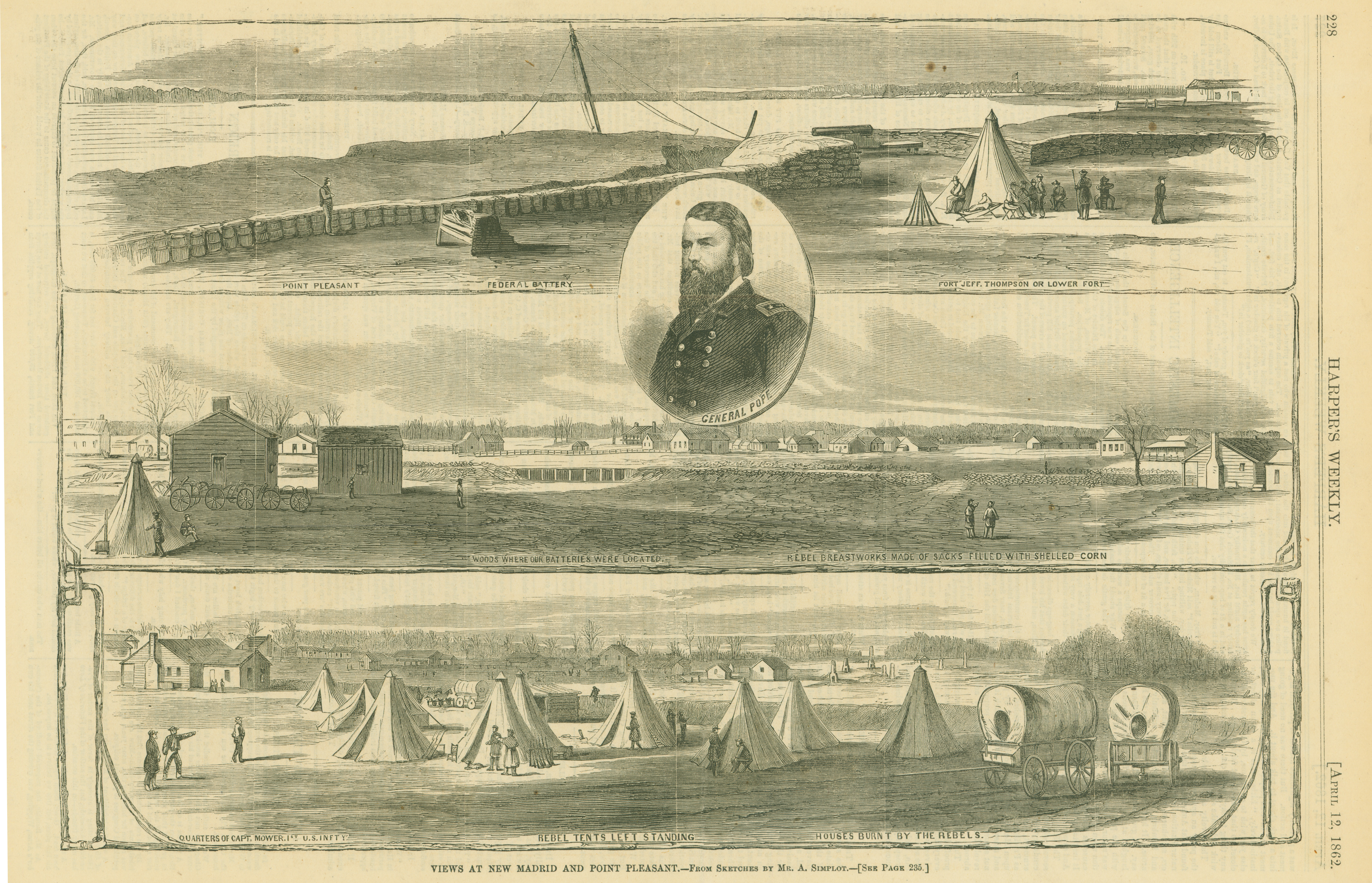
Views at New Madrid and Point Pleasant, showing union camps, fortifications and batteries.

The importance of the New Madrid Bend rose dramatically when Fort Henry and then Fort Donelson fell to Union forces in early February 1862. Columbus was cut off from rest of the Confederate Army, and faced capture by Union troops advancing overland from the Tennessee River to the Mississippi. To avoid losing the garrison and its equipment, General Beauregard ordered that the position be abandoned as quietly as possible. The process began on February 24, when the first members of the Columbus garrison arrived at Island No. 10. Two days later, its new commander, Brig. Gen. John P. McCown, arrived, and immediately set to work to strengthen the position from Battery No. 1 to Point Pleasant.

McCown, with adequate resources, was able to transform the island and nearby mainland into a formidable obstacle for any fleet attempting to pass. By the middle of March, five batteries containing 24 guns had been built on the shore above the island; 19 guns were in five batteries on the island itself; and the floating battery New Orleans, with nine guns, was moored at the west end of the island. In addition, two forts had been set up at New Madrid: Fort Thompson to the west, with 14 guns, and Fort Bankhead with 7 guns to the east, where St. John's Bayou met the Mississippi.

The Confederate Navy also supported the position. Flag Officer George N. Hollins commanded six gunboats in the river between Fort Pillow and Island No. 10. All of these were unarmored; the armored ram CSS Manassas would have been there also, but she was found to be unable to operate in the relatively shallow water. She was damaged by running aground on the way north, so she was sent back to New Orleans.

=== Union preliminaries ===
Preparations by the Union for the attack on New Madrid and vicinity began before the evacuation of Columbus. On February 23, 1862, Maj. Gen. Pope was placed in command of the (Union) Army of the Mississippi, assembling at Commerce, Missouri. It was common practice at that time to go into winter quarters and await the arrival of good weather in the spring, but Pope soon had his army, which at this early stage of the campaign numbered 10,000 men, on the march, corduroying roads when necessary. The army arrived at New Madrid on March 3, but were not yet prepared to attack the Confederate positions. Preparing for a siege, Pope requested that his army be supplied with some heavy artillery, which arrived on March 12.

The gunboats under Flag Officer Andrew H. Foote were not ready to cooperate with the Army of the Mississippi at this early date, as the damages they had received at Fort Donelson were still being repaired. They were finally sent down from Cairo on March 14, with Foote yet believing that they were not ready for combat. The Union fleet was augmented by the addition of 14 mortar rafts, vessels that each mounted a single 13 in (330 mm) mortar. The mortars were a semi-autonomous unit under the command of (Army) Captain Henry E. Maynadier.

== Battle ==
=== First contact ===
Unwilling to waste his troops in an assault on the forts at New Madrid, Pope sent a brigade under Colonel (later Brigadier General) Joseph B. Plummer to occupy the town of Point Pleasant, Missouri, on the right bank of the river almost directly opposite Island No. 10. The movement was contested by the Confederate gunboats, but Plummer's troops soon learned that they had only to withdraw out of range when the gunboats appeared, and return as soon as they left. The brigade occupied Point Pleasant on March 6, and the boats shelled their positions for the next three days. In this period, the Confederate Army remained within their fortifications, offering no support to Flag Officer Hollins.

The siege guns arrived on March 12, surprising McCown and Hollins almost as much as the winter march of Pope's army. They effectively closed the river to the unarmored gunboats, and prevented reinforcement of the artillery companies at New Madrid by shifting troops from Island No. 10.

The big guns opened fire on the New Madrid defensive positions on March 13, and continued throughout the day. McCown realized that Pope would try to attack his forts by regular approaches. He felt that his reduced artillery companies would be too exhausted to resist, so he decided not to wait for the inevitable. On the night of March 13–14, orders were given to abandon the town and its two forts. A heavy rainstorm hid the troop movements from the enemy, so the evacuation was accomplished without incident. There was some confusion (which seems to have been exaggerated in Pope's reports), and the departure was so sudden that the guns in the forts had to be spiked and left behind, but most of the troops were successfully removed and redistributed. On the morning of March 14, two deserters appeared bearing a white flag, and informed Pope that the town was deserted.

Following the loss of New Madrid, some of the units at the bend were withdrawn to Fort Pillow, not quite 70 mi (110 km) as the crow flies to the south, but almost twice that by the river. McCown was replaced in command at the island by Brig. Gen. William W. Mackall. (Note: The name is pronounced MAY-call.) Although this looks like a reprimand for his poor defense of New Madrid, McCown actually was promoted to major general.

=== The siege ===
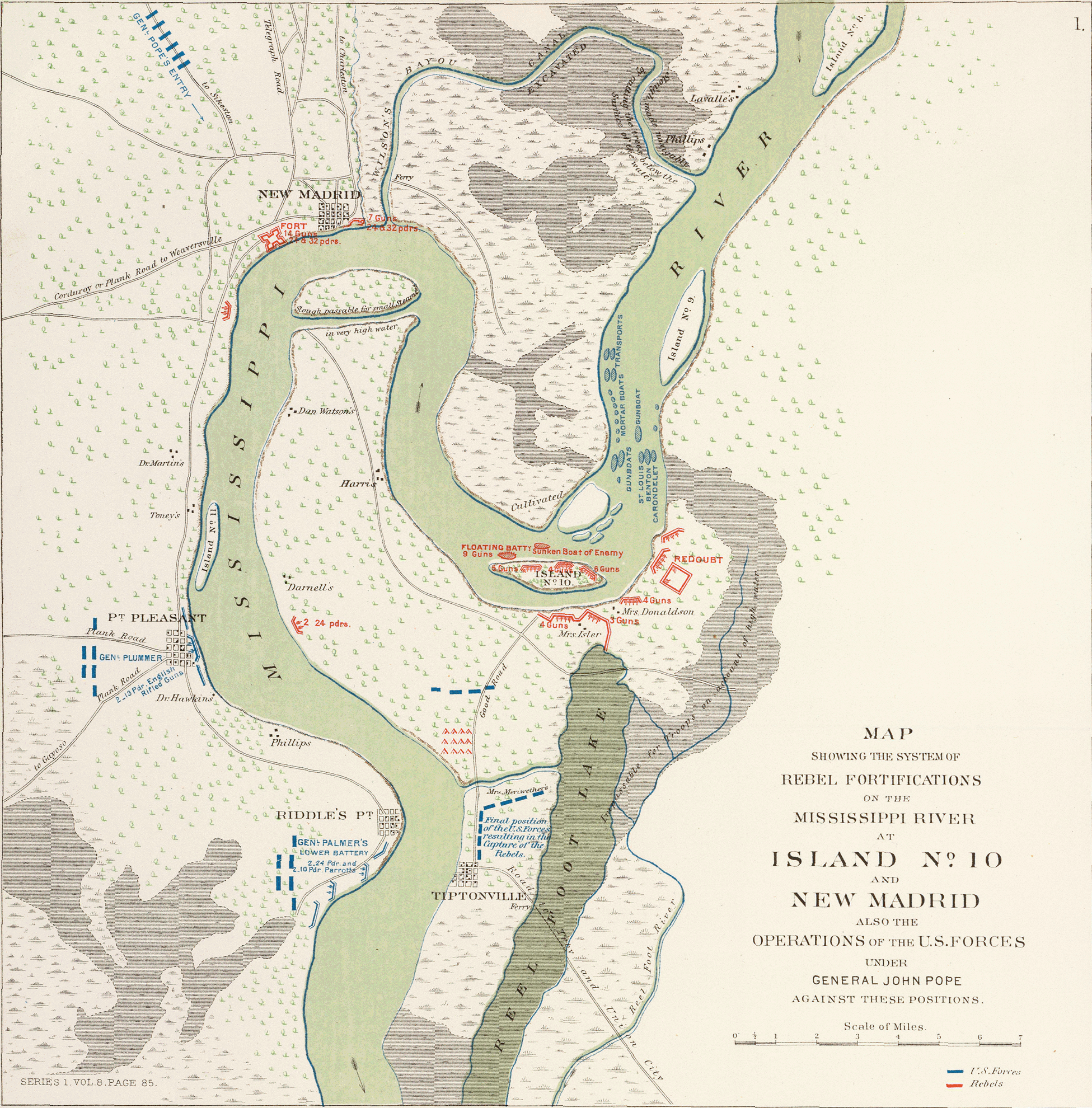
Siege of Island Number 10

The gunboats and mortars arrived on March 15, and the siege is dated from that time. Pope, in New Madrid, and Foote, upstream of the bend, were kept apart by Island No. 10. From the first, they did not agree how to go about conducting the operation. Pope wanted immediate action; Foote hoped to subdue the island by the slow process of bombardment. Foote was hampered by ambiguous or even contradictory orders from Halleck, who was distracted at the time by preparations for the advance along the Tennessee River that soon culminated in the Battle of Shiloh (or Pittsburg Landing). As early as March 17, Pope was asking that two or three gunboats run past the Confederate batteries, to enable him to cross the river and trap the entire garrison. (Note: At this time, Pope's army did not have the transports that would be needed to cross.) Foote demurred, arguing that his boats were not invincible, that a chance disabling shot would deliver a boat into Confederate hands, and that gunboat could then threaten all the Northern cities along the Mississippi and its tributaries. Foote's thinking may also have been affected by the wound he had received at Fort Donelson, which was not healing properly and kept him in pain and on crutches.

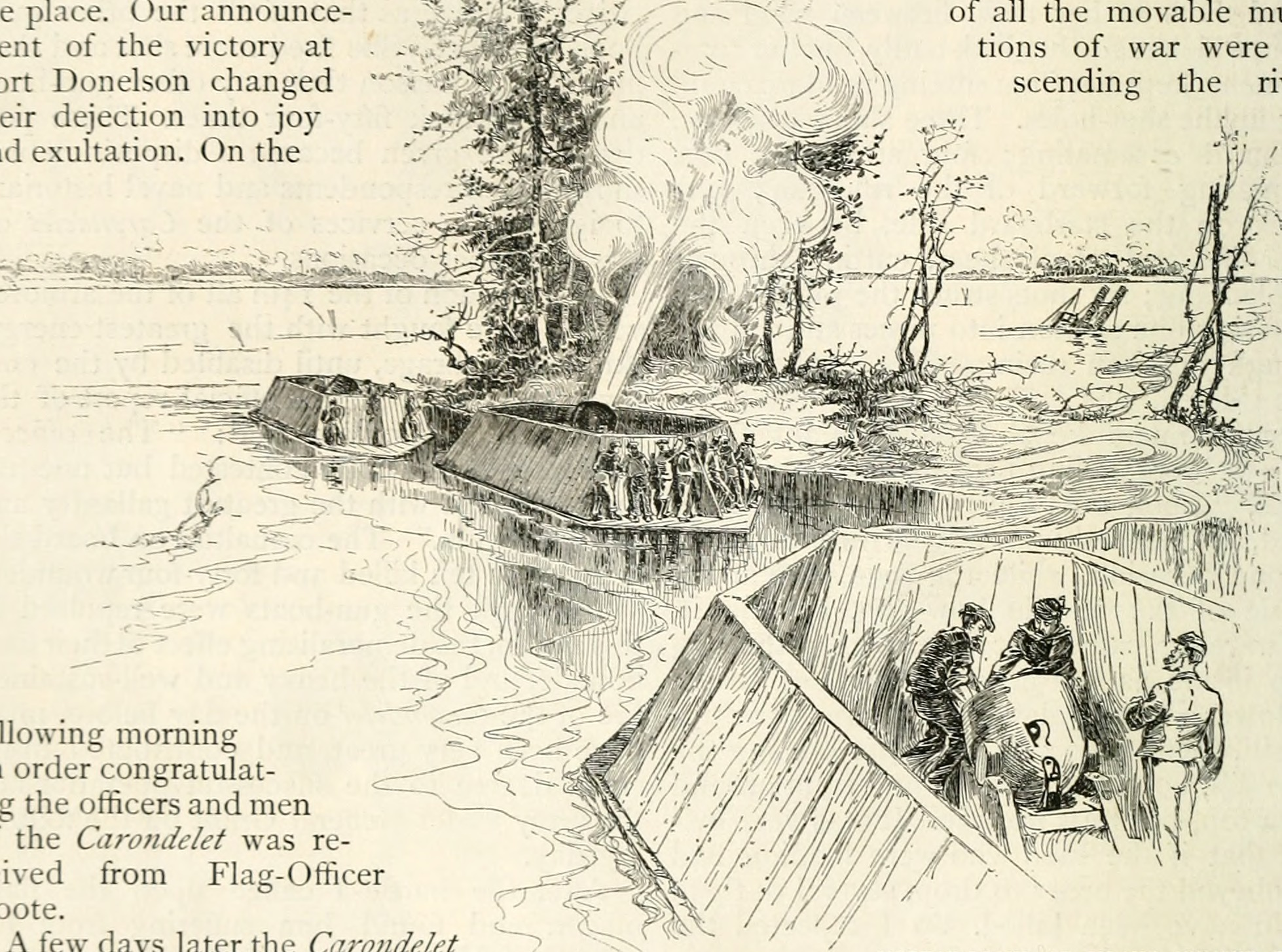
The mortar rafts bombard the island

For the next two weeks, fighting consisted of bombardment of the island at rather long range, mostly conducted by the mortars, and occasionally replied to by the Confederate batteries. High expectations that had been held for the mortars were dashed; they did very little harm to the enemy position. The most significant damage incurred in this period was in fact self-inflicted: during a bombardment on March 17 in which the gunboats took part, a gun on USS St. Louis exploded, killing three members of the crew and wounding a dozen others.

After Foote had flatly rejected Pope's request that gunboats run past Island No. 10, someone on Pope's staff suggested that perhaps a canal could be cut to enable Union vessels to bypass the batteries. (Note: Controversy concerning authorship of the plan for the canal arose later. Brig. Gen. Schuyler Hamilton asserted that he was the first person to suggest it, but Colonel Josiah W. Bissell had already sketched out a plan before Hamilton brought it up in a meeting with Pope. Bissell, J. W., "Sawing out the channel above Island Number Ten," Battles and leaders, v. 1, pp. 460–462. Hamilton, Schuyler, comment by, Battles and leaders, p. 462. No one disputes that Bissell directed the actual work on the canal.) The canal was completed in two weeks, but it was not deep enough to provide passage for the gunboats. It proved useful, nevertheless, in that transports and supply vessels could use it, so that Pope did not have to depend on land communications.

=== Gunboats pass the batteries, complete the siege ===
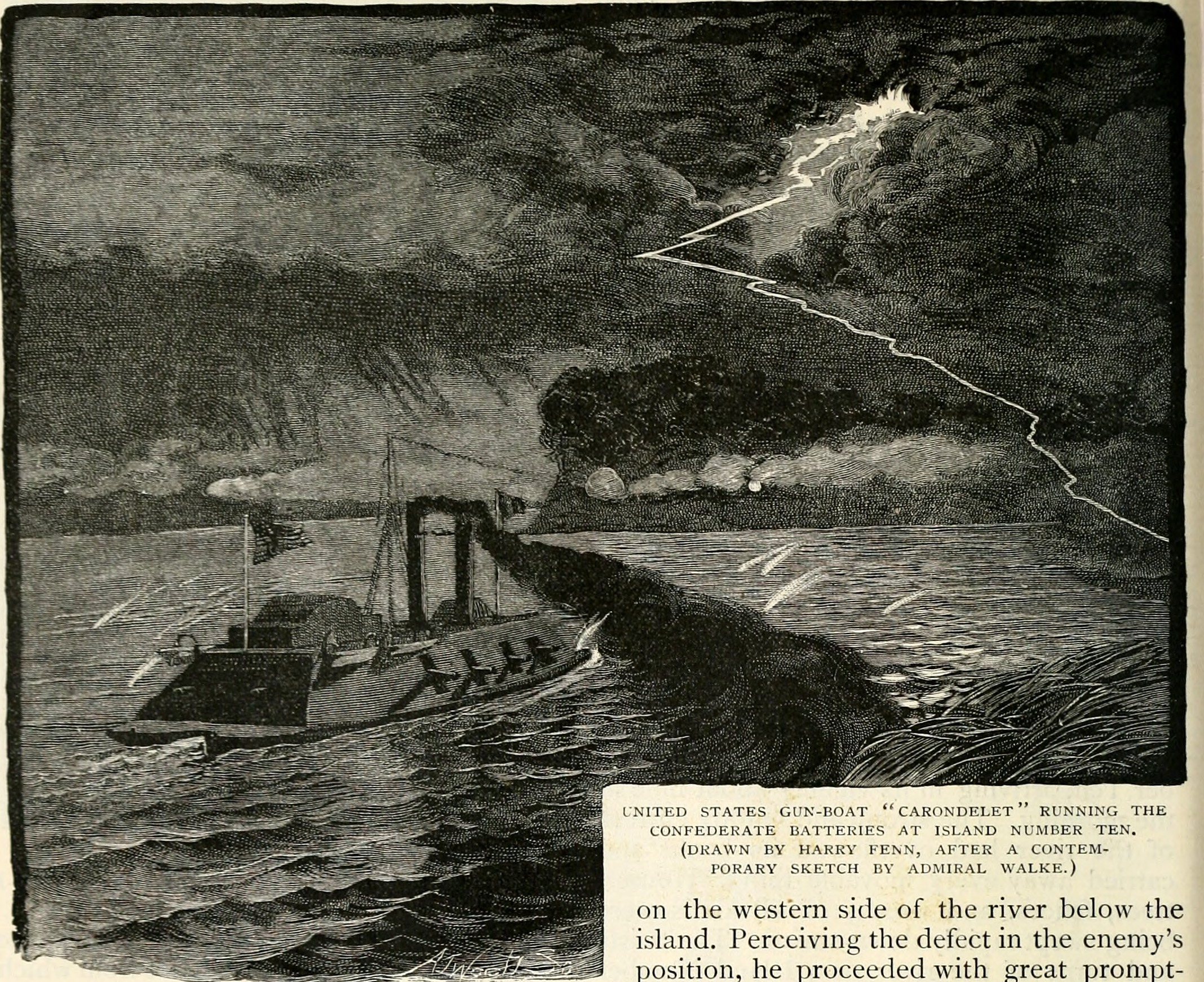
Carondelet runs the batteries

Pope still insisted that he needed a gunboat to cover his projected landing on the Tennessee side of the river. Foote called two councils of war among his captains; in the first, on March 20, his decision not to risk running past the batteries was confirmed. When Halleck wrote to Foote, saying, "Give him (Pope) all the assistance in your power," Foote called a second council, on March 29. This time, Commander Henry Walke, captain of USS Carondelet, thought that the risk was worth the candle, and volunteered to take his boat through. Foote gave the necessary orders, and Carondelet was prepared for the run. She was covered with rope, chain, and whatever loose material lay at hand. A coal barge filled with coal and hay was lashed to her side. Her steam exhaust was diverted from the smokestacks (called "chimneys" on river craft) to muffle the sound. She then had only to wait for a sufficiently dark night to make her run.

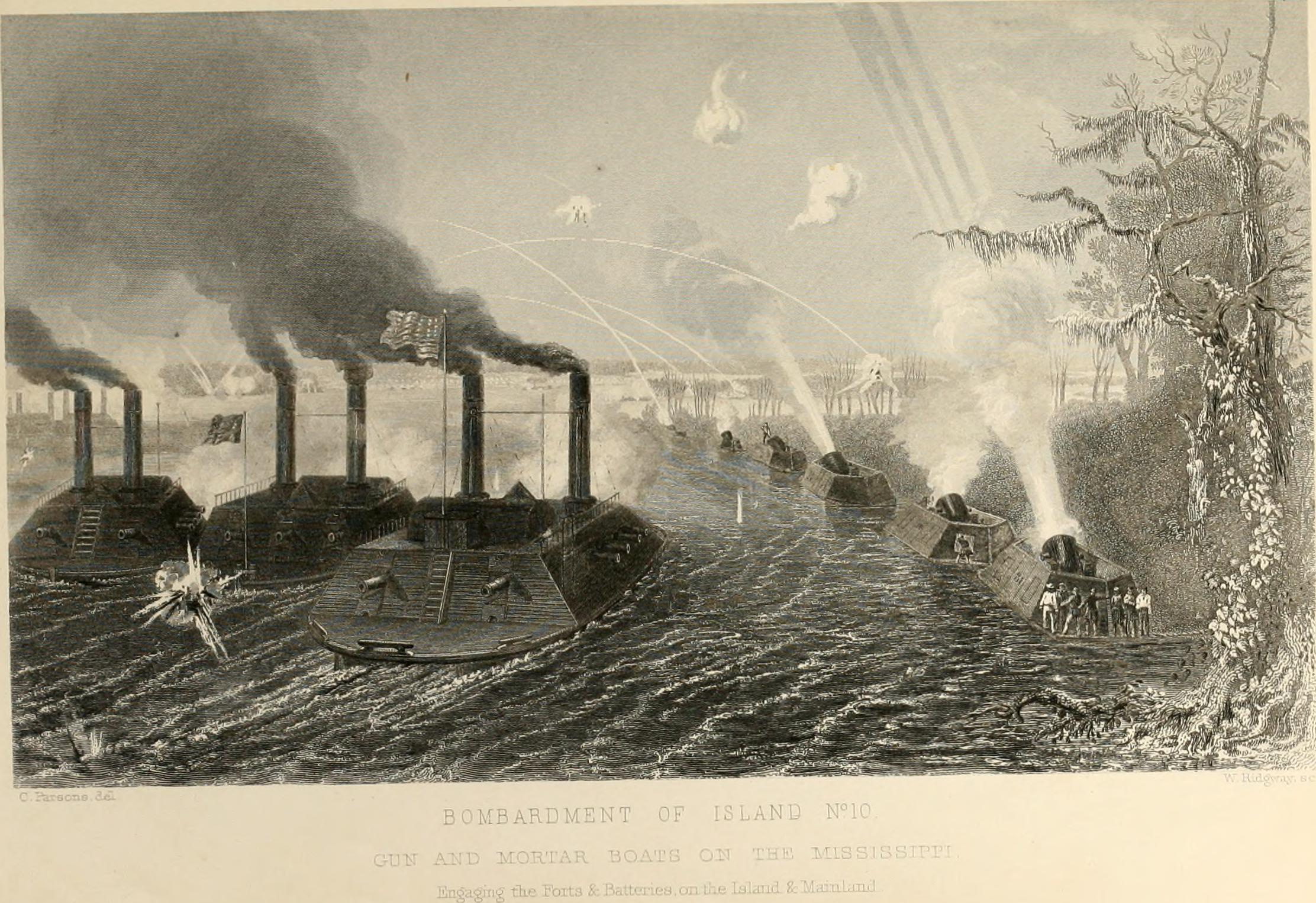
Bombardment of Island No. 10

To reduce the danger as much as possible, a raid by sailors in the flotilla and soldiers from the 42nd Illinois Infantry, under Colonel George W. Roberts overran Battery No. 1 and spiked its guns on the night of April 1. On April 2, the flotilla, including both mortars and gunboats, concentrated its fire on the floating battery New Orleans. She was hit several times, and her mooring lines were parted. She drifted downstream, out of the war. On April 4, conditions for running past the remaining batteries were satisfactory. The night was moonless, and after dark a thunderstorm came up. Carondelet made her way downstream, and was not discovered until she was abreast of the Confederate Battery No. 2. She might have escaped detection completely had not her smokestacks blazed up; the buildup of soot, no longer dampened by escaping steam, caught fire and revealed her position. The batteries opened, but their fire was inaccurate, and Carondelet completed the run unscathed. Pope continued to press Foote for another gunboat, and two nights later USS Pittsburg made a similar run.

Pope now was able to cross the river with his army without prospect of interference from Confederate gunboats. He could also suppress enemy fire that may have opposed their landing. On April 7, he made his move, and sent the gunboats to destroy the batteries at Watson's Landing, the place he had selected for the attack. When this was accomplished, the transports carried the troops across, and the landings proceeded without opposition.

A few hours elapsed until Mackall was able to decide what to do next. Realizing that his position was hopeless, he put the men on the mainland in motion in the direction of Tiptonville. The motion was detected by Pope's spies, who gave the information to Pope. Pope then diverted his soldiers to Tiptonville, and the operation became a footrace rather than the expected battle. Mackall's only hope was that the gunboats would not interfere, but they did, and the retreat of his army was delayed long enough for Pope's men to get to Tiptonville first. The defenders were trapped, with no prospect of victory, so Mackall decided to surrender.

While this was taking place, the demoralized garrison of Island No. 10 surrendered separately to Flag Officer Foote and his gunboats. The river was then open as far as Fort Pillow.

== Conclusion ==
The destruction of the Confederate garrison was complete. Only a few hundred individual soldiers managed to escape by wading or rafting across Reelfoot Lake and later rejoining the army. The number who were captured became a matter of controversy. Pope asserted, in his official reports, that he had taken 273 officers and 6,700 private soldiers captive. This is almost certainly a great exaggeration. Confederate records (admittedly incomplete) indicate that not more than 5,350 men were present. The number captured would then likely have been less than 4,500.

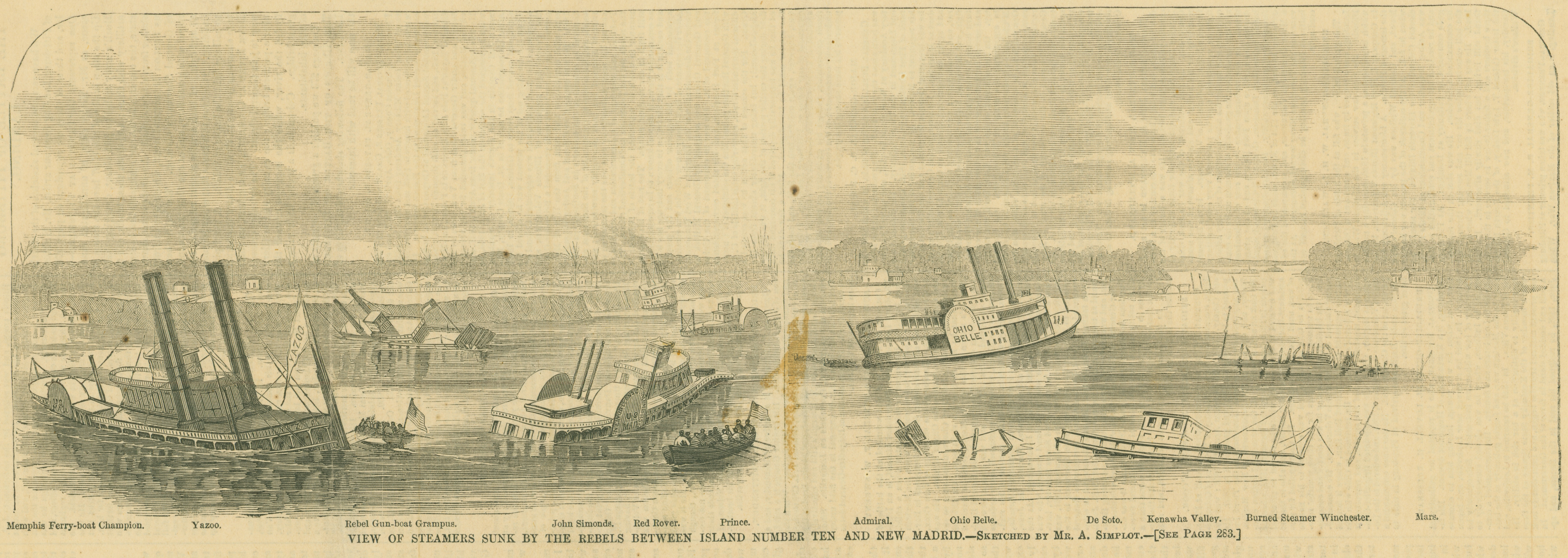
View of Steamers Sunk by the Rebels Between Island Number Ten and New Madrid after the capture of Island No. 10

Aside from the prisoners taken, the number of casualties in the entire campaign was very low. From the fall of New Madrid to the surrender at Tiptonville, the Union army and navy had lost only 7 men killed from all causes, 4 missing, and 14 wounded. During the entire campaign, losses in the Army of the Mississippi were reported as 8 killed, 21 wounded, and 3 missing. Confederate losses in killed and wounded were not reported, but seem to have been similarly low. Although Beauregard sought early release for the men captured at Island No. 10, the offer was declined and several soldiers' wives who had been employed at the island choose to go north into captivity alongside their husbands. About 1,400 of the captured Confederate soldiers (many from the 1st Regiment Alabama Infantry) were transported by railroad to what was previously a Union Army training field in Madison, Wisconsin. This marked the beginning of Camp Randall's use as a prisoner-of-war camp. From the end of April to the end of May, 140 of the prisoners died at Camp Randall, due to its unsanitary conditions, (Note: Per this article: "...the camp hospital appeared unable to handle the sick Confederate patients. Due to the results of the inspection, the prisoners were transferred to Camp Douglas, Chicago, on the last day of May.") and are buried at Confederate Rest.

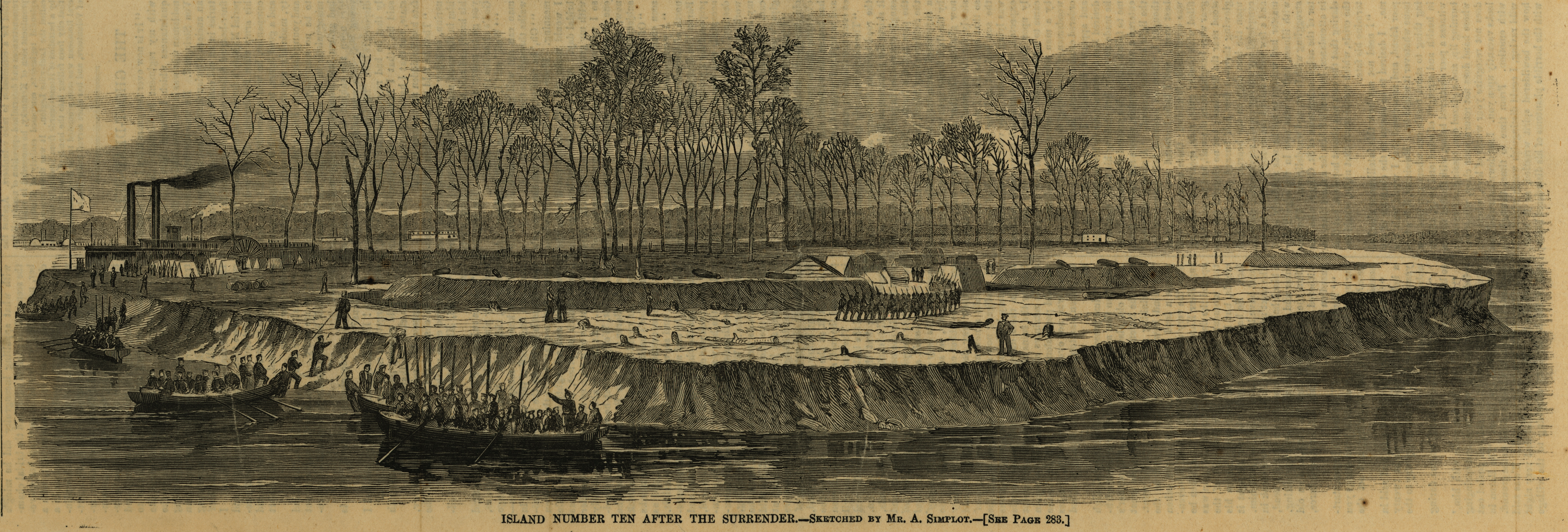
Island Number Ten After the Surrender

Because April 7 was the second day of the far bloodier Battle of Shiloh, the campaign for Island No. 10 soon fell from public notice. It has become memorable principally for the run of USS Carondelet past the batteries, whose passage marked the introduction of a new tactic in warfare. The use of steam for driving ships meant that they were no longer forced to neutralize fixed defenses or batteries. The tactic later became commonplace in the Civil War, being employed by Farragut at New Orleans, Port Hudson, Vicksburg, and Mobile, and by David D. Porter at Vicksburg. (Note: Although Farragut's passage of Forts Jackson and St. Philip took place after Walke had taken Carondelet past Island No. 10, Farragut's decision to run the forts was made independently. It is likely that he had not even heard of the events at the New Madrid Bend when he made his move.) Consequently, the value of fixed fortifications was much (but not completely) diminished. The restored nation had to consider this when designing its defense system after 1865. In addition, the impact of season and weather should also be recognized for aiding Union efforts; if the federals had arrived later in the summer after the spring freshet of high water, then their naval options would have been much more limited, no back channel could have been carved out, and Confederate chances for defense or withdrawal likely much improved.

== See also ==
- Battle of Fort Henry
- Battle of Fort Donelson
- Troop engagements of the American Civil War, 1862
- List of costliest American Civil War land battles
- Commemoration of the American Civil War on postage stamps
