= Joseph B. Plummer =

United States Army general (1816–1862)

Joseph Bennett Plummer
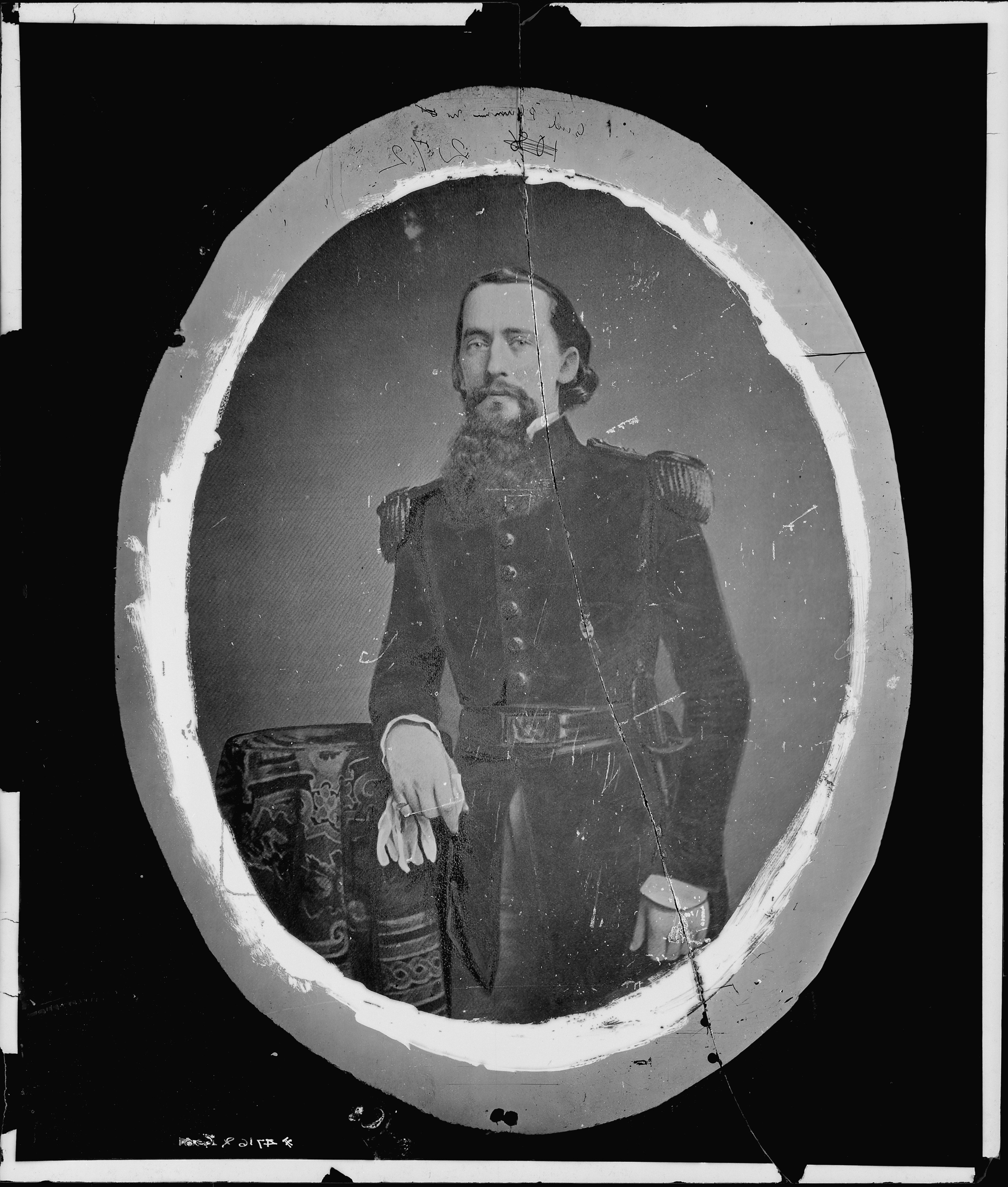
- Born: November 15, 1816; Barre, Massachusetts
- Died: August 9, 1862 (aged 45); Corinth, Mississippi
- Burial place: Arlington National Cemetery
- Spouse: Frances Hagner Clark (died 1900)
- Children: Satterlee Clark Plummer^{(b. 1844; died 1881)}; Lydia Lee Plummer^{(b. 1846)}
- Relatives: Satterlee Clark (brother-in-law); Temple Clark (brother-in-law)
- Military career
- Allegiance: United States
- Branch: United States Army; Union Army
- Service years: 1841–1862
- Rank: Brig. General, USV; Major, USA
- Conflicts: Mexican–American War; American Civil War; Battle of Wilson's Creek (WIA); Engagement at Fredericktown; Battle of Island Number Ten; Siege of Corinth

Joseph Bennett Plummer (November 15, 1816 (Note: Some controversy exists regarding Plummer's year of birth. See the notes and gravestone photos in the External links section. Warner, 1964, p. 374 gives this date but says that he seems to have taken a few years off his age so as not to endanger an appointment to the military academy which he sought for at least two years.) – August 9, 1862) was a career United States Army officer, and rose to the rank of brigadier general of volunteers during the American Civil War.

== Biography ==
Plummer was born in Barre, Massachusetts, and educated in the common schools. He taught school for several years. In 1837, he received an appointment to the United States Military Academy and graduated in 1841. He received a brevet rank of second lieutenant in the 1st U.S. Infantry and served on garrison duty. He missed the first year of the Mexican–American War due to sickness. Plummer did quartermaster duty on the Texas frontier from 1848 until 1861. In 1852, he was promoted to a captain in the 1st U.S. Infantry.

He was wounded at the Battle of Wilson's Creek while commanding a battalion of Regulars. Plummer was commissioned as the colonel of the 11th Missouri Volunteers in September 1861 and assigned command of the post at Cape Girardeau, Missouri, a position he filled until March 1862. Then, he was appointed as a brigadier general, U.S. Volunteers on March 11, 1862. In April 1862, Plummer was promoted to major of the 8th U.S. Infantry in the Regular Army.

Later, Plummer commanded the 5th Division of Pope's army at New Madrid and the Island Number Ten campaign. He subsequently commanded a brigade of Stanley's division at Corinth and died in camp at Corinth on August 9, 1862 (exactly one year after Wilson's Creek) from lingering effects of his wounds and prolonged exposure in the field.

Plummer was buried in Arlington National Cemetery.

== Personal life and family ==
Around 1841, Plummer married Frances Hagner Clark, the fourth child of Major Satterlee Clark and his wife Frances Whitcroft. Major Clark had served in the War of 1812 and subsequently worked as an Army paymaster in Washington, D.C., and Utica, New York. By 1841, the Clark family was living in the Wisconsin Territory, where Major Clark was sutler to Fort Howard in Green Bay, and Satterlee Clark, Jr., was sutler at Fort Winnebago.

Plummer was also friendly with his wife's brother, Temple Clark, who also served in the Mexican–American War and was a Union Army officer in the Civil War. He invited Temple Clark to join his staff in the Army of the Mississippi in the months before his death.

Plummer and his wife had two children, Satterlee Clark Plummer and Lydia Lee Plummer. Satterlee Clark Plummer graduated from the United States Military Academy in 1865 and was a career U.S. Army officer like his father. He died of pneumonia in 1881 at the home of his mother, in Washington, D.C., and was posthumously promoted to captain. Lieutenant Plummer also wrote correspondence for newspapers under the pen name "Sleeping Friar".

== See also ==
- List of American Civil War generals (Union)
- List of Massachusetts generals in the American Civil War
- Massachusetts in the American Civil War

== Sources ==
- Knapp, George E., Wilson's Creek Staff Ride & Battlefield Tour
- Warner, Ezra J. Generals in Blue: Lives of the Union Commanders. Baton Rouge: Louisiana State University Press, 1964. ISBN 978-0-8071-0822-2.
