= George Schott =

American politician

George Schott (1836–1883) was a member of the Wisconsin State Assembly.

== Biography ==
Schott was born on June 13, 1836, in the Kingdom of Württemberg. His parents and their 11 children moved to Canada in 1847 and subsequently to Herman, Dodge County, Wisconsin, in 1849. In 1861 Schott married Caroline Bates, with whom he raised six children.

== Career ==
In 1862 Schott became Town Treasurer of Herman and afterward Chairman. He was elected to the Assembly in 1872 and in 1876. From 1873 to 1874, he was a member of the Dodge County, Wisconsin Board. He was a Democrat. Schott died on September 28, 1883, in Hartford, Wisconsin, and was buried in Herman.
