= Charles Waldo =

19th century American politician

Member of the Wisconsin State Assembly from the Marquette–Waushara district
- In office January 6, 1851 – January 5, 1852
- Preceded by: Benjamin Spaulding
- Succeeded by: Eleazer Root

Personal details
- Born: December 16, 1819 Tioga County, New York, U.S.
- Died: November 2, 1909 (aged 89) Hood River, Oregon, U.S.
- Resting place: Cremated
- Party: Whig
- Spouse: Antonette Phelps (m. 1848–1909)
- Children: Charles Frederick Waldo^{(b. 1846; died 1924)}; Jenny Lisle Waldo^{(b. 1851; died 1872)}; Estella Emma (Clausen)^{(b. 1858; died 1925)}
- Relatives: Samuel Lovett Waldo (grand uncle); George E. Waldo (second cousin)

Charles Waldo (December 16, 1819 – November 2, 1909) was an American millwright, woodworker, politician, and pioneer of Wisconsin and California. He served one term in the Wisconsin State Assembly, representing Marquette and Waushara counties during the 1851 term.

== Biography ==
Charles Waldo was born in Tioga County, New York, in December 1819. He was raised and educated in that vicinity, learning the millwright trade from his elder brother, Orson. He then continued to develop his woodworking skills and worked as a patternmaker. In the mid-1840s, he moved west to the Wisconsin Territory, where he went to work for another brother, Albert Gallatin Waldo.

By early 1850, he was residing in Marquette County, Wisconsin, and that year he was elected to the Wisconsin State Assembly, running on the Whig Party ticket. He served in the 4th Wisconsin Legislature.

After his term in the Legislature, he resided at Waupun, Wisconsin, before moving west to California. In his later years, he resided at the home of his son, Charles F. Waldo, in Hood River, Oregon. He died there shortly after his 91st birthday in 1909.

== Personal life and family ==
Charles Waldo was the 10th of 11 children born to John Waldo and his second wife, Betsey (née Clark). The Waldos were descendants of Cornelius Waldo, who emigrated from England to the Massachusetts Bay Colony in the mid-1600s.

Charles Waldo married Antonette Phelps on January 20, 1848, in Oak Grove, Dodge County, Wisconsin. They had three children together, but one daughter died young.

Wisconsin State Assembly
Preceded by Benjamin Spaulding	Member of the Wisconsin State Assembly from the Marquette–Waushara district January 6, 1851 – January 5, 1852	Succeeded by Eleazer Root
