= Kentucky Bend =

Peninsula in Fulton County, Kentucky

- Peninsula
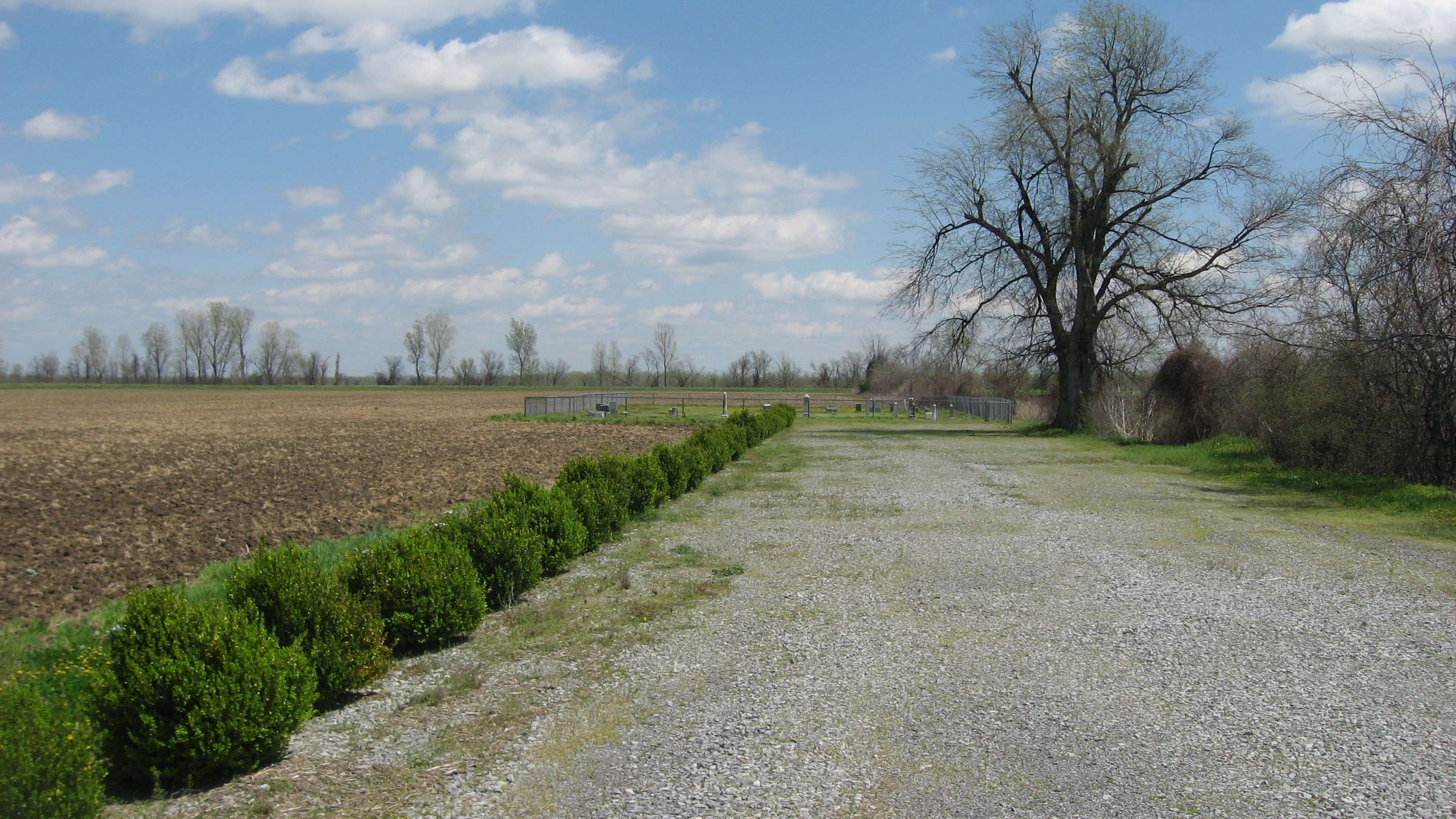
- Nicknames: New Madrid Bend, Madrid Bend, Bessie Bend, Bubbleland
- Interactive map of Kentucky Bend
- Coordinates: 36.53°N 89.51°W
- Country: United States
- State: Kentucky
- County: Fulton

Population (2020)
  - Total: 9
- ZIP code: 38079

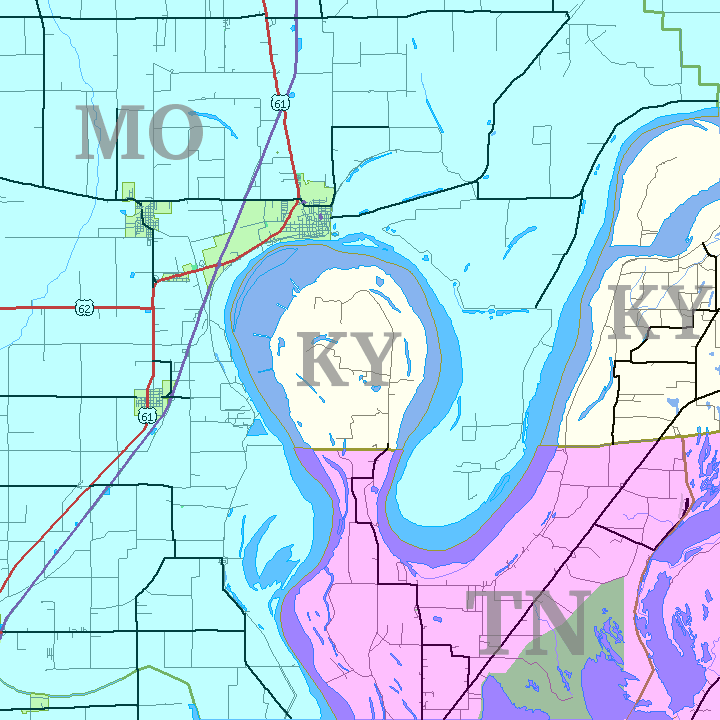
Kentucky Bend and surrounding area Missouri (MO) Tennessee (TN) Kentucky (KY)

The Kentucky Bend, variously called the New Madrid Bend, Madrid Bend, Bessie Bend, or Bubbleland, is an exclave of Fulton County, Kentucky that is encircled by the states of Tennessee and Missouri. The exclave is a portion of a peninsula defined by an oxbow loop meander of the Mississippi River, and its inclusion in the state of Kentucky stems from uncertainties of the course of the Mississippi River when the boundary between Tennessee and Kentucky was established.

As of the 2020 census, the population of the Kentucky Bend Census County Division was nine people. The mailing address of the area is Tiptonville, Tennessee. New Madrid, Missouri is directly across the river to the north, but it lacks connection to the bend by road or ferry. The closest crossings of the Mississippi River are the Dorena–Hickman Ferry and the Caruthersville Bridge located in nearby Dyer County.

== Geography ==
Kentucky Bend is the extreme southwestern corner of Kentucky. The peninsula is traversed by the southern line of latitude of the state of Kentucky, at the banks of the Mississippi River. The only highway into the area is Tennessee State Route 22, whose continuation into Kentucky Bend at one time was signed as Kentucky State Route 313.

According to the U.S. Census Bureau, the Kentucky Bend covers a land area of 26.9 square miles (69.6 km^{2}), of which 17.5 square miles (45.2 km^{2}) are land and 9.4 square miles (24.4 km^{2}), or 35.08%, are covered by water. The water area is primarily within the Mississippi River. Surveyors marking the boundary between Kentucky and Tennessee had only estimated where their line would meet the Mississippi; later, more detailed surveys revealed the location of this line to pass through north–south bends in the river, creating a division of the peninsula. The western border of Kentucky is designated as the Mississippi River, as is the eastern border of Missouri—thus the creation of a "notch" for Kentucky, but not for Tennessee.

== History ==
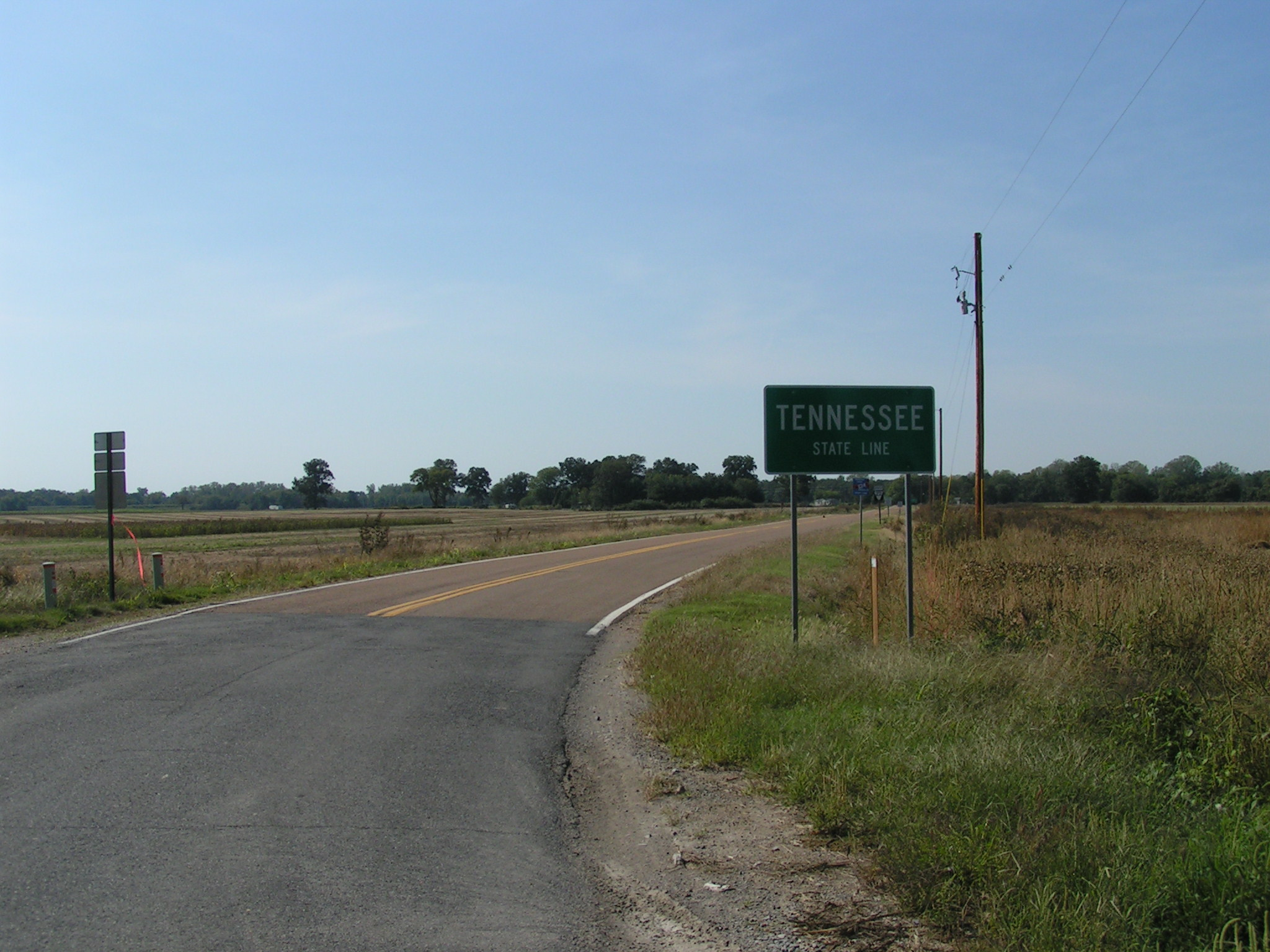
State line between the Kentucky Bend and Route 22 in Tennessee.

Front stone for the Madrid Bend families' cemetery (known in official registries as Whitson Cemetery)

The border predates the separation of Kentucky from Virginia and Tennessee from North Carolina. Its location stems from the Royal Colonial Boundary of 1665, which was meant to delimit overlapping inland claims of the Colony of Virginia and the Province of Carolina, respectively.

In 1812, this area of the river was highly disrupted and was reported to even flow backward because of the 1811–1812 New Madrid series of earthquakes, some of the most powerful ever felt in the United States.

The state of Tennessee contested the inclusion of the Kentucky Bend in the state of Kentucky, claiming it as part of Obion County until at least 1848, but Tennessee eventually dropped its claim.

This area of the Mississippi River, from just east at "Island Number Ten" around to the town of New Madrid, Missouri, was the site of a Civil War battle from February 28 to April 8, 1862, the Battle of Island Number Ten.

Due to its highly productive soil in the river's floodplain, Kentucky Bend was developed as a major cotton-producing area. The 1870 census recorded more than 300 residents. In The West Tennessee Farm edited by Marvin Downing (University of Tennessee at Martin Press, 1979), Norman L. Parks reports a population in 1880 of 303, of whom 18 were African American. By 1900, "large numbers of Negroes in the Bend" were working as laborers to plant and harvest the cotton.

In Mark Twain's book Life on the Mississippi, he described the six-decade-long feud between the Darnell and Watson families and other elements of life in the bend.

== Demographics ==
Historical population
Census	Pop.	Note	%±
1820	2		—
1870	308		—
1880	332		7.8%
1890	322		−3.0%
2000	21		—
2010	18		−14.3%
2020	9		−50.0%

== Climate ==
The Kentucky Bend, like the nearby Missouri Bootheel and Western Tennessee, has a humid subtropical climate (Köppen Cfa) with characteristics of a humid continental climate, and experiences hot, humid summers and chilly, though not severe, winters. Winter weather can vary from very mild and wet when air masses from the Gulf of Mexico predominate, to very cold, dry, and windy with northerly or northwesterly airflows as in the famous cold month of January 1977. On average, 82 nights fall to or below 32 °F or 0 °C, while one night falls to or below 0 °F or −17.8 °C, and the coldest temperature ever was −17 °F or −27.2 °C on February 2, 1951. The hottest was 107 °F or 41.7 °C on July 1, 1952, while an average of 2.9 days exceed 100 °F or 37.8 °C.

Rainfall is fairly heavy throughout the year due to moist air from the Gulf of Mexico being advected on the western side of the Bermuda High, plus occasional remnant depressions from hurricanes passing up the Mississippi Valley. Between 1963 and 2012, the wettest calendar year was 1990 with 71.24 inches or 1,809.5 millimetres and the driest 2005 with 32.36 inches or 821.9 millimetres. The wettest day was September 23, 2006, with 11.38 inches (289.1 mm) in one day, and September 2006 was also the wettest month with 15.27 inches (387.9 mm), while no precipitation fell during October 1964.

Snowfall is common during the winter, with around 9.7 inches or 0.25 metres annually. The most snow in one month was in January 1977 with 13.1 inches or 0.33 metres, while the snowiest season was from July 1966 to June 1967 with 19.3 inches or 0.49 metres.

Climate data for Kentucky Bend
Month	Jan	Feb	Mar	Apr	May	Jun	Jul	Aug	Sep	Oct	Nov	Dec	Year
Record high °F (°C)	78 (26)	79 (26)	86 (30)	97 (36)	98 (37)	106 (41)	107 (42)	106 (41)	104 (40)	100 (38)	85 (29)	79 (26)	107 (42)
Mean daily maximum °F (°C)	41 (5)	49 (9)	59 (15)	70 (21)	78 (26)	86 (30)	91 (33)	90 (32)	82 (28)	72 (22)	60 (16)	47 (8)	69 (21)
Mean daily minimum °F (°C)	23 (−5)	27 (−3)	37 (3)	46 (8)	56 (13)	64 (18)	69 (21)	68 (20)	60 (16)	45 (7)	38 (3)	29 (−2)	47 (8)
Record low °F (°C)	−20 (−29)	−17 (−27)	7 (−14)	23 (−5)	33 (1)	43 (6)	45 (7)	46 (8)	34 (1)	23 (−5)	5 (−15)	−12 (−24)	−20 (−29)
Average precipitation inches (mm)	3.51 (89)	4.07 (103)	4.78 (121)	5.01 (127)	5.39 (137)	4.39 (112)	3.94 (100)	3.23 (82)	3.35 (85)	3.64 (92)	4.78 (121)	5.10 (130)	51.19 (1,299)
Average snowfall inches (cm)	3.7 (9.4)	3.4 (8.6)	1.3 (3.3)	0 (0)	0 (0)	0 (0)	0 (0)	0 (0)	0 (0)	0 (0)	0.3 (0.76)	1 (2.5)	9.7 (24.56)

== See also ==
- Carter Lake, Iowa – City in Iowa, USA
