= Battle of Bentonville order of battle: Union =

The following Union Army units and commanders fought in the Battle of Bentonville of the American Civil War. The Confederate order of battle is shown separately.

== Abbreviations used ==
=== Military rank ===
- MG = Major General
- BG = Brigadier General
- Col = Colonel
- Ltc = Lieutenant Colonel
- Maj = Major
- Cpt = Captain
- Lt = Lieutenant
- Bvt = Brevet

=== Other ===
- w = wounded

== Grand Army of the West ==
MG William T. Sherman, commanding

Headquarters Guard

7th Company, Ohio Sharpshooters

Engineers and Mechanics

1st Michigan: Col John B. Yates
1st Missouri (five companies)

=== Right Wing (Army of the Tennessee) ===
MG Oliver O. Howard

Escort

15th Illinois Cavalry

Pontoon Train Guard

14th Wisconsin, Company E

==== XV Corps ====
MG John A. Logan

Division	Brigade	Regiments and Others
1st Division; Bvt MG Charles R. Woods	1st Brigade Bvt BG William B. Woods	12th Indiana; 26th Iowa; 27th Missouri; 31st/32nd Missouri (6 companies); 76th Ohio
1st Division; Bvt MG Charles R. Woods	2nd Brigade Col Robert F. Catterson	26th Illinois; 40th Illinois; 103rd Illinois; 97th Indiana; 100th Indiana: Col Ruel Johnson; 6th Iowa; 46th Ohio
1st Division; Bvt MG Charles R. Woods	3rd Brigade Col George A. Stone	4th Iowa; 9th Iowa; 25th Iowa; 30th Iowa; 31st Iowa
2nd Division; MG William B. Hazen	1st Brigade Col Theodore Jones	55th Illinois; 116th Illinois; 127th Illinois; 6th Missouri (Companies A and B, 8th Missouri attached): Ltc Delos von Deusen; 30th Ohio; 57th Ohio
2nd Division; MG William B. Hazen	2nd Brigade Col Wells S. Jones	111th Illinois; 83rd Indiana; 37th Ohio; 47th Ohio; 53rd Ohio; 54th Ohio
2nd Division; MG William B. Hazen	3rd Brigade BG John M. Oliver	48th Illinois; 90th Illinois; 99th Indiana; 15th Michigan; 70th Ohio
3rd Division; Bvt MG John E. Smith	1st Brigade BG William T. Clark	63rd Illinois; 93rd Illinois (with detachment non-veterans of 18th Wisconsin); 48th Indiana; 59th Indiana; 4th Minnesota
3rd Division; Bvt MG John E. Smith	2nd Brigade Col Clark R. Wever	56th Illinois; 10th Iowa; 17th Iowa (one company); 26th Missouri (two companies, and detachment, 10th Missouri); 80th Ohio
4th Division; Bvt MG John M. Corse	1st Brigade BG Elliott W. Rice	52nd Illinois; 66th Indiana; 2nd Iowa; 7th Iowa
4th Division; Bvt MG John M. Corse	2nd Brigade Col Robert N. Adams	12th Illinois; 66th Illinois; 81st Ohio
4th Division; Bvt MG John M. Corse	3rd Brigade Col Frederick J. Hurlbut	7th Illinois; 50th Illinois; 57th Illinois; 39th Iowa
4th Division; Bvt MG John M. Corse	Unassigned (not engaged)	110th United States Colored Troops
Artillery Ltc William H. Ross	Battery H, 1st Illinois Light: Cpt Francis DeGress; Battery B, 1st Michigan Light: Lt Edward B. Wright; Battery H, 1st Missouri Light: Cpt Charles M. Callahan; 12th Wisconsin Battery: Cpt William Zickerick	
Unassigned	29th Missouri (Mounted)	

==== XVII Corps ====
MG Francis Preston Blair Jr.

Escort

11th Illinois Cavalry (Company G)

Division	Brigade	Regiments and Others
1st Division; MG Joseph A. Mower	1st Brigade BG John W. Fuller	64th Illinois: Cpt Joseph S. Reynolds; 18th Missouri: Col Charles Sheldon; 27th Ohio; 39th Ohio
1st Division; MG Joseph A. Mower	2nd Brigade Col Milton Montgomery	35th New Jersey; 43rd Ohio; 63rd Ohio; 25th Wisconsin
1st Division; MG Joseph A. Mower	3rd Brigade Col John Tillson	10th Illinois; 25th Indiana; 32nd Wisconsin
3rd Division; BG Manning F. Force	Provost Guard	20th Illinois: Ltc Henry King
3rd Division; BG Manning F. Force	1st Brigade Col Cassius Fairchild	30th Illinois: Col Warren Shedd; 31st Illinois: Col Edwin S. McCook; 45th Illinois: Col John O. Duer; 12th Wisconsin; 16th Wisconsin
3rd Division; BG Manning F. Force	2nd Brigade Col Greenberry F. Wiles	20th Ohio; 68th Ohio; 78th Ohio; 17th Wisconsin
4th Division; Bvt MG Giles A. Smith	1st Brigade BG Benjamin F. Potts	14th/15th Illinois (battalion); 53rd Illinois; 23rd Indiana; 53rd Indiana; 32nd Ohio
4th Division; Bvt MG Giles A. Smith	3rd Brigade BG William W. Belknap	32nd Illinois; 11th Iowa; 13th Iowa; 15th Iowa; 16th Iowa
Artillery Maj Allen C. Waterhouse	Battery C, 1st Michigan Light: Lt William W. Hyser; 1st Minnesota Battery; 15th Ohio Battery	
Unassigned	9th Illinois (mounted)	

=== Left Wing (Army of Georgia, recently the Army of the Cumberland) ===
MG Henry W. Slocum

Staff:

- Chief engineer: Lt William Ludlow

Pontoniers

58th Indiana

==== XIV Corps ====
Bvt MG Jefferson C. Davis

Staff:

- Chief of Staff: Ltc Alexander C. McClurg
- Inspector General: Ltc Henry G. Litchfield

Division	Brigade	Regiments and Others
1st Division; BG William P. Carlin	1st Brigade Bvt BG Harrison C. Hobart	104th Illinois: Maj John Widmer; 42nd Indiana; 88th Indiana; 33rd Ohio: Cpt Joseph Hinson; 94th Ohio; 21st Wisconsin: Maj Charles H. Walker
1st Division; BG William P. Carlin	2nd Brigade Bvt BG George P. Buell	13th Michigan: Maj Willard Eaton (k); 21st Michigan; 69th Ohio
1st Division; BG William P. Carlin	3rd Brigade Ltc David Miles (w); Ltc Arnold McMahon	38th Indiana: Cpt James H. Low (mw); 21st Ohio: Ltc Arnold McMahon; 74th Ohio; 79th Pennsylvania
2nd Division; BG James D. Morgan	Provost Guard	110th Illinois (Companies A & B, 24th Illinois attached)
2nd Division; BG James D. Morgan	1st Brigade BG William Vandever	16th Illinois: Cpt Herman Lund; 60th Illinois; 10th Michigan: Col Charles Lum; 14th Michigan: Ltc George W. Grummond; 17th New York: Cpt Alexander S. Marshall
2nd Division; BG James D. Morgan	2nd Brigade BG John G. Mitchell	34th Illinois: Cpt Peter F. Walker; 78th Illinois: Ltc Maris R. Vernon; 98th Ohio; 108th Ohio; 113th Ohio; 121st Ohio: Maj Aaron Robinson
2nd Division; BG James D. Morgan	3rd Brigade Bvt BG Benjamin D. Fearing (w); Ltc James W. Langley	86th Illinois: Ltc Allen L. Fahnestock; 125th Illinois: Ltc James W. Langley; 22nd Indiana: Cpt William h. Snodgrass; 37th Indiana (one company); 52nd Ohio: Ltc Charles W. Clancy; 85th Illinois
3rd Division; Bvt MG Absalom Baird	1st Brigade Col Morton C. Hunter	82nd Indiana; 23rd Missouri (4 companies); 17th Ohio; 31st Ohio; 89th Ohio; 92nd Ohio (11th Ohio attached)
3rd Division; Bvt MG Absalom Baird	2nd Brigade Ltc Thomas Doan	75th Indiana; 87th Indiana; 101st Indiana; 2nd Minnesota; 105th Ohio
3rd Division; Bvt MG Absalom Baird	3rd Brigade Col George P. Este	74th Indiana; 18th Kentucky; 14th Ohio; 38th Ohio
Artillery Maj Charles Houghtaling	Battery C, 1st Illinois Light: Lt Palmer Scovel; Battery I, 2nd Illinois Light: Lt Judson Rich; 19th Indiana Battery: Lt Samuel D. Webb (k), Lt Clinton Keeler; 5th Wisconsin Battery: Cpt Joseph McKnight	

==== XX Corps ====
Bvt MG Alpheus S. Williams

Division	Brigade	Regiments and Others
1st Division; BG Nathaniel J. Jackson	1st Brigade Col James L. Selfridge	5th Connecticut; 123rd New York: Col James C. Rogers; 141st New York; 46th Pennsylvania
1st Division; BG Nathaniel J. Jackson	2nd Brigade Col William Hawley	2nd Massachusetts; 13th New Jersey: Maj Frederick H. Harris; 107th New York; 150th New York; 3rd Wisconsin
1st Division; BG Nathaniel J. Jackson	3rd Brigade BG James S. Robinson	82nd Illinois: Ltc Edward S. Salomon; 101st Illinois: Ltc John B. LeSage; 143rd New York: Ltc Hezekiah Watkins; 82nd Ohio; 61st Ohio; 31st Wisconsin
2nd Division; Bvt MG John W. Geary	1st Brigade Bvt BG Ario Pardee Jr.	5th Ohio; 29th Ohio; 66th Ohio; 28th Pennsylvania; 147th Pennsylvania
2nd Division; Bvt MG John W. Geary	2nd Brigade Col George W. Mindil	33rd New Jersey; 119th New York; 134th New York; 154th New York; 73rd Pennsylvania; 109th Pennsylvania
2nd Division; Bvt MG John W. Geary	3rd Brigade Bvt BG Henry A. Barnum	60th New York; 102nd New York; 137th New York; 149th New York; 29th Pennsylvania; 111th Pennsylvania
3rd Division; Bvt MG William T. Ward	1st Brigade Col Henry Case	70th Indiana; 79th Ohio; 102nd Illinois; 105th Illinois; 129th Illinois
3rd Division; Bvt MG William T. Ward	2nd Brigade Col Daniel Dustin	33rd Indiana; 85th Indiana; 19th Michigan; 22nd Wisconsin
3rd Division; Bvt MG William T. Ward	3rd Brigade Bvt BG William Cogswell	20th Connecticut: Ltc Philo B. Buckingham; 33rd Massachusetts; 136th New York; 55th Ohio: Col Edwin H. Powers; 73rd Ohio: Ltc Samuel H. Hurst; 26th Wisconsin: Col Frederick C. Winkler
Artillery Maj John A. Reynolds	Battery I, 1st New York Light: Cpt Charles E. Winegar; Battery M, 1st New York Light: Lt Edward P. Newkirk; Battery C, 1st Ohio Light: Lt Jerome Stephens; Battery E, Pennsylvania Light: Cpt Thomas S. Sloan	

=== Cavalry ===
Division	Brigades	Regiments and batteries
3rd Division; Bvt MG Judson Kilpatrick	1st Brigade Col Thomas J. Jordan	3rd Indiana Cavalry (battalion); 8th Indiana Cavalry; 2nd Kentucky Cavalry; 3rd Kentucky Cavalry; 9th Pennsylvania Cavalry
3rd Division; Bvt MG Judson Kilpatrick	2nd Brigade Bvt BG Smith D. Atkins	92nd Illinois (mounted); 9th Ohio Cavalry; 10th Ohio Cavalry; 9th Michigan Cavalry; McLaughlin's (Ohio) Squadron
3rd Division; Bvt MG Judson Kilpatrick	3rd Brigade Col George E. Spencer	1st Alabama Cavalry; 5th Kentucky Cavalry; 5th Ohio Cavalry
3rd Division; Bvt MG Judson Kilpatrick	4th Brigade (provisional) Ltc William B. Way	1st Regiment; 2nd Regiment; 3rd Regiment
3rd Division; Bvt MG Judson Kilpatrick	Artillery	10th Wisconsin Battery

== Sources ==
- Bentonville Battlefield website
- Bradley, Mark L. Last Stand in the Carolinas: The Battle of Bentonville. Campbell, California: Savas Publishing Company, 1996. ISBN 1-882810-02-3.
