= Battle of Bentonville order of battle =

The order of battle for the Battle of Bentonville includes:

- Battle of Bentonville order of battle: Confederate
- Battle of Bentonville order of battle: Union
