= Archibald L. McDougall =

Union Army officer in the American Civil War

Archibald Livingston McDougall
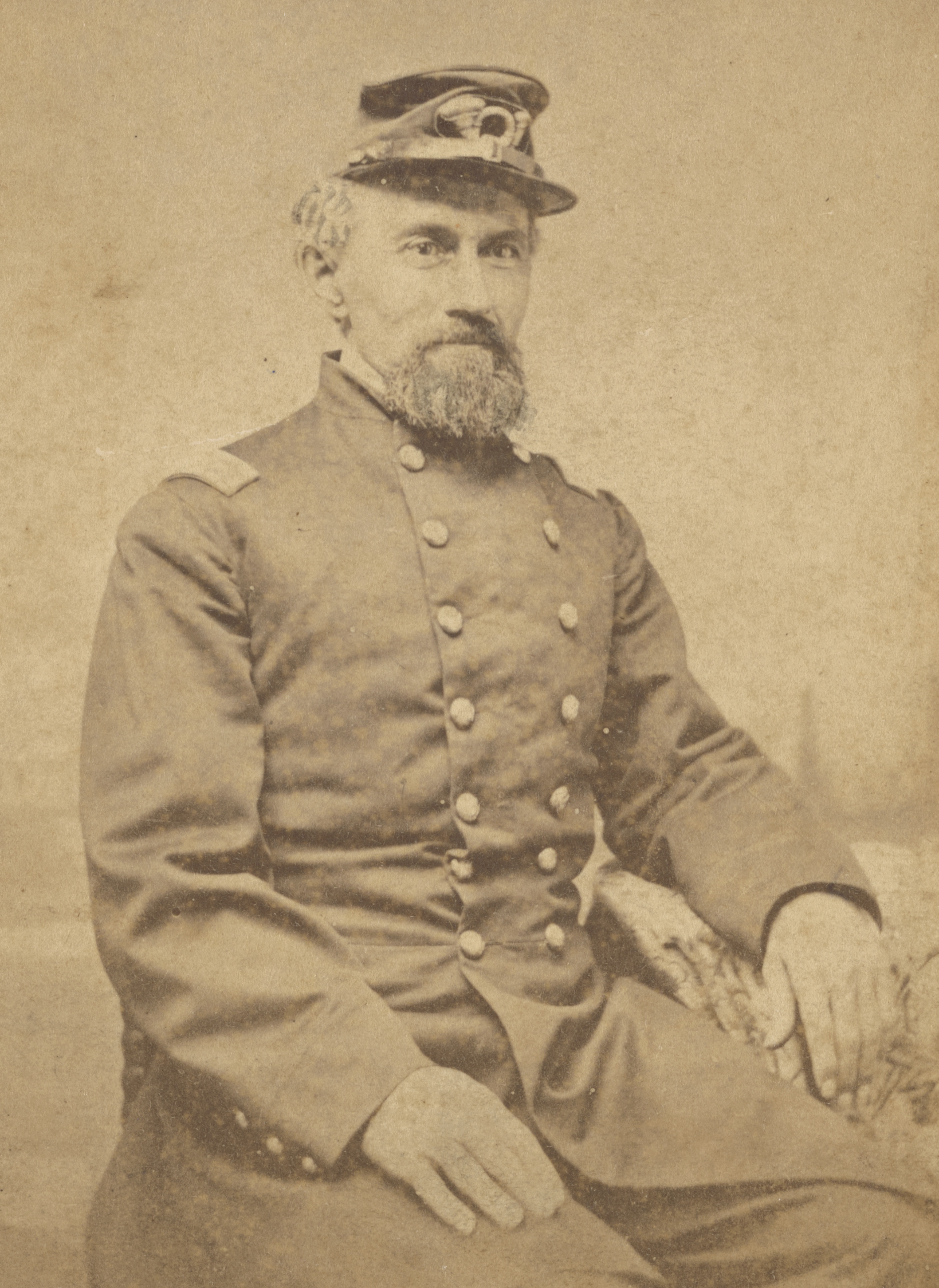
- Born: 1817
- Died: June 23, 1864 (aged 47)
- Military career
- Allegiance: United States of America; Union
- Branch: United States Army; Union Army
- Rank: Colonel
- Commands: 123rd New York Infantry
- Conflicts: American Civil War

Signature of A. L. McDougall, 09/1854 from the Franklin House Hotel Guest Register dating from Sept, 1854 - April, 1855. This register is in the private collection of H. Blair Howell.

Archibald Livingston McDougall (1817 – June 23, 1864) was an officer in the Union Army during the American Civil War who commanded the 123rd New York Volunteer Infantry early in the war and subsequently led a brigade at the Battle of Gettysburg.

== Biography ==
Archibald Livingston McDougall was born in 1817 near East Greenwich in Washington County, New York. In 1848, McDougall married Mary Blanchard (b.1826), with whom he had five children: John (b.1849), William (1854-1886), Mary (b.1856), Jennie McDougall Davison (b.1859), and Grace McDougall Law (b.1861). He worked as a lawyer in Pennsylvania and New York before enlisting for military service in September 1862, during the American Civil War.

McDougall was appointed colonel of Company S of the 123rd New York on July 26, 1862. His regiment joined the 2nd Brigade, 1st Division, XII Corps under Alpheus Williams in time for the Battle of Chancellorsville. After Chancellorsville, the remaining units of the 2nd Brigade were amalgamated into the 1st Brigade of Brig. Gen. Joseph F. Knipe.

When Knipe went on convalescent leave because of an old wound, McDougall became acting brigade commander. He commanded the brigade on the march of XII Corps north that began on June 13, 1863. His brigade served on Culp's Hill, except when it went to the left flank of the army late on July 2, 1863, to help stop the Confederate advance. When they returned to the right flank, McDougall's men almost collided with Confederate troops who had occupied part of Culp's Hill. Knipe returned to XII Corps after Gettysburg, and McDougall rejoined his regiment. He did file a report on his brigade's actions at Gettysburg.

When Maj. Gen. Joseph Hooker took XII Corps and two divisions of XI Corps to the relief of the Army of the Cumberland, besieged in Chattanooga, Williams’ division was assigned to guard supply lines. Thus it missed the battles in which Brig. Gen. John W. Geary’s 2nd Division participated.

McDougall's regiment joined the new XX Corps in the Army of the Cumberland. He was wounded in the leg at the Battle of New Hope Church, Georgia on May 25, 1864. Surgeons amputated the leg, but McDougall died on June 23, 1864, at an officers’ hospital in Chattanooga, Tennessee.
