= William C. Cooper (politician) =

American politician

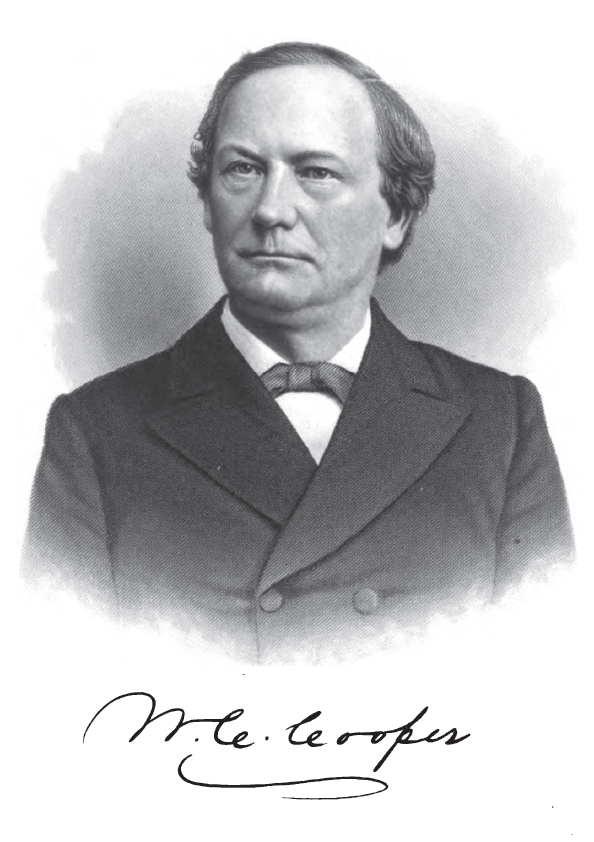

Member of the U.S. House of Representatives from Ohio's 9th district
- In office March 4, 1885 – March 3, 1891
- Preceded by: James S. Robinson
- Succeeded by: Joseph H. Outhwaite

Member of the Ohio House of Representatives from the Knox County district
- In office January 1, 1872 – January 4, 1874
- Preceded by: John D. Thompson
- Succeeded by: Allen J. Beach

Personal details
- Born: William Craig Cooper; December 18, 1832 Mount Vernon, Ohio, US
- Died: August 29, 1902 (aged 69) Mount Vernon, Ohio, US
- Resting place: Mound View Cemetery
- Party: Republican

William Craig Cooper (December 18, 1832 – August 29, 1902) was an American lawyer, Civil War veteran, and politician who served three terms as a U.S. representative from Ohio from 1885 to 1891.

== Biography ==
Born in Mount Vernon, Ohio, Cooper attended the public schools and Mount Vernon Academy. He studied law. He was admitted to the bar in 1852 and commenced practice in Mount Vernon, Ohio.

=== Early career ===
He served as prosecuting attorney of Knox County 1859-1863. He served as mayor of Mount Vernon 1862-1864.

=== Civil War ===
During the American Civil War, Cooper was colonel of the 142nd Ohio Infantry, a 100 days regiment.

=== Early political career ===
He served as a member of the State house of representatives 1872-1874. He served as judge advocate general of Ohio 1879-1884. He served as member and president of the board of education of Mount Vernon.

=== Congress ===
Cooper was elected as a Republican to the Forty-ninth, Fiftieth, and Fifty-first Congresses (March 4, 1885 – March 3, 1891). He was not a candidate for renomination in 1890.

=== Later career and death ===
He resumed the practice of law in Mount Vernon, Ohio, where he died on August 29, 1902. He was interred in Mound View Cemetery.

== Sources ==
- United States Congress. "William C. Cooper (id: C000765)". Biographical Directory of the United States Congress.

U.S. House of Representatives
Preceded by James S. Robinson	United States Representative from Ohio's 9th congressional district 1885–1891	Succeeded by Joseph H. Outhwaite
