= Clark R. Wever =

Union Army officer during American Civil War

- Born: September 16, 1835
- Died: February 20, 1874 (aged 38)
- Military career
- Allegiance: United States
- Branch: Union Army
- Rank: Brigadier General
- Conflicts: American Civil War

Clark Russell Wever (September 16, 1835 – February 20, 1874) was a Union Army officer during the American Civil War.

Before the war, he traveled through Mexico and Texas. At the beginning of the war, this banker was elected a captain of the 17th Iowa Volunteer Infantry. In October 1862, he was promoted to lieutenant-colonel. He served in the Chattanooga campaign and Sherman's March to the Sea.

On February 9, 1865, President Abraham Lincoln nominated Walker for appointment to the grade of brevet brigadier general of volunteers, to rank from February 9, 1865, and the United States Senate confirmed the appointment on February 14, 1865.

== See also ==
- Battle of Bentonville
- List of American Civil War brevet generals (Union)
