= Lucius Read House =

Underground Railroad station in Byron, Illinois, U.S.

Lucius Read House and Byron Museum of History
- Location within Illinois
- 42°7′33.55″N 89°15′23.33″W
- Location: 110 N. Union Street, Byron, Illinois

History
- Built: 1843

Site notes
- Website: www.byronmuseum.org

Lucius Read House, the site of the Byron Museum of History, was an Underground Railroad station along a network of stations to the Northern states and Canada. Located in Byron, Illinois, it was one of three stations in the strongly anti-slavery town from 1850 to 1862. Refugees received fresh clothing, food, shelter, and transportation to the next station. Lucius Read's stepsons and stepdaughter are notable for their roles in the events leading up to and during the American Civil War.

== Underground Railroad ==
Lucius Read was a stationmaster, who secretly helped enslaved people make it through the area. He was a member of the Congregational church, where most members were abolitionists, including the pastor George Gammell (1843–1862). The Lucius Read House is the only surviving structure of three Underground Railroad stations in Byron from 1850 to 1862. The barns of the Dresser and Tanner family were the other two stations.

Enslaved people who ran away were called "fugitive slaves" at the time. They had to be careful of slave catchers who could capture enslaved people in the free states, like Illinois, and return them to their slave holders in the South. Many escapees chose to go to Canada, where they would be safe from slave hunters. It was a crime for anyone in the United States to harbor or aid freedom seekers. So the Reads had to be careful for their own sake, too.

Some freedom seekers who came to the Read house were taken to the basement where they were provided food, a fresh set of clothing, and shelter. Within the house there were hidden stairwells and secret doors. When transported by the Read family, freedom seekers hid in false bottoms of their wagon.

== The Read family ==
Lucius migrated from Vermont to Illinois in 1836 with his first wife, Emily Read. They initially built a log house and about 1843, they built a brick house. It is one of the oldest houses in Byron.

Lucius Read's second wife Tryphenia was the mother of Sam and Luke Parsons who fought with John Brown. Read's stepdaughter Addie M. Parsons served with the 92nd Illinois Infantry Regiment. Her brother Sam and a nephew enlisted in the 92nd and she received permission from the captain of the regiment to travel with them and serve the unit. She brought a sewing kit and stationery with her on the railroad trip to Cairo, Illinois with the regiment. She set up in the hospital tent. Many of the soldiers in the regiment knew her and had gone to school with her in Bryon. She fulfilled requests to mend clothing and write letters, and was soon busy working with physicians and hospital stewards to care for soldiers with typhoid fever, malaria, and other illnesses or injuries. She did not receive pay for her work, so the soldiers in the regiment each gave her money until none of the soldiers received more than she did. Once the regiment moved to the front, she went to Missouri and worked in a hospital in St. Louis and in the Benton barracks until the 92nd regiment mustered out. She married an Army surgeon. Addie M. Parson's name appears with the soldiers on a monument to Company B of the 92nd Illinois Infantry in Byron's public square. Read family members lived in the house until the early 1900s.

Lucius and his first wife Emily had a daughter, Lydia Read Artz. Publisher of the Byron Express newspaper, she shared her memories of the family's role in the Underground Railroad in the newspapers August 10, 1900 edition. She told of the last group of people who sought refuge in their house in 1862.

== Museum and historical building ==
The Lucius Read House, built in 1843, is one of thirteen sites in Illinois on the National Underground Railroad Network to Freedom beginning in 2002 and the same year the National Park Service recognized the building as an official landmark. The house has been used as an inn, tavern, restaurant, Byron Express newspaper business, and a meeting place for the Congregational church.

Since 1993, the building houses the Byron Museum of History. The museum has farming, railroad, and Underground Railroad exhibits, as well as an exhibit for Albert Spalding, the baseball player and manager. The museum has one of the Quilts of the Underground Railroad. Since it was a crime to teach slaves how to read, symbols on the quilt provided codes for how to escape to the north.
