= John Walker Rankin =

American politician (1823–1869)

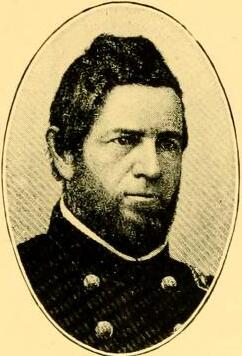
- Portrait of Rankin in a 1908 publication
- Born: June 11, 1823; Washington County, Pennsylvania
- Died: July 10, 1869 (aged 46); Keokuk, Iowa
- Military career
- Rank: Colonel
- Unit: 17th Iowa Volunteer Infantry Regiment
- Known for: Member, Iowa State Senate, 1858-1862
- Conflicts: American Civil War
- Other work: Lawyer and state senator

John Walker Rankin (June 11, 1823 – July 10, 1869) was an American politician and judge. Described as "one of the most eminent lawyers of Iowa" by The Toledo Chronicle, he served as a member of the Iowa State Senate from 1858 to 1867.

== Biography ==
Born in Washington County, Pennsylvania, on June 11, 1823, Rankin graduated from Washington & Jefferson College. He then taught school and studied law.

Rankin was subsequently admitted to the Pennsylvania bar. In 1848, Rankin moved to Keokuk, Lee County, Iowa, where he continued to practice law.

During the American Civil War, Rankin helped to recruit men for the 17th Iowa Volunteer Infantry Regiment, and was then commissioned as its colonel.

In 1857, Rankin was appointed Iowa District Court judge for Lee County. From 1858 to 1862, Rankin served in the Iowa State Senate and was a Republican.

== Death ==
Rankin died at his home in Keokuk, Iowa, on July 10, 1869.
