= 142nd Ohio Infantry Regiment =

- Active: May 13, 1864, to September 2, 1864
- Country: United States
- Allegiance: Union
- Branch: Infantry

The 142nd Ohio Infantry Regiment, sometimes 142nd Regiment, Ohio Volunteer Infantry (or 142nd OVI) was an infantry regiment in the Union Army during the American Civil War.

== Service ==
The 142nd OVI was organized at Camp Chase in Columbus, Ohio, and mustered on May 13, 1864, for 100 days' service under the command of Colonel William Craig Cooper.

The regiment moved to Martinsburg, West Virginia, May 14, 1864; then to Washington, D.C., May 19. Duty at Fort Lyon, near Alexandria, Virginia, until June 3. Attached to 2nd Brigade, DeRussy's Division, XXII Corps. Embarked at Alexandria, Virginia, for White House, Virginia, June 7. Duty guarding supply trains through the Wilderness to the front near Cold Harbor, Virginia, June 9–14. Moved to Point of Rocks, Virginia, and duty there until August 19.

The 142nd OVI mustered out of service September 2, 1864, at Camp Chase.

== Ohio National Guard ==
Over 35,000 Ohio National Guardsmen were federalized and organized into regiments for 100 days' service in May 1864. Shipped to the Eastern Theater, they were designed to be placed in "safe" rear areas to protect railroads and supply points, thereby freeing regular troops for Lt. Gen. Ulysses S. Grant’s push on the Confederate capital of Richmond, Virginia. As events transpired, many units found themselves in combat, stationed in the path of Confederate Gen. Jubal Early’s veteran Army of the Valley during its famed Valley Campaigns of 1864. Ohio Guard units met the battle-tested foe head on and helped blunt the Confederate offensive thereby saving Washington, D.C. from capture. Ohio National Guard units participated in the battles of Monacacy, Fort Stevens, Harpers Ferry, and in the siege of Petersburg. The 142nd OVI did not participate in any battles.

== Casualties ==
The regiment lost 43 men during service; 1 officer and 42 all due to disease.

== Commanders ==
- Colonel William Craig Cooper

== Notable members ==
- Colonel William Craig Cooper - U.S. Representative from Ohio, 1885-1891

== See also ==
- List of Ohio Civil War units
- Ohio in the Civil War
