= James C. Rogers =

American Civil War Union army general (1838–1907)

James Clarence Rogers
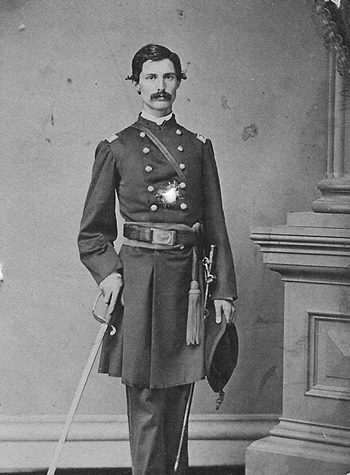
- Born: October 29, 1838; Hudson Falls, New York, U.S.
- Died: February 9, 1907 (aged 68); Sandy Hill, New York, U.S.
- Burial place: Union Cemetery, Fort Edward, New York
- Education: Union College
- Military career
- Allegiance: United States (Union)
- Branch: United States Army (Union Army)
- Service years: 1861–1865
- Rank: Colonel; Bvt. Brigadier General
- Unit: 43rd New York Infantry Regiment
- Commands: 123rd New York Infantry Regiment
- Conflicts: American Civil War: Gettysburg campaign; Battle of Gettysburg; Sherman's March to the Sea

James Clarence Rogers (1838-1907) was an American Brevet Brigadier General who commanded the 123rd New York Infantry Regiment in the American Civil War. He was known for being the commander of the 123rd New York during the Battle of Gettysburg. He would later become a lawyer and a member of the New York State Assembly, representing Washington County.

== Early years ==
James was born on October 29, 1838, as the son of Charles Rogers and Susan A. Clark. Rogers spent his early education attending the Fort Edward Institute before attending Union College, studying law before graduating in 1860 and became a member of the Bar Association a year later.

=== American Civil War ===
When the American Civil War broke out, Rogers formed a company that eventually became part of the 43rd New York Infantry Regiment. Rogers briefly served in the 43rd New York as a captain of the company before on July 22, 1861, a meeting was held at Argyle, New York to form a regiment which would later become the 123rd New York Infantry Regiment upon its inception on September 4, 1862.

Rogers was promoted to Lieutenant Colonel on August 18, 1862, and to full colonel on May 13, 1863. Rogers would go on to participate at the Battle of Gettysburg as part of the XII Corps. He would go on to participate at Sherman's March to the Sea and several battles of the campaign. Rogers was given command of the 1st Brigade of the 1st Division of the XX Corps and he was promoted to Brevet Brigadier General on March 13, 1865, before mustered out along with the 123rd New York on June 8, 1865.

=== Later years ===
After the war, Rogers returned to Sandy Hill to continue his legal career and became a member of the New York State Assembly, representing Washington County. He would also be involved in other cases at Warren County. Rogers was a member of the Grand Army of the Republic around this time. Rogers was also known for being an orator and becoming successful enough to be in high demand as well as being able to give a dedicatory address when a monument of the 123rd New York at Gettysburg was erected in September 1903.

In 1889, Rogers became a candidate to become the Republican state senator for New York but was beaten by Michael F. Collins. Rogers was also a member of the Chi Psi and the Phi Beta Kappa.

== See also ==
- List of American Civil War brevet generals (Union)
