= 129th Illinois Infantry Regiment =

129th Regiment Illinois Volunteer Infantry
- Illinois state flag
- Active: September 8, 1862, to June 8, 1865
- Country: United States
- Allegiance: Union
- Branch: Infantry
- Engagements: Battle of Resaca; Battle of Kennesaw Mountain; Siege of Atlanta; March to the Sea; Battle of Bentonville

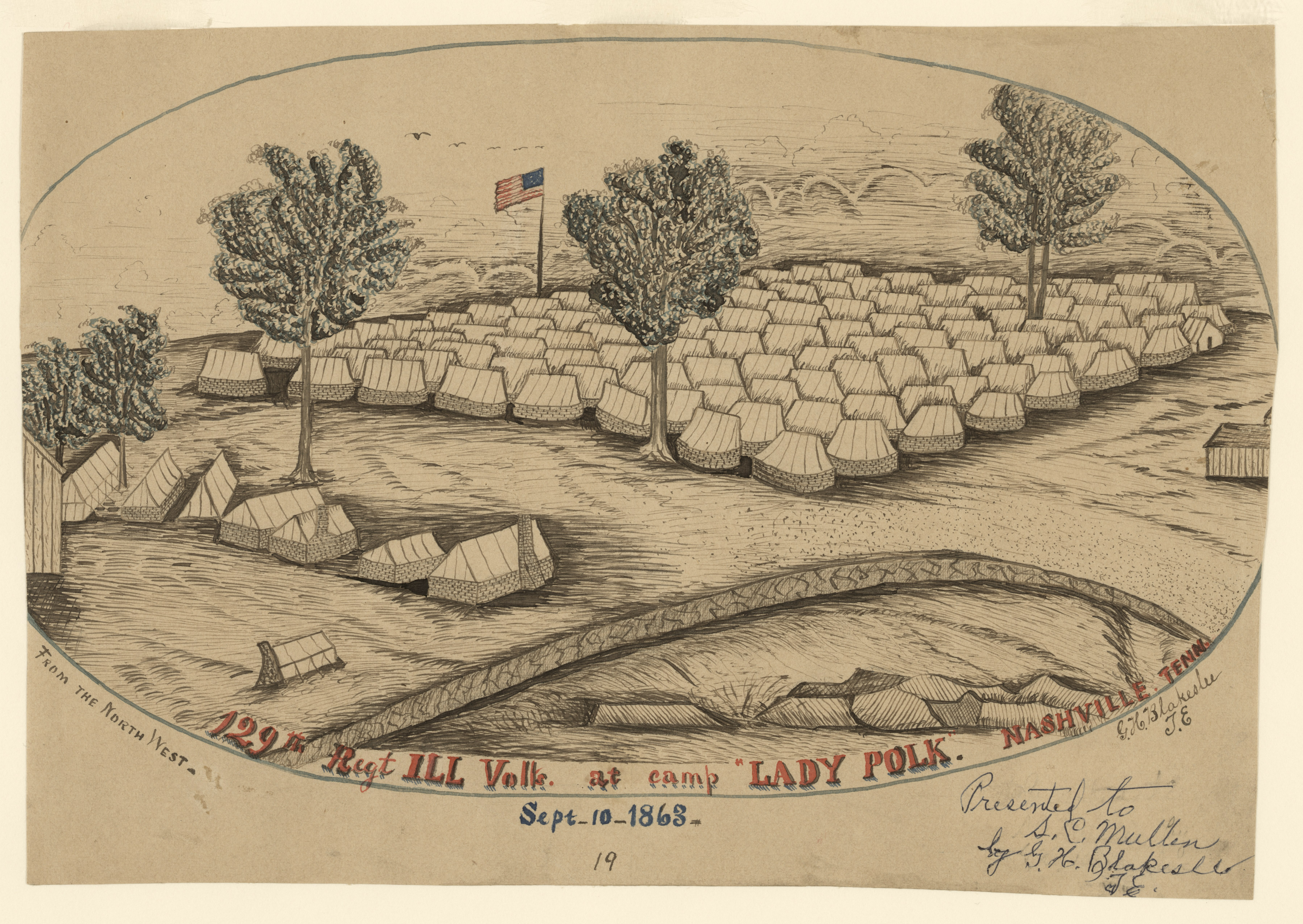
Camp "Lady Polk" of the 129th Illinois Infantry Regiment at Nashville

The 129th Regiment Illinois Volunteer Infantry was an American infantry regiment that served in the Union Army during the American Civil War.

== Service ==
The 129th Illinois Infantry was organized at Pontiac, Illinois, and mustered into Federal service on September 8, 1862, for a three-year enlistment.

The regiment was mustered out of service on June 8, 1865.

== Total strength and casualties ==
The regiment suffered 50 enlisted men who were killed in action or who died of their wounds and 2 officers and 128 enlisted men who died of disease, for a total of 180 fatalities.

== Commanders ==
- Colonel George P. Smith -resigned on May 8, 1863.
- Colonel Henry Case - mustered out with the regiment.

== See also ==
- List of Illinois Civil War Units
- Illinois in the American Civil War
