= Henry Case =

American Union Army officer (1823–1884)

Henry Case (November 19, 1823 – March 12, 1884) was an American lawyer, Congregational minister, and Union Army officer who was brevetted brigadier general during the American Civil War. He was one of the founders of the Delta Kappa Epsilon fraternity at Yale College.

== Early life and education ==
Case, son of Deacon Samuel and Sally (Bailey) Case, was born in Norwich, Connecticut, on November 19, 1823. On June 22, 1844, he and 14 other members of Yale's class of 1846 founded Delta Kappa Epsilon. He graduated from Yale College in 1846.

== Career ==
After graduating, Case studied law in Norwich and began practice in Winchester, Illinois, later moving to Middletown, Connecticut. He then completed a two-year course at the Yale Divinity School and was ordained an evangelist at Norwich on July 31, 1855. He went straight to Ohio and served as stated preacher, first at McConnelsville and then at Cuyahoga Falls. After some years, he went back to practicing law.

=== Civil War ===
Case was one of the first field officers of the 129th Illinois Infantry, serving as its lieutenant colonel. The regiment was organized at Pontiac, Illinois, in August 1862. In May 1863 he was appointed colonel of the regiment, and he served in that role for two years.

The 129th Illinois served in the First Brigade, Third Division, XX Corps. It fought in the Atlanta campaign, including the battles of Resaca and Peachtree Creek, went with William Tecumseh Sherman on the March to the Sea, and took part in the Carolinas campaign, including the battles of Averasborough and Bentonville. On March 16, 1865, Case led troops that drove back the Confederate brigade under Colonel A. M. Rhett in Cumberland County, North Carolina. He was brevetted brigadier general in March 1865.

=== Later career ===
After the war, Case reopened his law office in Jacksonville, Illinois.

== Personal life and death ==
Case never married. As his health failed, he moved back to his father's house in Norwich. He died there on March 12, 1884, at age 60.
