= George P. Estey =

American civil war general

George Peabody Estey
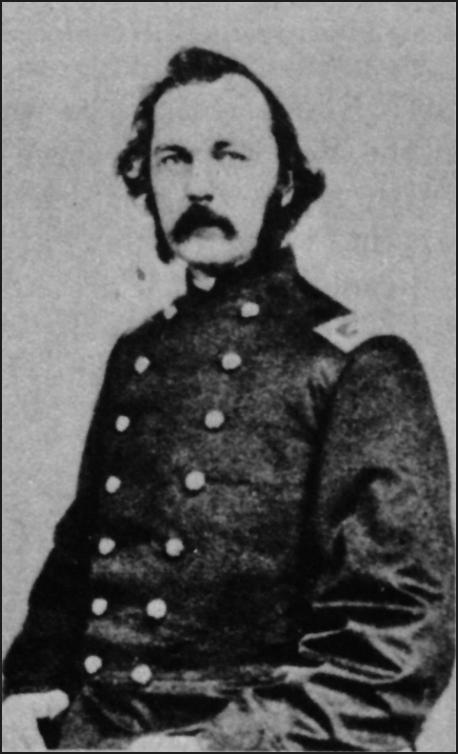
- George P. Estey during the Civil War
- Born: April 24, 1829; Nashua, New Hampshire
- Died: February 6, 1881 (aged 51); Manhattan, New York
- Burial place: Nashua, New Hampshire
- Other name: George Peabody Este
- Military career
- Allegiance: United States of America; Union
- Branch: Union Army
- Service years: 1861–1865
- Rank: Brigadier General
- Commands: 14th Ohio Infantry Regiment; 3rd Bde, 3rd Div, XIV Corps; 3rd Division, XIV Corps; 2nd Bde, 3rd Div, XIV Corps
- Conflicts: American Civil War
- Other work: lawyer

George Peabody Estey (1829–1881), also spelled Este, was a Union Army general during the American Civil War.

== Biography ==
George P. Estey was born on April 24, 1829, in Nashua, New Hampshire. For some time, he attended Dartmouth College, though he didn't graduate, and he briefly moved to California and Illinois to study law before settling in Toledo, Ohio. There he practiced in partnership with future Chief Justice Morrison R. Waite.

When the Civil War began, he became lieutenant colonel of the 14th Ohio Infantry Regiment, a three-months unit that eventually reorganized for three years of service. With his men, he fought in the Western Virginia Campaign and in Kentucky before being promoted to colonel, again serving in the Tullahoma Campaign. By the time of the Atlanta campaign, he commanded a brigade of the XIV Corps. He received a leg wound while leading a bayonet charge at the Battle of Jonesborough, receiving praise from division commander Absalom Baird. During the Savannah Campaign, on December 9, 1964, he was brevetted brigadier general. He then participated in the Carolinas campaign. On June 26, 1865, he was appointed full brigadier general, the confirmation by Congress coming just in 1866 after he had resigned in December.

After the war, he returned to practicing law in Washington, D.C. for the remainder of his life. He died from pneumonia in Manhattan, New York, on February 6, 1881, and was interred at his birthplace.

== See also ==
- List of American Civil War generals (Union)

== Sources ==
- Warner, Ezra J. (1964). Generals in Blue: Lives of the Union Commanders. Baton Rouge, LA: Louisiana State University Press. ISBN 0-8071-0822-7.
- Eicher, John H. and David J. (2001). Civil War High Commands. Stanford, CA: Stanford University Press. ISBN 0-8047-3641-3.
- Welsh, Jack D. (2005). Medical Histories of Union Generals. Kent, OH: Kent State University Press. ISBN 0873388534.
