= 82nd Ohio Infantry Regiment =

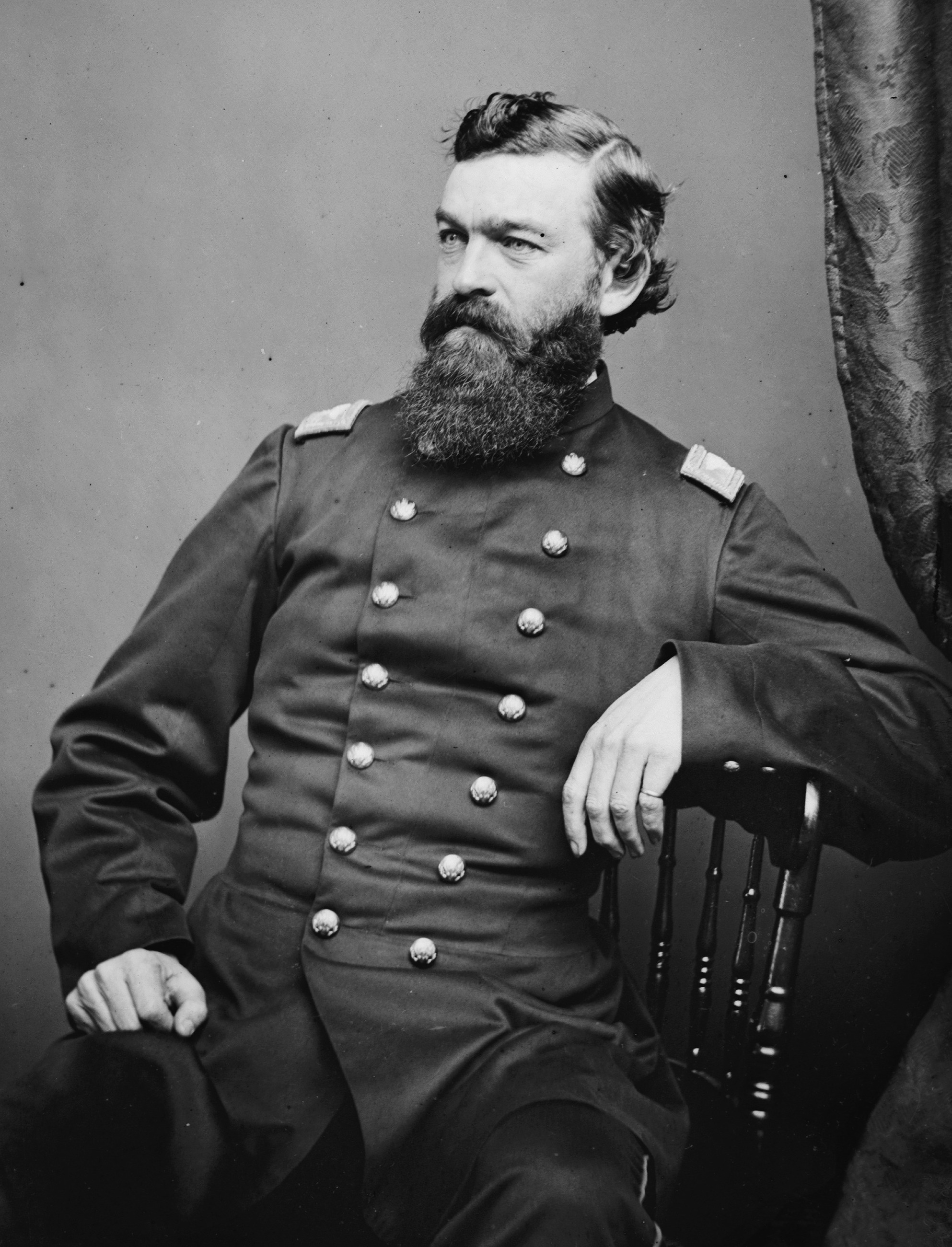
- Colonel James Sidney Robinson, one of the first commanders of the 82nd Ohio Infantry.
- Active: October 1861 to July 29, 1865
- Country: United States
- Allegiance: Union
- Branch: Infantry
- Engagements: Battle of McDowell; Battle of Cross Keys; Battle of Cedar Mountain; First Battle of Rappahannock Station; Second Battle of Bull Run; Battle of Chancellorsville; Gettysburg campaign; Battle of Gettysburg; Battle of Wauhatchie; Chattanooga campaign; Battle of Missionary Ridge; Atlanta campaign; Battle of Resaca; Battle of Dallas; Battle of New Hope Church; Battle of Allatoona; Battle of Kennesaw Mountain; Battle of Peachtree Creek; Siege of Atlanta; Sherman's March to the Sea; Carolinas campaign; Battle of Averasborough Battle of Bentonville

The 82nd Ohio Infantry Regiment, sometimes 82nd Ohio Volunteer Infantry (or 82nd OVI) was an infantry regiment in the Union Army during the American Civil War.

== Service ==
The 82nd Ohio Infantry was organized in Kenton, Ohio October through December 1861 and mustered in on December 31, 1861, for three years service under the command of Colonel James Cantwell.

The regiment was attached to District of Cumberland, Maryland, Department of Western Virginia, to March 1862. Cumberland, Maryland, Department of the Mountains, to April 1862. Schenck's Brigade, Department of the Mountains, to June 1862. Milroy's Independent Brigade, I Corps, Army of Virginia, to September 1862. Headquarters 3rd Division, XI Corps, Army of the Potomac, to December 1862. Headquarters XI Corps to May 1863. 2nd Brigade, 3rd Division, XI Corps, to July 1863. 1st Brigade, 3rd Division, XI Corps, Army of the Potomac, to October 1863, and Army of the Cumberland to April 1864. 3rd Brigade, 1st Division, XX Corps, Army of the Potomac, to July 1865.

The 82nd Ohio Infantry mustered out of service at Louisville, Kentucky, on July 29, 1865.

== Detailed service ==
This regiment was organized at Kenton, Hardin County, from Oct. to Dec., 1861, to serve for three years, with an aggregate of 968 men. In Jan., 1862, it moved for Western Virginia, and was first under fire at the battle of Bull Pasture Mountain. It joined in the pursuit of Jackson up the valley; fought in the Battle of Cross Keys, was also present at Cedar Mountain, and participated in a sharp skirmish at Freeman's Ford. The destruction of Waterloo Bridge being ordered, the work was entrusted to this regiment and a select party dashed forward under a brisk fire, ignited the timbers, and in a few moments the work of destruction was complete. At the Second Bull Run the regiment lost heavily. It went into winter quarters at Stafford Court House and in the following April moved on the Chancellorsville Campaign. In the battle of that name it moved steadily into the entrenchments and opened a rapid fire upon the advancing foe. As the enemy swept around the flanks of the regiment it was forced to retreat and when it reached its new position only 134 men were with the colors. It was on duty in the trenches or on the picket line until the army commenced to retire. The regiment went into action at Gettysburg with 22 commissioned officers and 236 men, of whom 19 officers and 147 men were killed, wounded or captured, leaving only 3 officers and 89 men; but this little band brought off the colors safely. In the autumn following the regiment was ordered to join the Army of the Cumberland and at Wauhatchie, Tenn., it led the advance up the steep and rugged slope, driving the Confederates from the summit. It was held in reserve during the engagement at Orchard knob, but it moved up under a heavy fire from the batteries on Missionary ridge and assisted in the skirmishing which followed that engagement, and in building the entrenchments. In November it moved to the relief of Knoxville, but Longstreet having raised the siege it returned to Lookout Valley. There, of 349 enlisted men present, 321 were mustered into the service as veteran volunteers in Jan., 1864. After a furlough home the regiment, rejoined its brigade in March and soon afterward entered upon the Atlanta Campaign. It participated in the charge at Resaca, but sustained little loss, as the enemy was too much surprised and embarrassed to fire effectively. It was one of the first regiments in position at Peachtree Creek and lost not less than 75 in killed and wounded. During the siege of Atlanta it held an important and exposed position on a hill adjoining Marietta Street, being within range both of artillery and musketry, and on one occasion a cannon shot carried away the regimental colors, tearing them to shreds. The regiment remained in camp at Atlanta, engaged in work on the fortifications for a time, and then started with Sherman's army for Savannah. It met with nothing worthy of particular note until Wheeler's cavalry was encountered at Sandersville, where one company assisted in dislodging the enemy. The regiment moved on the Carolinas Campaign and performed its full share of marching, foraging and corduroying. It participated in the affairs at Averasboro and Bentonville, having 10 men wounded in the former and in the latter 11 wounded and 14 missing. It was mustered out on July 24, 1865.

== Casualties ==
The regiment lost a total of 257 men during service; 16 officers and 122 enlisted men killed or mortally wounded, 1 officer and 118 enlisted men died of disease.

== Commanders ==
- Colonel James Cantwell - killed in action at the second battle of Bull Run
- Colonel James Sidney Robinson
- Lieutenant Colonel David Thompson - commanded at the battle of Gettysburg after Colonel Robinson was wounded; commanded during the Chattanooga Campaign

== Notable members ==
- Private Delano Morey, Company B - Medal of Honor recipient for action at the battle of McDowell, May 8, 1862
- Colonel James Sidney Robinson - U.S. Representative from Ohio, 1881–1885; Ohio Secretary of State, 1885–1889
- Private William Haliday Williams, Company C - Medal of Honor recipient for action at the battle of Peachtree Creek, July 20, 1864

== See also ==
- List of Ohio Civil War units
- Ohio in the Civil War
