= 123rd New York Infantry Regiment =

- Active: September 4, 1862 to June 8, 1865
- Country: United States
- Allegiance: Union
- Branch: Infantry
- Engagements: American Civil War: Battle of Chancellorsville; Battle of Gettysburg; Atlanta campaign; Battle of Resaca; Battle of New Hope Church; Battle of Allatoona; Battle of Kolb's Farm; Battle of Kennesaw Mountain; Battle of Peachtree Creek; Siege of Atlanta; Sherman's March to the Sea; Carolinas campaign; Battle of Bentonville

Commanders
- Colonel: Archibald Livingston McDougall
- Colonel: Ambrose Stevens
- Colonel: James C. Rogers

Insignia
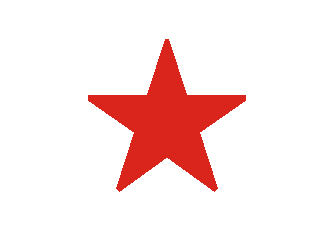
- 1st Division, XII/XX Corps

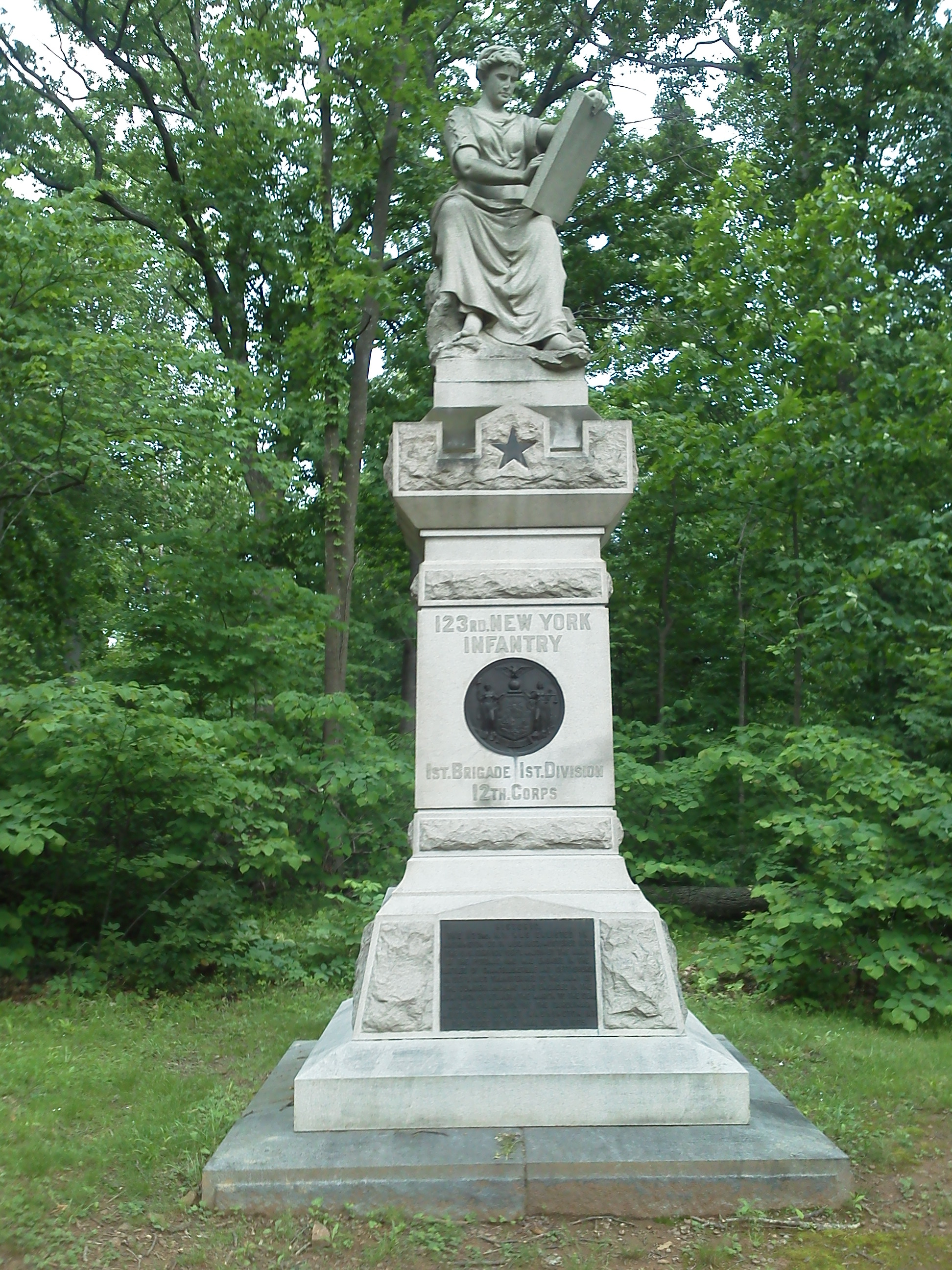
123rd Regiment monument at Gettysburg

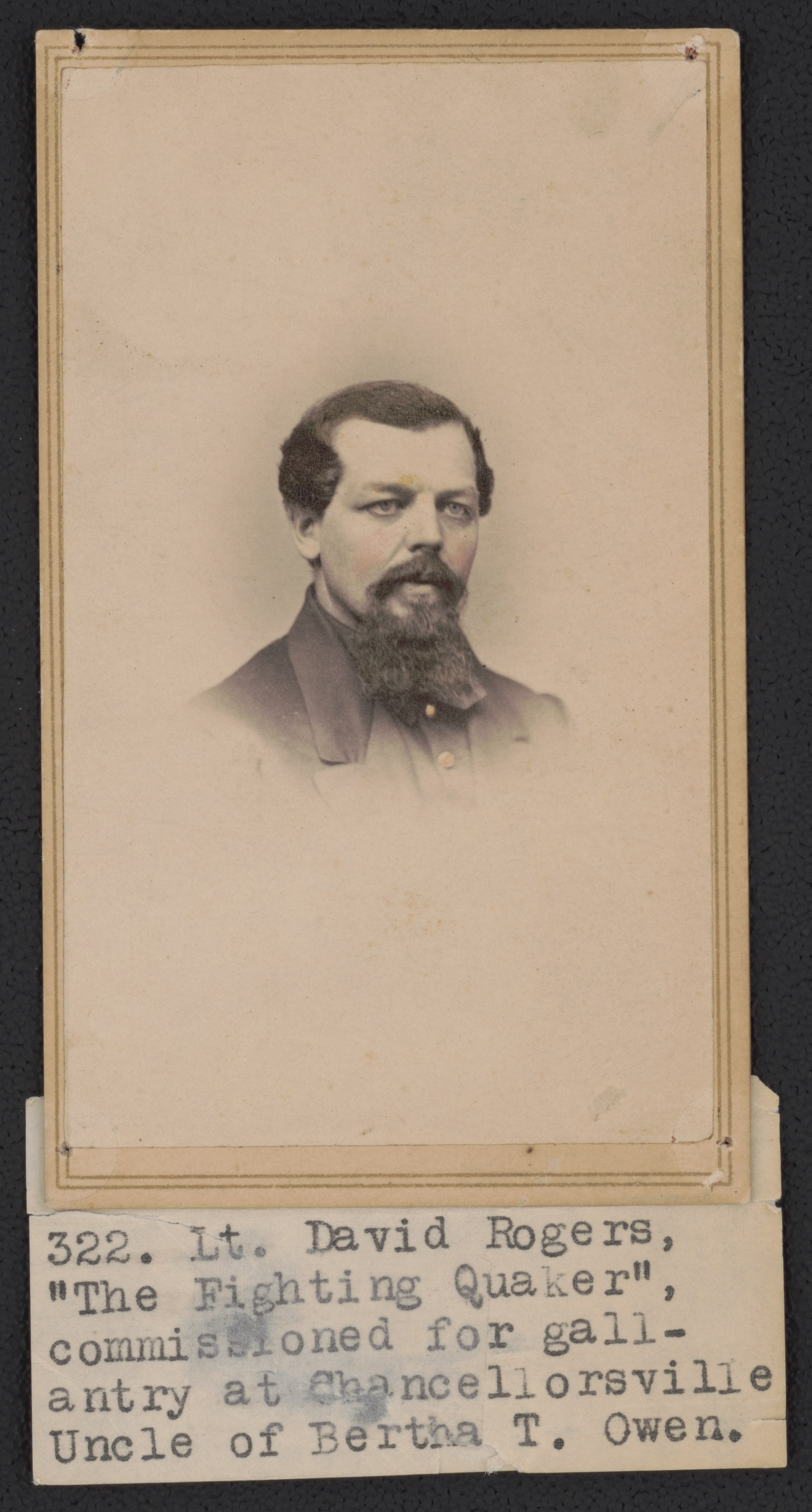
Second Lieutenant David W. Rogers, "The Fighting Quaker", commissioned for gallantry at Chancellorsville, of Co. K, 123rd New York Infantry Regiment. From the Liljenquist Family Collection of Civil War Photographs, Prints and Photographs Division, Library of Congress

The 123rd New York Infantry Regiment was an infantry regiment in the Union Army during the American Civil War.

== Service ==
The 123rd New York Infantry was organized at Salem, New York and mustered in for three years service on September 4, 1862, under the command of Colonel Archibald Livingston McDougall.

The regiment was attached to 2nd Brigade, 1st Division, XII Corps, Army of the Potomac, to May 1863. 1st Brigade, 1st Division, XII Corps, Army of the Potomac, to October 1863, and Army of the Cumberland to April 1864. 1st Brigade, 1st Division, XX Corps, Army of the Cumberland, to June 1865.

The 123rd New York Infantry mustered out of service June 8, 1865. Recruits and veterans were transferred to the 60th New York Volunteer Infantry.

== Detailed service ==
Left New York for Washington, D.C., September 5, 1862. Duty in the defenses of Washington, D.C., until September 29, 1862, and at Frederick, Md., and Sandy Hook until December 13, 1862. Moved to support Burnside at Fredericksburg, Va., December 10–14. At Stafford Court House until April 27, 1863. "Mud March" January 20–24. Chancellorsville Campaign April 27-May 6. Battle of Chancellorsville May 1–5. Gettysburg Campaign June 11-July 24. Battle of Gettysburg July 1–3. Pursuit of Lee to Manassas Gap, Va., July 5–24. Duty on line of the Rappahannock River until September. Moved to Bealeton Station, Va., then to Stevenson, Ala., September 24-October 4. Guard duty along Nashville & Chattanooga Railroad until April 1864. Action near Tullahoma, Tenn., March 16, 1864. Atlanta Campaign May 1-September 8. Operations against Rocky Faced Ridge May 8–11. Battle of Resaca May 14–15. Near Cassville May 19. Advance on Dallas May 22–25. New Hope Church May 25. Battles about Dallas, New Hope Church, and Allatoona Hills May 26-June 5. Operations about Marietta and against Kennesaw Mountain June 10-July 2. Pine Hill June 11–14. Lost Mountain June 15–17. Gilgal or Golgotha Church June 15. Muddy Creek June 17. Noyes' Creek June 19. Kolb's Farm June 22. Assault on Kennesaw Mountain June 27. Ruff's Station, Smyrna Camp Ground, July 4. Chattahoochie River July 5–17. Peach Tree Creek July 19–20. Siege of Atlanta July 22-August 25. Operations at Chattahoochie River Bridge August 26-September 2. Occupation of Atlanta September 2-November 15. March to the sea November 15-December 10. Siege of Savannah December 10–21. Carolinas Campaign January to April 1865. Thompson's Creek, near Chesterfield Court House, S.C., and near Cheraw March 2. Averysboro, N.C., March 16. Battle of Bentonville March 19–21. Occupation of Goldsboro March 24, and of Raleigh April 14. Bennett's House April 26. Surrender of Johnston and his army. March to Washington, D.C., via Richmond, Va., April 29-May 20. Grand Review of the Armies May 24.

== Casualties ==
The regiment lost a total of 167 men during service; 6 officers and 66 enlisted men killed or mortally wounded, 95 enlisted men died of disease.

== Commanders ==
- Colonel Archibald Livingston McDougall
- Colonel Ambrose Stevens
- Colonel James C. Rogers - commanded at the Battle of Gettysburg while at the rank of lieutenant colonel

== See also ==
- List of New York Civil War regiments
- New York in the Civil War
