= 14th Ohio Infantry Regiment =

- Active: April 25, 1861, to August 13, 1861 (3 months); August 14, 1861, to July 11, 1865 (3 years)
- Country: United States
- Allegiance: Union
- Branch: Union Army
- Type: Infantry
- Engagements: Battle of Philippi; Battle of Laurel Hill; Battle of Corrick's Ford; Battle of Wildcat Mountain; Battle of Mill Springs (Company C); Siege of Corinth; Battle of Perryville; Tullahoma Campaign; Battle of Chickamauga; Siege of Chattanooga; Battle of Missionary Ridge; Atlanta campaign; Battle of Resaca; Battle of Kennesaw Mountain; Siege of Atlanta; Battle of Jonesborough; Sherman's March to the Sea; Carolinas campaign; Battle of Bentonville

Insignia
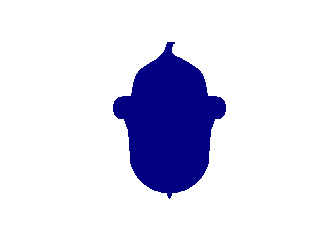
- 2nd Brigade, 3rd Division XIV Corps, Army of the Cumberland/Army of the Ohio

The 14th Ohio Infantry Regiment was an infantry regiment in the Union Army during the American Civil War.

== Service ==
=== Three-months regiment ===
The 14th Ohio Infantry Regiment was organized at Toledo, Ohio, on April 25, 1861, under Colonel James Blair Steedman in response to President Lincoln's call for 75,000 volunteers. The regiment moved to Cleveland, Ohio, April 25, then to Columbus, Ohio, May 22. Left Ohio for western Virginia May 27. Moved to Clarksburg May 29, and to Phillippi June 2. Action at Philippi June 3. Western Virginia Campaign June 6–17. Laurel Hill July 7. Belington July 8. Pursuit of Garnett July 13–17. Carrick's Ford July 13–14. Ordered to Toledo July 22. The regiment were mustered out August 13, 1861.

=== Three-years regiment ===
The 14th Ohio Infantry was reorganized at Toledo on August 14-September 5, 1861, and mustered in for three years service.

==== Attachments ====
Attached To	Dates
Thomas' Command, Camp Dick Robinson, Ky.	to November 1861
2nd Brigade, Army of the Ohio	to December 1861
2nd Brigade, 1st Division, Army of the Ohio	to September 1862
2nd Brigade, 1st Division, III Corps, Army of the Ohio	to November 1862
2nd Brigade, 3rd Division, Center, XIV Corps, Army of the Cumberland	to January 1863
2nd Brigade, 3rd Division, XIV Corps	to October 1863
3rd Brigade, 3rd Division, XIV Corps	to July 1865

The 14th Ohio Infantry mustered out of service at Louisville, Kentucky, on July 11, 1865.

== Detailed service ==
Date(s)	Actions/Events
1861
August 23	Moved to Cincinnati, Ohio
August 25	Moved to Frankfort, Ky.
August 28	Moved to Nicholasville
October 2 to January 1	At Camp Dick Robinson and Lebanon, Ky.
October 21	Action at Camp Wild Cat, Rockcastle Hills
1862
January 1–15	Advance on Camp Hamilton
January 19–20	Action at Logan's Cross Roads or Fishing Creek (Company C)
January 19–20	Battle of Mill Springs
January 21-February 11	Duty at Mill Springs
February 11-March 2	Moved to Louisville, Ky., thence to Nashville, Tenn.
March 20-April 7	March to Savannah, Tenn.
April 12–13	At Bear Creek, Ala.
April 29-May 30	Advance on and siege of Corinth, Miss.
June to August	Duty at Iuka, Miss. and Tuscumbia, Ala.
August 7	Action at Decatur, Ala.
August 20-September 26	March to Nashville, Tenn., thence to Louisville, Ky.
September 29–30	Rolling Fork
October 1–16	Pursuit of Bragg into Kentucky
October 8	Battle of Perryville, Ky. (headquarters guard). March to Gallatin, Tenn., duty there until January 13, 1863
December 22 to January 2	Operations against Morgan
December 29	At Boston
1863
January 13	Moved to Nashville thence to Murfreesboro, Tenn., with duty there until June
March 4–14	Expedition toward Columbia
June 23-July 7	Tullahoma Campaign
June 24–26	Hoover's Gap
July 1	Tullahoma
July 2-August 16	Occupation of middle Tennessee
August 16-September 22	Passage of the Cumberland Mountains and Tennessee River, and Chickamauga Campaign
September 19–21	Battle of Chickamauga
September 24-November 23	Siege of Chattanooga, Tenn.
November 23–27	Chattanooga-Ringgold Campaign
November 23–24	Orchard Knob
November 25	Missionary Ridge
December 17	Reenlisted
1864
May 1-September 8	Atlanta Campaign
May 8–11	Demonstrations on Rocky Faced Ridge
May 14–15	Battle of Resaca
May 18–25	Advance on Dallas
May 25-June 5	Operations on line of Pumpkin Vine Creek and battles about Dallas, New Hope Church and Allatoona Hills
June 10-July 2	Operations about Marietta and against Kennesaw Mountain
June 11–14.	Pine Hill
June 15–17	Lost Mountain
June 19	Pine Knob, near Marietta
June 27	Assault on Kennesaw
July 4	Ruff's Station
July 5–17	Chattahoochie River
July 19–20	Peachtree Creek
July 22-August 25	Siege of Atlanta
August 5–7	Utoy Creek
August 25–30	Flank movement on Jonesboro
August 31-September 1	Battle of Jonesboro
September 29-November 3	Operations against Hood in northern Georgia and northern Alabama
November 15-December 10	March to the sea
December 10–21	Siege of Savannah
1865
January to April	Campaign of the Carolinas
March 11	Fayetteville, N. C
March 19–21	Battle of Bentonville
March 24	Occupation of Goldsboro
April 10–14	Advance on Raleigh
April 14	Occupation of Raleigh
April 26	Bennett's House
April 29-May 19	Surrender of Johnston and his army. March to Washington, D.C., via Richmond, Va
May 24	Grand Review of the Armies
June 15	Moved to Louisville, Ky

== Casualties ==
The regiment lost a total of 332 men during service; 5 officers and 141 enlisted men killed or mortally wounded, 1 officer and 185 enlisted men died of disease.

== Commanders ==
- Colonel James Blair Steedman
- Colonel George P. Este - commanded at the battle of Perryville as lieutenant colonel
- Lieutenant Colonel Henry D. Kingsbury - commanded at the battle of Chickamauga

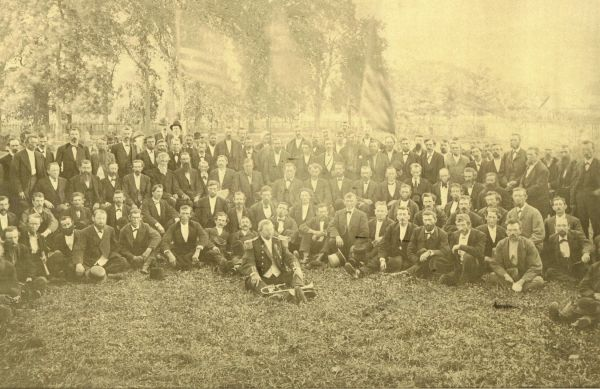
14th Ohio Volunteer Infantry Reunion 1877

== See also ==
- List of Ohio Civil War units
- Ohio in the Civil War
- Bibliography of Ulysses S. Grant
