= Smith D. Atkins =

American newspaper editor, lawyer, and army officer (1836–1913)

Smith Dykins Atkins
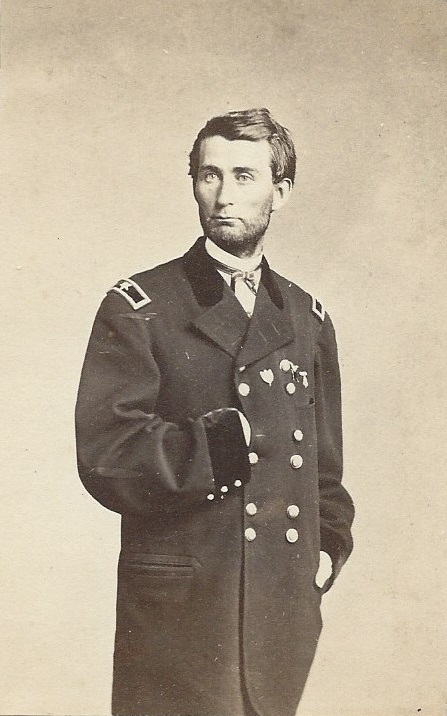
- Atkins in 1865
- Born: June 9, 1836; Horseheads, New York, U.S.
- Died: March 27, 1913 (aged 76); Freeport, Illinois, U.S.
- Burial place: City Cemetery, Freeport
- Military career
- Allegiance: United States
- Branch: Union army
- Service years: 1861–65
- Rank: Colonel; Bvt. Major General
- Unit: 11th Illinois Infantry
- Commands: 92nd Illinois Mounted Infantry
- Conflicts: American Civil War; Western Theater of the American Civil War; Savannah campaign
- Other work: newspaper editor, postmaster, author

Signature
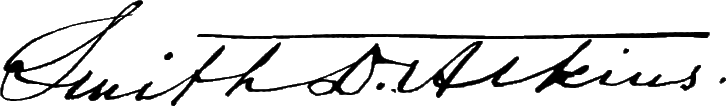

Smith Dykins Atkins (June 9, 1836 – March 27, 1913) was an American newspaper editor, lawyer, and army officer who served in the American Civil War as a colonel. Serving in the Union army, he commanded brigades of infantry and cavalry and was awarded the brevet grades of brigadier general and major general of Volunteers. After hostilities ended in 1865, Atkins returned to his editorial work and became an author.

== Early life and career ==
Atkins was born in Horseheads, New York, in 1836. He moved to Illinois in 1845 and later entered the Rock River Seminary in Mount Morris. He also became editor of the town's Gazette and began practicing law. He was a supporter of and canvasser for Abraham Lincoln for President of the United States. He was elected Prosecuting Attorney in 1860. He was the first man to enlist as a volunteer private soldier in Stephenson County, Illinois upon the outbreak of the American Civil War.

== Civil War service ==
Upon Lincoln's call for 75,000 volunteer militiamen at the outbreak of the Civil War, Atkins immediately chose to defend the Union cause and entered the volunteer ranks of his home state. He served in the western theater of the conflict. He was appointed a captain in the 11th Illinois Infantry on April 30, 1861, and was promoted to major on March 21, 1862. By April he was assistant adjutant general of the 4th Division in the Army of the Tennessee, but resigned on April 17 to take a two-month respite from duty for health reasons.

Atkins re-entered military service that fall when he was appointed the colonel of the 92nd Illinois Mounted Infantry on September 4, 1862. By February 1863 he was given brigade command in the Army of Kentucky (Department of the Cumberland) until June 8. Next he commanded a brigade in the Army of the Cumberland's Reserve Corps until July 15, when he was transferred to the Department's Cavalry Corps. He then commanded two brigades of cavalry of the Department of the Cumberland and one in the Military Department of the Mississippi in 1864 and into 1865. During these commands, he led a brigade of cavalry during Major General Sherman's March to the Sea.

Although Atkins was not appointed as a full, substantive grade general, on January 23, 1865, President Abraham Lincoln nominated Atkins to the grade of brevet brigadier general of volunteers, to rank from January 12, 1865, and the U.S. Senate confirmed the award on February 14, 1865. Atkins was mustered out of the volunteer service on June 21, 1865 and he returned to his civilian life in Illinois. On March 21, 1866, President Andrew Johnson nominated Atkins for the award of the grade of brevet major general of volunteers, to rank from March 13, 1865, and the U.S. Senate confirmed the award on April 26, 1866.

== Brigade commands ==
Smith Dykins Atkins commanded several brigades in the Union Army during the American Civil War. The units and dates were:

=== Infantry ===
- 2nd Brigade, Absalom Baird's Division, Department of the Cumberland (February – June 8, 1863)
- 1st Brigade, 1st Division, Reserve Corps, Army of the Cumberland (June 8 – July 15, 1863)

=== Cavalry ===
- 3rd Brigade, 2nd Division, Cavalry Corps, Department of the Cumberland (January 28 – February 20, 1864)
- 3rd Brigade, 3rd Division, Cavalry Corps, Department of the Cumberland (May 13 – May 21, 1864)
- 2nd Brigade, 3rd Division, Cavalry Corps, Military Division of the Mississippi (November 5, 1864 – January 12, 1865)

== Marriage to Ella Swain ==
As the Civil War ended, General Atkins was in charge of the forces occupying the college town of Chapel Hill, North Carolina. On April 17, 1865 (Easter Sunday), Atkins paid a visit to the home of David Swain, the president of the University of North Carolina. Both men shared a love of history. While the two were talking, President Swain's daughter Ella brought them a history book. Atkins soon began courting Ella, and the couple were married on August 23, 1865. The marriage was controversial, and Ella's mother would not eat at the same table with Atkins. The couple resided in Freeport. Atkins and Ella had six children, three of whom survived to adulthood. Ella died of influenza at age 38, and was buried in [Historic] Oakwood Cemetery in Raleigh, North Carolina. The story is related in the book Undaunted Heart: The True Story of a Southern Belle & a Yankee General by Suzy Barile, published by Eno Publishers in 2009. Barile is a great-great-granddaughter of Ella Swain and Smith Atkins.

== Postbellum ==
Atkins became editor of Freeport's Daily Journal newspaper and also was the city's postmaster for 24 years. He published a number of short works, and speeches late in life. He was the first president of the Freeport Public Library, and a member of the board of education. He was also active in veterans' organizations and affairs. Atkins died in Freeport in 1913, and is buried there in City Cemetery.

== Works ==
- Democracy and Dred Scott (1860; essay)
- With Sherman's Cavalry Marching Through Georgia (1870; essay)
- "Chickamauga. Useless, Disastrous Battle" (1907; speech)
- "Abraham Lincoln" (1909; speech)

== See also ==
- List of American Civil War Generals (Union)
