= 92nd Illinois Infantry Regiment =

92nd Illinois Infantry Regiment; 92nd Illinois Mounted Infantry Regiment
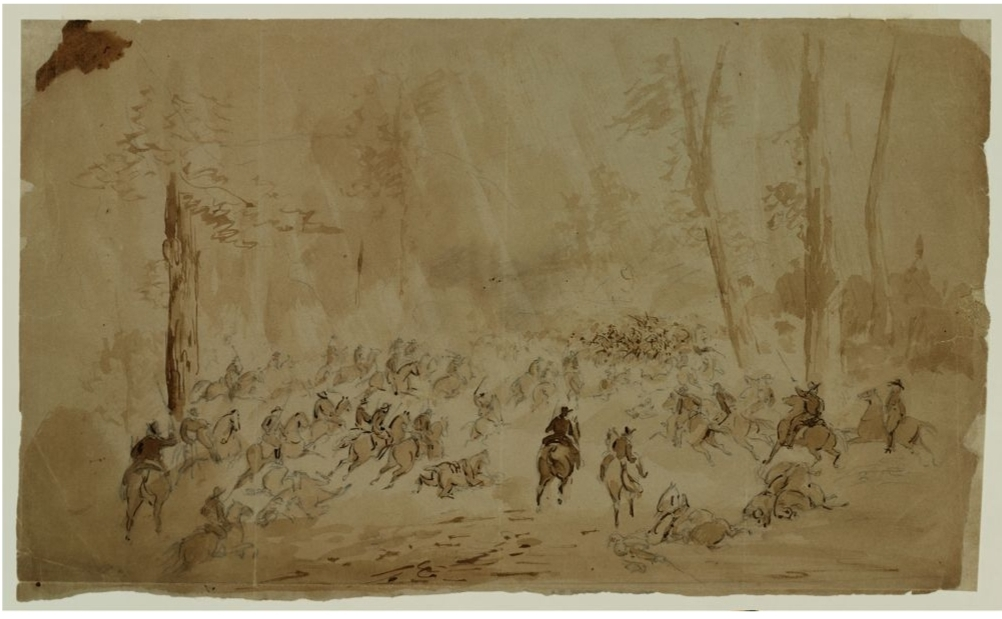
- Charge of the 92nd Illinois Mounted Infantry near Kingston, Georgia, June 23, 1864
- Active: September 4, 1862, to July 10, 1865
- Country: United States
- Allegiance: Union
- Branch: Infantry; Mounted Infantry (1863–1864)
- Equipment: Spencer repeating rifle
- Engagements: Battle of Franklin (1863); Tullahoma Campaign; Battle of Chickamauga; Chattanooga campaign; Battle of Lookout Mountain; Atlanta campaign; Savannah Campaign

Insignia
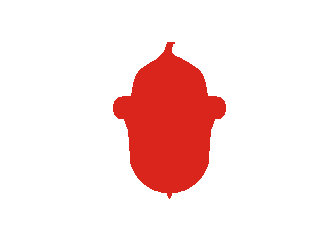
- 1st Division, XIV Corps

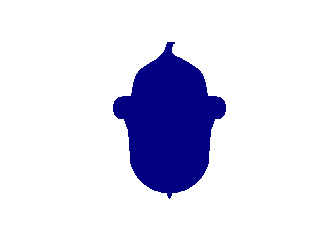
- 4th Division, XIV Corps

The 92nd Regiment Illinois Infantry, also known as 92nd Illinois Mounted Infantry Regiment, was an infantry and mounted infantry regiment that served in the Union Army during the American Civil War.

== Service ==
The 92nd Illinois Volunteer Infantry was organized at Rockford, Illinois and mustered into Federal service on September 4, 1862. It was composed of 10 companies, five from Ogle County, three from Stephenson County, and two from Carroll County.

=== Companies in this Regiment with County of Origin ===
Men often enlisted in a company recruited in the counties where they lived though not always. After many battles, companies might be combined because so many men were killed or wounded.

The following counties of origin are taken from the Adjutant General's Report, found on the Illinois Civil War Rosters web site. Roster pages are from the same report found on the Internet Archives web site. The rosters show the men who served in each regiment, their residences, dates of enlistment and mustering out, and other remarks.

Company A - many men from Stephenson County - Stephenson County web site - Roster, vol. 5, pages 335-337.

Company B - many men from Ogle County - Ogle County web site - Roster, vol. 5, pages 337-339.

Company C - many men from Carroll County - Carroll County web site - Roster, vol. 5, pages 339-341.

Company D - many men from Ogle County - Ogle County web site - Roster, vol. 5, pages 341-343.

Company E - many men from Ogle County - Ogle County web site - Roster, vol. 5, pages 343-345.

Company F - many men from Stephenson County - Stephenson County web site - Roster, vol. 5, pages 345-347.

Company G - many men from Stephenson County - Stephenson County web site - Roster, vol. 5, pages 348-350.

Company H - many men from Ogle County - Ogle County web site - Roster, vol. 5, pages 350-352.

Company I - many men from Caroll County - Carroll County web site - Roster, vol. 5, pages 352-354.

Company K - many men from Ogle County - Ogle County web site - Roster, vol. 5, pages 354-356.

Unassigned Recruits -Roster, vol. 5, pages 356-357.

The Civil War Soldiers and Sailors database lists 1,952 men on its roster for this unit. Roster.

The regiment elected twenty-seven-year-old Colonel Smith D. Atkins as its commander, and he received his commission as the regiment's Colonel on September 4, 1862. He was a newspaperman, lawyer, and ardent abolitionist in Illinois prior to the war. Enlisting as a private, he commanded Company A, 11th Illinois Infantry at Fort Donelson and was promoted to Major in March 1862. While home on leave in the summer of 1862 recovering from illness, he collected new volunteers and formed the 92nd.

The regiment remained drilling in Rockford until 10 October 1862.The next day it departed, with orders to report to Gen. Wright, at Cincinnati, where it was assigned to Cochran's brigade, Gen. Baird's division, Army of Kentucky.

== Initial infantry service ==
The 92nd marched into the interior of Kentucky, and during the latter part of October, 1863 was stationed at Mt. Sterling, Kentucky to guard that place against rebel raids. It saw some action there where it moved through Danville.

In this time, Atkins had a falling out with the corps commander, General Gordon Granger. Atkins was a radical abolitionist, and he took President Lincoln's Emancipation Proclamation as a personal mandate to liberate every slave he could. Around Mt. Sterling and Danville, Atkins rounded up local slaves and took them with him, upsetting some local inhabitants and some of his fellow officers. In mid-November, a slave owner named William Hickman sued Atkins in the Fayette Circuit Court to get his "property" back. General Granger forced Atkins to return the slaves. Several officers of the brigade also signed a letter to Atkins requesting that he return the slaves to prevent further embarrassment of the army and " wounding the feelings of men who are unswerving in their loyalty and patriotism ... we expect you to turn them out of your lines."

Because of this betrayal and despite his subsequent rise to brigade command in Granger's brigade, Atkins could not wait to leave the corps. He felt alienated and betrayed by Granger, Baird, and some of his fellow brigade officers. The regiment and division moved south towards Nashville at the end of the year. Colonel Cochrane resigned his command for health reasons on 13 January 1863, and Colonel Atkins as senior regimental commander assumed command of the brigade, so Lieutenant Colonel Benjamin F. Sheets took command of the regiment.. At Nashville, the regiment, with General Baird's division transferred to the Army of the Cumberland on 26 January 1863.

In February, the command moved to Franklin, Tennessee, and was engaged in the pursuit of the rebel Gen. Van Dorn. This culminated in the regiment's participation in the 10 April 1863 defeat of Van Dorn at the Battle of Franklin.

=== Conversion to mounted infantry ===
As part of the Tullahoma Campaign, it advanced to Murfreesboro, skirmished around Guy's Gap, and occupied Shelbyville, 27 June. On 1 July, the conflict between Colonel Atkins and Major General Granger ruptured, On 3 July, the regiment detached from Granger's brigade, marched to Wartrace, and was engaged in rebuilding a wagon-bridge over Duck River from 5–6 July. At this time, Colonel Wilder first came into contact with the regiment. Lieutenant Colonel Sheets and the 92nd impressed him. Wilder and the officers of the 92nd discussed the possibility of the 92nd joining Wilder's brigade. Wilder suggested the transfer, and Atkins submitted a request for the 92nd to join Brigadier General John T. Wilder's Lightning Brigade.

The requested transfer came through on July 10, 1863, the regiment was detached from General Granger's Corps and assigned a place in Brigadier General John T. Wilder's Lightning Brigade, where it remained while Gen. Rosecrans had command. On 19 July the regiment joined Wilder's brigade while it was in Decherd, Tennessee. When Colonel Atkins heard that the 92nd was mounting and rearming with Colonel Wilder, he got approval from Rosecrans to resign his post as a brigade commander to rejoin the 92nd as its commander again. (Note: While somewhat surprising that Akins would relinquish his brigade command, he later wrote, "I was determined to get out from Granger's command, even if I had to resign from the Army.")

With the transfer, the 92nd Illinois Infantry converted to mounted infantry. Finding mounts for it became the brigade's priority. The brigade conducted two foraging expeditions, one in early July and one in mid July to round up horses for Atkins's men. Atkins needed to rapidly mount the soldiers of the regiment in order to serve as mounted infantry. From 22 to 26 July, a detachment of 200 men of the regiment accompanied by the 98th Illinois captured 1700 horses and mules and liberated 800 slaves who were quickly mustered into a black regiment in Nashville. There were enough horses taken to mount the regiment.

The next task was to rearm with Spencer rifles. On August 1, all the Spencers not in use in the other regiments of the brigade were turned over to the 92nd, enough to completely arm three companies, D, E and F. The remaining companies had a handful of Spencer rifles, and a mix of breech-loading carbines (including Spencers) and some of their originally issued Enfield muzzle-loaders.

As they converted to mounted infantry under the guidance of Wilder and others in the brigade, they took to the Spencer finding it a superior weapon that permitted them to take on an enemy that outnumbered them with confidence. COL Atkins expressed their appreciation for their new weapon saying, "The Spencer rifles made the sweetest music that was heard during the war for the Union." Also, the rapidity of movement afforded by their mounts gave them a rapid response ability that could take and maintain the initiative from the rebels. The 92nd completed its mounting, equipping, and training in five weeks; something the rest of the brigade took four months to accomplish.

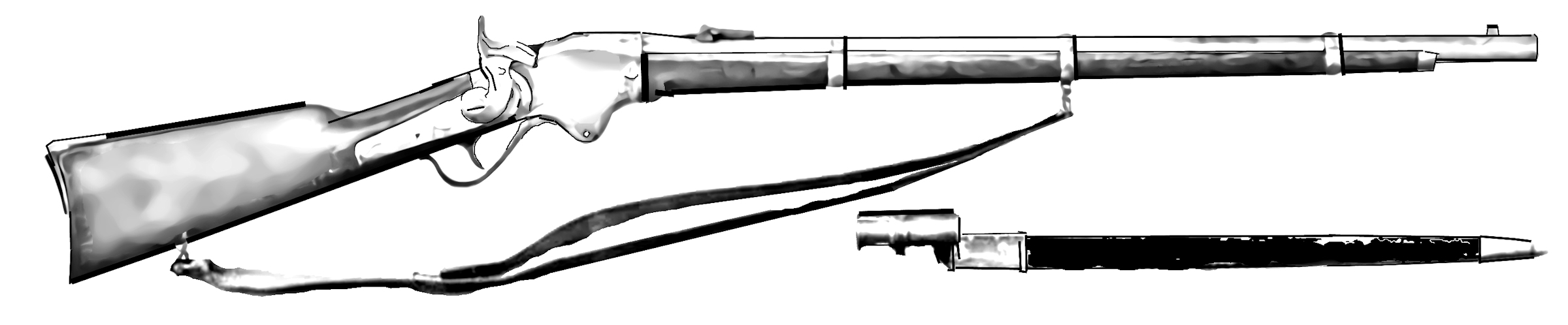
1862 Spencer Rifle with sling and bayonet

=== Deception at Chattanooga ===
By the middle of August, the 92nd was ready for operations. Rosecrans sent the brigade to General Crittenden's XXI Corps to conduct deception operations along the bank north of the Tennessee River at Chattanooga. In company with William B. Hazen's infantry, George D. Wagner's, and Robert H. G. Minty's cavalry brigade, their mission was to sprint ahead of Crittenden's Corps to the Tennessee River, and visibly show its presence to the Confederate cavalry screening the south bank. The remainder of the corps would spread out across the Cumberland Plateau heading north of Chattanooga, while the Rosecrans' other two corps crossed the river below Chattanooga and Bragg. Once the other corps were safely across the river, the XXI Corps would fall in behind them leaving the four brigades to keep Bragg focused across the river to the north bank. The four brigades would patrol the river, make as much noise as possible, and feign river crossing operations north of the city. That was what Bragg feared most, a crossing north of Chattanooga. This was all part of Rosecrans plan to take Chattanooga by maneuver versus pitched battle.

Wilder's brigade moved out from its headquarters on 16 August, ascending the Plateau and camping that night at Sewanee, Tennessee near the University of the South. The brigade and Minty's cavalrymen led the advance. Those two brigades would move quickly to reach the river while Hazen and Wagner would make their best speed to follow. The 92nd and its companions quickly worked their way towards the Tennessee River, through Dunlap, reaching Poe's Tavern, to the northeast of Chattanoogas Ridge on August 20. The steep slopes of the Cumberland Plateau and Walden's Ridge were difficult terrain, and there was a dearth of forage, but the two brigades still made good time in their advance.

At dawn on 21 August, the command moved to the Tennessee River to begin their deception. Wilder and Minty divided the north bank between their brigades. The 92nd and its brigade mates covered southern side, from city to Sale Creek, and Minty's men from there north to the mouth of the Hiawassee River. Wagner and Hazen's brigades, traveling afoot were still crossing the mountains. Once they arrived, they would join the force already there to keep Bragg distracted.

The 92nd went with the 98th and a section of Lilly's battery ten miles up the Tennessee River toward Minty to the ferry at Harrison's Landing. After securing the ferry and destroying the lone rebel gun on the south side, they began trying to keep the Confederates on the opposite bank distracted. When Wagner and Hazen's brigades arrived on August 29, some of Hazen's dismounted infantry joined the 92nd and 98th at Harrison's landing to aid in the misdirection. The deception operation included the 92nd and its compatriots faking boat construction by hammering, sawing, and tossing bits of lumber into the river at Harrison's Landing so that it would float downstream to Chattanooga. The 92nd also joined the rest of the force in the nightly ritual of building numerous campfires to imitate the look of numerous regimental camps. The whole operation also benefited from the fact that the local population north of the river in Eastern Tennessee on the Cumberland Plateau was strongly Unionist which meant that any Rebels operating there would be quickly reported back to the Army of the Cumberland; in light of this Bragg and no cavalry screen patrolling that could see through the deception.

The 92nd played its part in the successful operation that kept Bragg in the dark. In the midst of this operation, Bragg had already decided to abandon Chattanooga (Rosecran's goal) and was planning to withdraw to a more defensible position further south. As the newcomer to the brigade, the 92nd occasionally found itself detached for independent duties. On such a detachment on 4 September, the regiment crossed the mountains at Dechard, Tennessee, and took part in the movements opposite and above Chattanooga, when it re-crossed the mountains and joined Gen. Thomas at Trenton, Alabama. Meanwhile, on the morning of September 5, the rest of the brigade were themselves tricked when Bragg's forces faked preparations to cross the river to the north side to attack. While Wilder and the other brigade commanders knew by the end of the day that it was a ruse, the reports sent to Rosecrans deceived him into believing Bragg was fleeing in chaos to Dalton or Rome, Georgia.

On September 9, the brigade received orders to cross the river at Friar's Island, two miles downstream from Harrison's Landing, and enter Chattanooga. The river crossing and movement to Chattanooga occupied the 9th and 10th. The 92nd was in the advance to Chattanooga, and participated in driving the rebels from Point Lookout, and entered the rebel stronghold, unfolding the Union banner on the Crutchfield House, and kept in pursuit of the rebels.

=== Ringgold ===
After Rosecrans got his army across the Tennessee River, he lost contact with Bragg's army, and could only assume where he was. He mistakenly thought Bragg was in full flight toward Dalton or Rome. Bragg, however had scouts keeping him informed of Union movements. Since he did not know how close Bragg was, Rosecrans riskily split his army into their corps to quickly move from the river across the mountains south of the Tennessee through several passes. He sent each corps to a separate pass to take. Bragg made two failed attempts to attack Rosecrans in detail between September 9 and 12 that were bungled by his subordinates. Their failure actually helped keep Rosecrans unaware of how vulnerable his dispersion left him.

While Bragg was trying to put together his attacks on Rosecrans's separated forces, Wilder's brigade had been probing southeast ahead of Crittenden's corps. Wilder's brigade took the advance of Crittenden's corps, moving toward Ringgold at dawn 11 September. The 92nd Illinois and a section of mountain howitzers led the movement one mile in advance of the main body of the brigade. Before reaching Ringgold at 13:00, the 92nd ran into 500 troopers of Scott's brigade, Pegram's division, Forrest's Corps of Confederate cavalry, deployed in an L-shaped ambush with the blocking part perpendicular to the Union advance and part the enfilading part along the left side of the road.

The 92nd dismounted and moved forward. Atkins put the Spencer rifle-armed F Company on the left and another Spencer rifle company, E Company, forward as skirmishers. Wilder came forward, sending the 17th Indiana to flank Scott's right, and put a section of Lilly's battery in support. As the brigade prepared for an attack, skirmishers of the 8th Kentucky and 51st Ohio of Brigadier General Horatio Van Cleve's division of Crittenden's corps joined the fight, forcing Scott to pull back to Ringgold, leaving thirteen Confederate dead. Atkins lost six horses and three men wounded, the only casualties sustained by the brigade. The brigade pushed on through Ringgold, where Atkins and the 92nd Illinois departed the brigade.

The 92nd's integration into the brigade was challenging as the transfer occurred during a lull in the action, but not a long enough pause for its complete assimilation. The regiment was behind the rest of the brigade in arming and outfitting, and it was not fully armed with Spencers prior to the battle of Chickamauga. Additionally, Hoover's Gap had been a defining day that had such a team-building effect on Wilder's brigade that the 92nd's joining the brigade after the battle meant some soldiers in the brigade viewed the 92nd as lesser members of the brigade. One wrote that the men of the 92nd lacked "the pride of Indianans" and had to be pulled from their place in column due to their incompetence dealing with guerrillas on the Cumberland Plateau. This criticism, along with Atkins' prior difficulties with the chain of command, is also significant in light of the missions assigned to the 92nd for it would be detached from the brigade three times in the next thirty days.

The 92nd's conduct in their first engagement with the brigade north of Ringgold on 11 September should have erased any worry's about its abilities. It led the brigade's march column, met the enemy and deployed well by all accounts. Atkins demonstrated complete control of the situation, and Wilder called his action a "gallant attack."

=== Chickamauga campaign ===
During the Chickamauga battle, the regiment was again detached from the brigade to secure Dyer and Dry Valley Roads between the Corps and Chattanooga while the rest of the brigade took part in Gen. Reynolds' Division of Gen. Thomas' Corps. The howitzer section of Lilly's Battery was sent with them. The 92nd remained in the rear during the brigade's mauling of the Rebels at Alexander's Bridge on September 18.

While the rest of the brigade had been busy in West Viniard Field stopping McNair's Brigade and Robertson's's Texas Brigade, the 92nd had been brought forward from Pond Springs by Gen. Reynolds to make an attack to assist Colonel Edward King's brigade, which was being overwhelmed in the woods just east of the Brotherton Field. There, the regiment had its hands full slowing down an onslaught of four Confederate regiments of Tennessee and Texas troops up Brotherton Road to Lafayette. King's rattled brigade was already being overwhelmed in the woods just east of the Brotherton Field. The 92nd, with their superior firepower, successfully stopped the Confederates King's brigade had already fallen back, and had taken many of the 92nd's horses in their flight up Dyer Road. Atkins could not find General Reynolds, so he withdrew his men and their remaining horses from the field and moved to link up with Wilder and the rest of the brigade. In their action at the Brotherton Field, Atkins and his men stopped the Rebels but lost twenty-five killed and wounded in addition to losing one of the howitzers.

Later that night, the 92nd rejoined their brigade on its left flank. For the second day in a row, members of the brigade men had helped save the Army of the Cumberland from total disaster: the 92nd at Brotherton Field and the rest of the brigade at Viniard Field.

The brigade spent the night where it fought at the Viniard Field without fires because of the proximity of the Confederate line. During the night a cold front passed over the area, creating a fog in the morning that mixed with the heavy smoke from the battle. During the night, Major General Alexander McCook, commanding XX Corp, ordered Wilder to line a hill a half mile northwest. The hill, running north to south was only a few hundred yards from Rosecrans's headquarters at the Widow Glenn's house, and about a half mile from the Viniard Farm where the brigade fought the day before. At dawn on 20 September the brigade moved to its new position, leaving Colonel Atkins and the 92nd Illinois as a rear guard. The regiment was to fall back to the brigade if pressed by the anticipated attack in the morning. At the notorious moment on the second day of the battle when Wood's division was pulled from the line shortly after 11:00 just as Longstreet's attack hit the Union line, it caught several units moving in column formation and shattered them. Atkins saw the extreme left brigade of the Rebel attack cross the Brock Field towards the Glenn cabin. From his position at the Viniard Field, he mounted his regiment and withdrew towards the rest of the brigade later writing,

At daylight on the 20th was ordered by Colonel Wilder to the right of his brigade. On the withdrawal of his brigade, was ordered to deploy my regiment mounted, and hold the ground he had held until pressed back, when I was to form on the right of Wilder's brigade. Here I remained until about noon, when the enemy had completely flanked my left and were pressing up in front with their skirmishers, when I fell back, passing around a heavy force of the enemy half a mile in rear of my left. I formed three different times in falling back, and faced the enemy, but could not check his advance, and when I fell back to the position assigned on the right of Wilder's brigade it was to find the brigade already moved away.

The 92nd eventually caught up with the brigade on Dry Valley Road where they were consolidating and trying to gather enough horses for the 72nd Indiana to replace those killed or taken by Rebel cavalry, or appropriated by fleeing infantry. They had driven back the attack by Hindman's division on the left of Longstreet's attack column shattering two regiments and taking 47 prisoners. In this effort, they had been joined by the 39th Indiana, another Spencer-armed, mounted regiment from McCook's XX Corps. When the 92nd returned, the brigade and the 39th were organizing their prisoners and regrouping their formation.

After the controversial meeting with Assistant Secretary of War Charles A. Dana, the 92nd and the brigade withdrew from the battlefield down the Dry Valley Road to guard the exodus of the army of the Cumberland from the battlefield. At 16:30, the brigade took a line from McFarland's Gap (through Missionary Ridge) back towards Lookout Mountain to guard Thomas's right flank, keeping the line of retreat open for Thomas' men.

=== Post Chickamauga ===
In April, 1864, it was again at Ringgold, Georgia, performing picket duty. On April 23, Captain Scovil, with twenty-one men, was captured at Nickajack Gap, nine miles from Ringgold, and one man killed. Of the men taken prisoners, twelve were shot down, and six died of wounds, after being taken prisoners. The remainder were taken to Andersonville; very few ever left that place, having died from the cruel treatment received there.

From Ringgold, May 7, 1864, the regiment entered upon the Atlanta campaign and was assigned to Gen. Kilpatrick's command, and participated in the battle of Resaca, raids around Atlanta, and engagements at Bethesda, Fleet River Bridge, and Jonesboro. The regiment lost, at Jonesboro, one-fifth of the men engaged. On October 1, the regiment moved from Mount Gilead Church, west of Atlanta, and took an active part in the operations against Hood's army. At Powder Springs it had a severe engagement, losing a large number of men, killed and wounded. The regiment then returned to Marietta, and participated in the various engagements and skirmishes in Sherman's march to the sea. At Swift Creek, North Carolina, Capt. Hawk, of Co. C, was severely wounded, losing a leg.

November 4, 1864, Kilpatrick's division was re-organized, and the Ninety-second assigned to Atkins' Brigade, and participated in all the cavalry battles on the march through Georgia, and in the capture of Savannah. Attached to General Atkins' brigade, the regiment participated in all the cavalry fighting on Sherman's march through the Carolinas, and against Jo Johnston's rebel army in North Carolina, until the close of the war.

The regiment, during its term of service, was in some forty battles and skirmishes. The regiment was mustered out at Concord, North Carolina, on June 21, 1865, and discharged at Chicago, on July 10, 1865. The regiment's recruits were transferred to the 65th Illinois Volunteer Infantry Regiment on that date.

== Nursing care ==
Addie M. Parsons served in the 92nd Illinois Infantry Regiment. She received permission from the captain of the regiment to travel with them and serve the unit. She went to Cairo, Illinois with the regiment and was set up in the hospital tent. She mended clothing, wrote letters, and worked with physicians and hospital stewards to care for soldiers with typhoid fever, malaria, and other medical issues. She did not receive pay for her work, so the soldiers in the regiment each gave her money until no one soldier received more than she did. Once the regiment moved to the front, she went to Missouri and worked in a hospital in St. Louis and in Benton barracks until the regiment mustered out. Addie M. Parson's name appears with the soldiers on a monument to Company B of the 92nd Illinois Infantry in Byron's public square.

== Total strength and casualties ==
The regiment suffered casualties of 1 officer and 51 enlisted men who were killed in action or who died of their wounds, and 2 officers and 127 enlisted men who died of disease, for a total of 181 fatalities.

== Commanders ==
- Colonel Smith D. Atkins – Mustered out with the regiment.

== Armament/Equipment/Uniform ==
=== Armament ===
The 92nd Illinois was an 1862, three-year regiment, that greatly increased the number of men under arms in the federal army. As with many of these volunteers, initially, there were not enough Model 1861 Springfield Rifles to go around so they were instead issued imported British Pattern 1853 rifles. Initially an infantry unit that served in Brig. Gen. Gordon Granger's Brigade in the Army of Kentucky, they then joined the Army of the Cumberland in time for the Tullahoma campaign. They reported the following on o0rdnance surveys:

- 4th Quarter 1862 Quarterly Ordnance Survey &mdash 755 British Pattern 1853 rifles (.58 and .577 Cal)
- 1st Quarter 1863 Quarterly Ordnance Survey &mdash 649 British Pattern 1853 rifles (.58 and .577 Cal)
- 2nd Quarter 1863 Quarterly Ordnance Survey &mdash 528 British Pattern 1853 rifles (.58 and .577 Cal), 10 non-commissioned officer swords
- 3rd Quarter 1863 Quarterly Ordnance Survey &mdash 274 British Pattern 1853 rifles (.58 and .577 Cal), 7 non-commissioned officer swords
- 4th Quarter 1863 Quarterly Ordnance Survey &mdash 48 British Pattern 1853 rifles (.58 and .577 Cal),(Company I only)

During the Tullahoma campaign, the regiment impressed Wilder such that he arranged for them to join the brigade. During the month of July, mounts were secured for the regiment and on August 1, all surplus Spencer repeating rifles from the May shipment were issued to the regiment so that companies D, E, and F were completely armed with them. The rest of the regiment continued using the Enfields throu8gh the remainder of the 3rd Quarter of 1863. By the 4th Quarter, the regiment was almost completely armed with Spencers save a handful of men in Company I. They reported the following numbers of Spencers in the ordnance surveys:

- 3rd Quarter 1863 Quarterly Ordnance Survey &mdash 186 Spencer rifles (.52 Cal),
- 4th Quarter 1863 Quarterly Ordnance Survey &mdash 513 Spencer rifles (.52 Cal), 5 non-commissioned officer swords
- 4th Quarter 1863 Quarterly Ordnance Survey &mdash 513 Spencer rifles (.52 Cal), 5 non-commissioned officer swords(Company I only)

In October 1863, in an Army of the Cumberland reorganization, the Lightning Brigade was gradually shifted into the cavalry of the army. The 92nd Illinois became an army asset with its companies serving as supply line security and command escorts. As such they ended up exchanging their Spencer rifles for Spencer carbines and Burnside carbines. The reported:

- 3rd Quarter 1864 Quarterly Ordnance Survey &mdash 465 Spencer carbiness (.52 Cal), 107 Burnside carbines (.54 Cal), 2 755 British Pattern 1853 rifles (.58 and .577 Cal), and 1 Springfield Rifled Musket, model 1861 (.58 Cal.)
Issued weapons

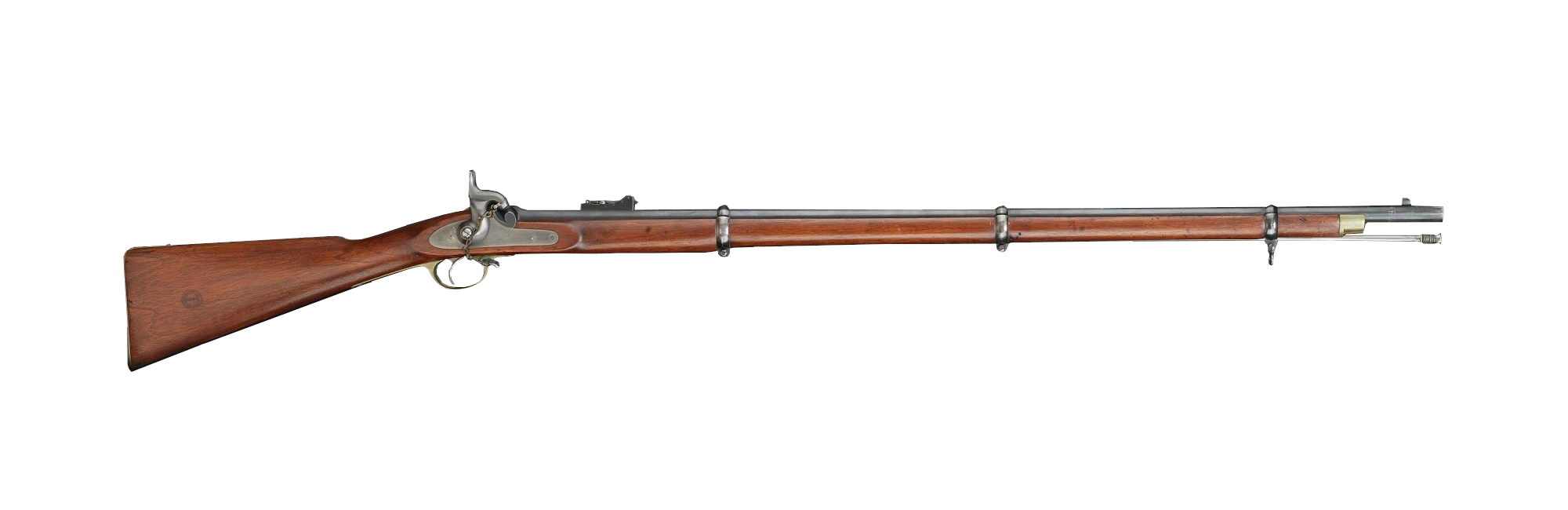
1853 Enfield rifle-musket

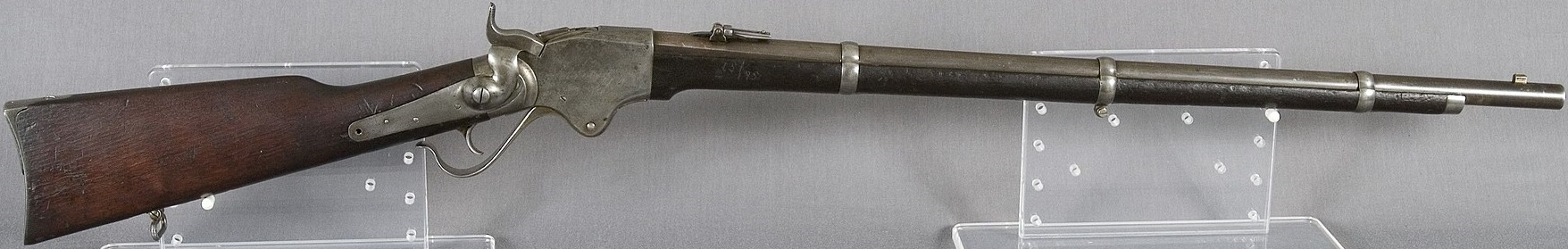
M1862 Spencer rifle

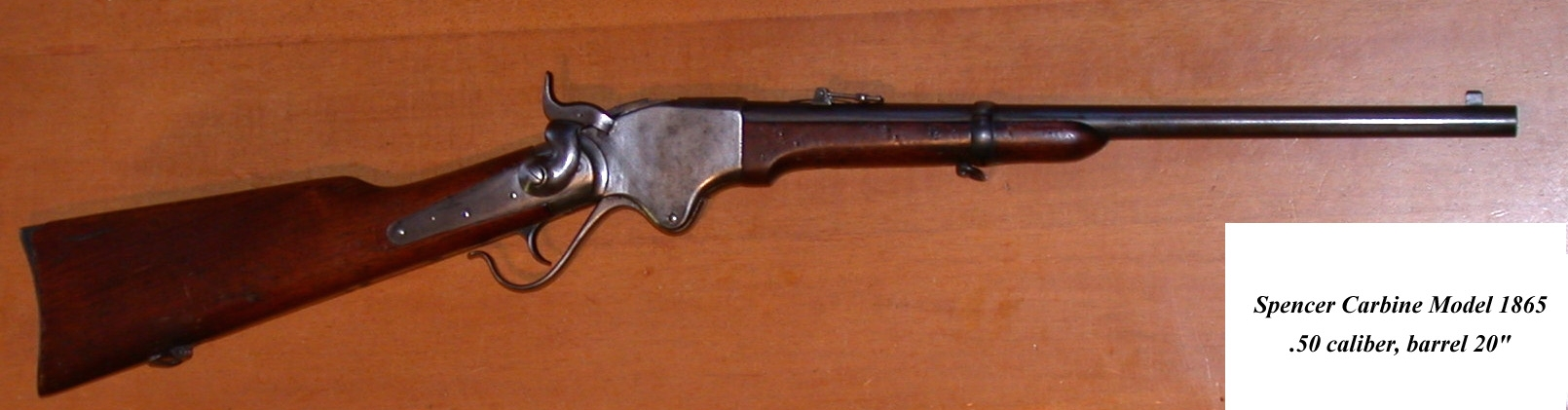
Spencer seven-shot carbine, issued weapon

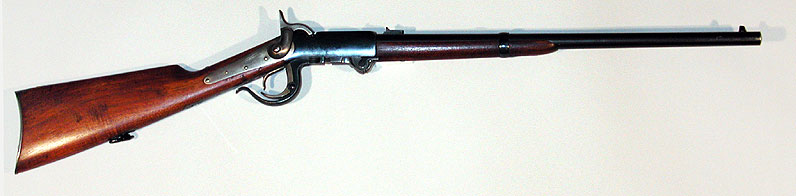
Burnside carbine

=== Equipment ===
When the regiment was first mounted, they used a wide variety of civilian saddles and equipment. On December 5, 1863, they were issued McClellan saddles and standard U.S. Cavalry tack.

=== Uniforms ===
It appears that despite the mounted role, the regiment continued wearing the federally issued sack coat. Some of the men were issued mounted service trousers with a reinforced seat and the yellow cavalry stripe removed. Like most of the western U.S. volunteers, an undecorated 1858 Hardee hat or black civilian slouch hat was the normal headgear.

== See also ==
- List of Illinois Civil War Units
- Illinois in the American Civil War
- Lucius Read House
