= James S. Robinson =

American politician (1827–1892)

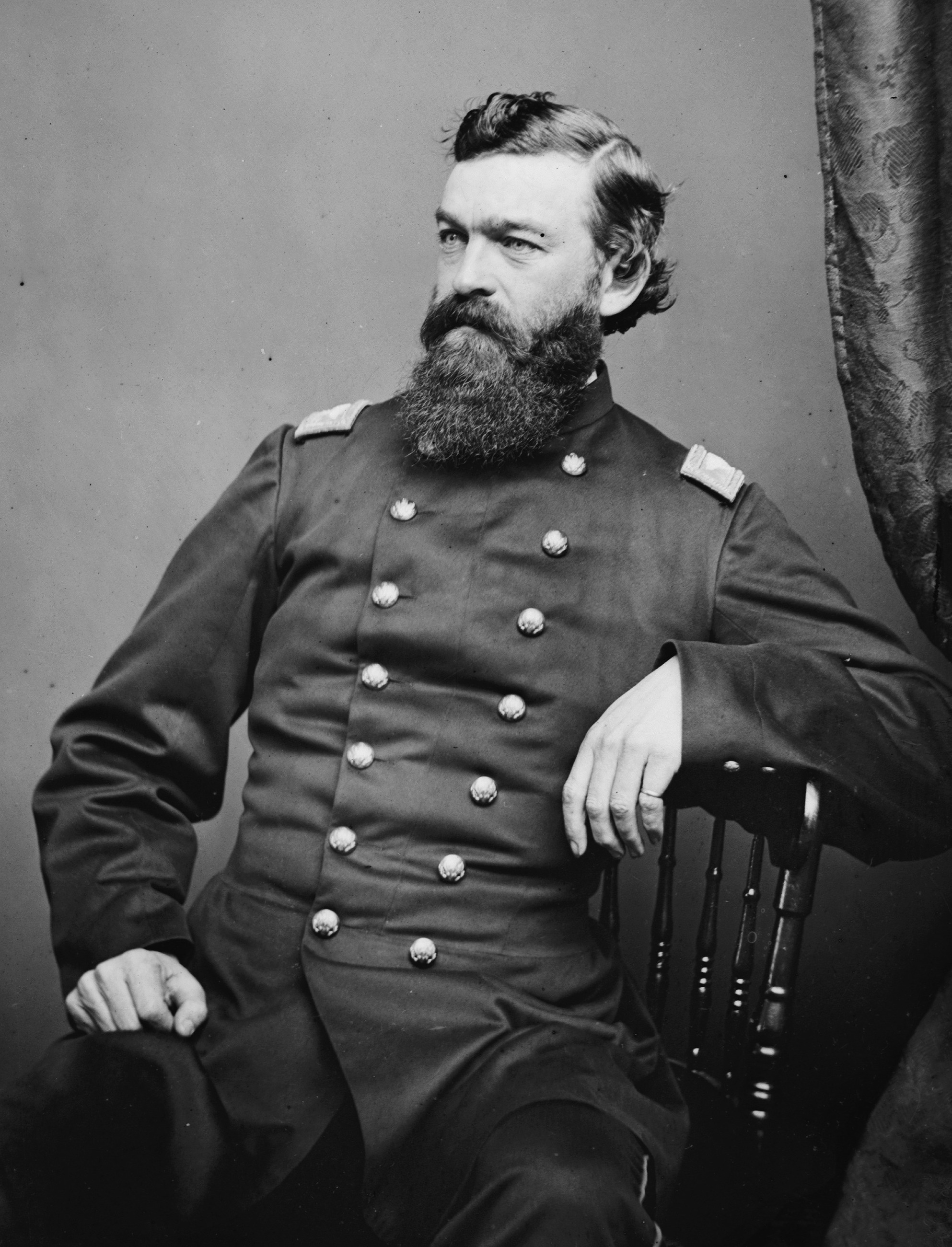
- Robinson, 1860–1870

Member of the U.S. House of Representatives from Ohio's 9th district
- In office March 4, 1881 – January 12, 1885
- Preceded by: George L. Converse
- Succeeded by: William C. Cooper

24th Ohio Secretary of State
- In office January 12, 1885 – January 14, 1889
- Governor: George Hoadly; Joseph B. Foraker
- Preceded by: James W. Newman
- Succeeded by: Daniel J. Ryan

Personal details
- Born: James Sidney Robinson; October 14, 1827 Mansfield, Ohio, U.S.
- Died: January 14, 1892 (aged 64) Kenton, Ohio, U.S.
- Resting place: Grove Cemetery, Kenton, Ohio
- Party: Republican

Military service
- Allegiance: United States of America; Union
- Branch/service: United States Army; Union Army
- Years of service: 1861–1865
- Rank: Brigadier General
- Unit: Army of the Cumberland
- Commands: Robinson's Brigade, XX Corps
- Battles/wars: American Civil War: Battle of Rich Mountain; Second Battle of Bull Run; Battle of Cedar Mountain; Battle of Chancellorsville; Gettysburg campaign; Atlanta campaign; Carolinas campaign

James Sidney Robinson (October 14, 1827 – January 14, 1892) was a U.S. representative from Ohio and a general in the Union Army during the American Civil War. He served two terms in Congress from 1881 to 1885.

== Early life and career ==
Born near Mansfield, Ohio, Robinson attended the common schools. As a young man, he acquired the art of printing. He moved to Kenton, Ohio, on December 31, 1845. Entering the newspaper business, he edited and published the Kenton Republican. He was the Chief Clerk of the Ohio House of Representatives in 1856.

== Civil War service ==
At the beginning of the Civil War, he enlisted in the 4th Ohio Infantry on April 17, 1861, and was soon made a captain. He took part in the operations at Rich Mountain in western Virginia and then was promoted to the rank of major in October 1861. He served under Maj. Gen. John C. Frémont in the Shenandoah Valley, and became a lieutenant colonel in April and colonel of the 82nd Ohio Infantry in August 1862. He was engaged at the Cedar Mountain, the Second Battle of Bull Run, and Chancellorsville in XI Corps.

Robinson was severely wounded in his chest at Gettysburg while leading his retreating troops into the borough on the first day of fighting.

After a lengthy recuperation period, Robinson commanded a brigade under Maj. Gen. Joseph Hooker and then under Maj. Gen. Alpheus S. Williams in XX Corps. He participated in the 1864 Atlanta campaign and later in Sherman's March to the Sea. During the Carolinas campaign, he fought at the Battle of Bentonville. Robinson was commissioned brigadier general of volunteers on January 12, 1865. General Robinson was mustered out of the army on August 31, 1865. On July 9, 1866, President Andrew Johnson nominated Robinson for appointment to the grade of brevet major general of volunteers to rank from March 13, 1865, and the United States Senate confirmed the appointment on July 23, 1866.

== Postbellum career ==
After the war, Robinson returned to Ohio and resumed his civilian career. He served as chairman of the Republican State Executive Committee of Ohio 1877–1879. In January 1880, he was appointed as a commissioner of railroads and telegraphs for the state. Robinson was elected as a Republican to the Forty-seventh and Forty-eighth Congresses and served from March 4, 1881, to January 12, 1885, when he resigned. He then served as the Secretary of State of Ohio from 1885 to 1889.

James S. Robinson died in Kenton, Ohio, on January 14, 1892. He was interred there in Grove Cemetery.

== See also ==
- List of American Civil War generals (Union)
- List of Ohio's American Civil War generals
- Ohio in the American Civil War
- Captain Charles Saalmann (Robinson's Commissary of Subsistence during the Atlanta, Savannah, and Carolinas Campaigns)

== Notes ==
U.S. House of Representatives
Preceded by George L. Converse	United States Representative from Ohio's 9th congressional district 1881–1885	Succeeded by William C. Cooper
Political offices
Preceded by James W. Newman	Secretary of State of Ohio; 1885–1889	Succeeded by Daniel J. Ryan
