= Battle of Bentonville order of battle: Confederate =

The following Confederate States Army units and commanders fought in the Battle of Bentonville of the American Civil War. The Union order of battle is shown separately.

== Army of the South ==
The Army of the South was commanded by General Joseph E. Johnston.

=== Army of Tennessee ===
The Army of Tennessee was commanded by Lieutenant General Alexander P. Stewart.

==== Lee's Corps ====
Major General D. H. Hill commanded Lee's Corps during the Battle of Bentonville.

Unit	Commander	Regiments and others
Stevenson's Division	Major General Carter L. Stevenson	
Palmer's Brigade	Brigadier General Joseph B. Palmer	Tennessee Contingent; 3rd-18th Tennessee; 23rd-26th-45th Tennessee: Col Anderson Searcy; 32nd Tennessee: Ltc John P. McGuire; 58th North Carolina: Cpt George W.F. Harper; 60th North Carolina; 54th Virginia Infantry; 63rd Virginia Infantry
Pettus's Brigade	Brigadier General Edmund W. Pettus (WIA)	20th Alabama; 23rd Alabama; 30th Alabama; 31st Alabama; 46th Alabama
Cumming's Brigade (Arrived on the battlefield March 20)	Colonel Robert J. Henderson	34th Georgia; 36th Georgia; 39th Georgia; 56th Georgia
Clayton's Division	Major General Henry D. Clayton	
Stovall's Brigade	Colonel Henry C. Kellogg	40th Georgia; 41st Georgia; 42nd Georgia: Maj L.P. Thomas; 43rd Georgia; 52nd Georgia
Jackson's Brigade	Lieutenant Colonel Osceola Kyle	1st-66th Georgia; 25th Georgia; 29th-30th Georgia; 1st Georgia Sharpshooter Battalion
Baker's Brigade	Brigadier General Alpheus Baker	22nd Alabama; 37th-40th-42nd Alabama; 54th Alabama
Hill's Division	Colonel John G. Coltart	
Deas's Brigade	Colonel Harry T. Toulmin	19th Alabama; 22nd Alabama; 25th Alabama; 39th Alabama; 50th Alabama
Manigault's Brigade	Lieutenant Colonel John C. Carter	10th South Carolina; 19th South Carolina; 24th Alabama; 28th Alabama; 34th Alabama

==== Stewart's Corps ====
MG William W. Loring (became ill March 20)
MG Edward C. Walthall

Unit	Commander	Regiments and others
Loring's Division	Colonel James Jackson	
Lowry's Brigade	Lieutenant Colonel Robert J. Lawrence	6th Mississippi; 14th Mississippi; 15th Mississippi; 20th Mississippi; 23rd Mississippi; 43rd Mississippi
Scott's Brigade	Captain John A. Dixon	27th-35th-49th Alabama; 55th Alabama; 57th Alabama; 12th Louisiana
Featherston's Brigade	Major Martin A. Oatis	1st Mississippi; 3rd Mississippi; 22nd Mississippi; 31st Mississippi; 33rd Mississippi; 40th Mississippi; 1st Battalion, Mississippi Sharpshooters
Walthall's Division	Major General Edward C. Walthall	
Reynolds's Brigade	Brigadier General Daniel H. Reynolds (WIA); Colonel Henry G. Bunn (WIA); Lieutant Colonel Morton G. Galloway	1st-2nd Arkansas Mounted Rifles (dismounted): Ltc Morton G. Galloway; 4th Arkansas: Col Henry C. Bunn; 9th Arkansas; 25th Arkansas
Quarles's Brigade	Brigadier General George Doherty Johnston	1st Alabama; 25th Alabama; 42nd-46th-49th-53rd-55th Tennessee; 48th Tennessee

==== Cheatham's Corps ====
MG William B. Bate

Unit	Commander	Regiments and others
Cleburne's Division	Brigadier General James A. Smith	
Govan's Brigade	Colonel Peter V. Green	1st-2nd-5th-13th-15th-24th Arkansas; 6th-7th Arkansas; 8th-19th Arkansas
Smith's Brigade	Captain John R. Bonner	1st Georgia (Volunteers); 54th Georgia; 57th Georgia; 63rd Georgia
Granbury's Brigade (Arrived on the battlefield March 20)	Lieutenant Colonel William A. Ryan	5th Confederate; 35th Tennessee; 6th-15th Texas; 7th Texas; 10th Texas; 17th-18th Texas Cavalry (Dismounted); 24th-25th Texas Cavalry (Dismounted); Nutt's Louisiana Cavalry Company (Dismounted)
Lowrey's Brigade (Arrived on the battlefield March 21)	Lieutenant Colonel John F. Smith	5th Regiment-3rd Battalion Mississippi; 8th-32nd Mississippi; 16th-33rd-45th Alabama
Bate's Division	Colonel D. L. Kenan (WIA)	
Tyler's Brigade	Major William H. Wilkinson †	37th Georgia; 4th Georgia Battalion Sharpshooters; 2nd-10th-20th Tennessee
Finley's Brigade	Lieutenant Colonel Edward Mashburn	1st-3rd Florida; 4th Florida Infantry-1st Florida Cavalry (dismounted); 6th-7th Florida
Brown's Division	Brigadier General Roswell S. Ripley (Arrived on the battlefield March 21)	
Gist's Brigade	Colonel Hume R. Field	6th Georgia-8th Georgia Battalion; 46th Georgia; 65th Georgia; 2nd Georgia Sharpshooters Battalion; 16th South Carolina; 24th South Carolina
Maney's Brigade	Lieutenant Colonel Christopher C. McKinney	4th Confederate-6th-9th-50th Tennessee; 1st-27th Tennessee; 8th-16th-28th Tennessee
Strahl's Brigade	Colonel James D. Tillman	4th-5th-31st-33rd-38th Tennessee; 19th-24th-41st Tennessee
Vaughan's Brigade	Colonel William P. Bishop	11th-29th Tennessee; 12th-47th Tennessee; 13th-51st-52nd-154th Tennessee

=== Department of North Carolina ===
Gen Braxton Bragg

Unit	Commander	Regiments and others
Hoke's Division	Major General Robert F. Hoke	
Clingman's Brigade	Colonel William S. Devane (WIA)	8th North Carolina; 31st North Carolina; 51st North Carolina; 61st North Carolina: Ltc Edward Beatty Mallett †
Kirkland's Brigade	Brigadier General William W. Kirkland	17th North Carolina; 42nd North Carolina; 66th North Carolina
Hagood's Brigade	Brigadier General Johnson Hagood	3rd Regiment, North Carolina Artillery (6 companies); Contingent of Lt. Col. James H. Rion: 11th South Carolina; 21st South Carolina; 25th South Carolina; 27th South Carolina; 7th South Carolina Battalion; Contingent of Lt. Col. John D. Taylor (WIA): 2nd Regiment-1st Battalion North Carolina Artillery; Adams's Battery (Company D, 13th Battalion, North Carolina Light Artillery); Contingent of Maj. William A. Holland: 40th North Carolina
Colquitt's Brigade	Colonel Charles T. Zachary	6th Georgia; 19th Georgia; 23rd Georgia; 27th Georgia; 28th Georgia
North Carolina Junior Reserves Brigade	Colonel John H. Nethercutt	1st North Carolina Junior Reserves: Col Charles W. Broadfoot; 2nd North Carolina Junior Reserves; 3rd North Carolina Junior Reserves; 20th North Carolina Battalion, Junior Reserves
Artillery	Lieutenant Colonel Joseph B. Starr	1st North Carolina Artillery (1 company); 13th Battalion North Carolina Light Artillery (3 companies); Company B (Atkins' Battery): Cpt George Atkins; Company E: (Dickson's Battery); 3rd Battalion North Carolina Light Artillery (3 companies); Company A: Cpt Andrew J. Ellis; Company B: Cpt William Badham, Jr.; Company C: Lt Alfred Darden; Chesterfield (South Carolina) Artillery

=== Department of South Carolina, Georgia, & Florida ===
LTG William J. Hardee

- Chief of Staff: Ltc T. Benton Roy
- Engineer: Ltc William D. Pickett

Unit	Commander	Regiments and others
Taliaferro's Division	Brigadier General William B. Taliaferro	
Elliott's Brigade	Brigadier General Stephen Elliott, Jr. (WIA)	22nd Georgia Heavy Artillery Battalion; 28th Georgia Artillery Battalion; 2nd South Carolina Heavy Artillery; 19th South Carolina Militia
Rhett's Brigade	Colonel William Butler	1st South Carolina Regulars; 1st South Carolina Heavy Artillery; 15th South Carolina Battalion
McLaws's Division	Major General Lafayette McLaws	
Conner's Brigade	Brigadier General John D. Kennedy	2nd South Carolina; 3rd South Carolina; 7th South Carolina; 8th South Carolina; 15th South Carolina; 20th South Carolina; 3rd South Carolina Battalion
Fiser's Brigade	Colonel John C. Fiser	1st Georgia Regulars: Col Richard A. Wayne; 2nd Georgia Reserve; 27th Georgia Battalion-Cobb Guards
Harrison's Brigade	Colonel George P. Harrison Jr.	5th Georgia; 32nd Georgia; 47th Georgia
Hardy's Brigade	Colonel Washington Hardy	50th North Carolina: Col George W. Wortham; 77th North Carolina (7th Senior Reserves); 10th North Carolina Battalion, Heavy Artillery
Blanchard's Brigade	Brigadier General Albert G. Blanchard	1st South Carolina Reserve Battalion; 2nd South Carolina Reserve Battalion; 6th South Carolina Reserve Battalion; 7th South Carolina Reserve Battalion; Kay's Company, South Carolina Reserve
Battalion Artillery	Major A. Burnet Rhett	LeGardeur's Battery; H. M. Stuart's Battery (Beaufort Light Artillery)

=== Cavalry Command ===
LTG Wade Hampton III

Unit	Commander	Regiments and others
Butler's Division	Major General M. C. Butler (WIA) Brigadier General Evander M. Law	
Young's Brigade	Colonel Gilbert J. Wright	7th Georgia; 10th Georgia; 20th Georgia Battalion-Jeff. Davis (Mississippi) Legion; Cobb's (Georgia) Legion; Phillips's (Georgia) Legion
Butler's Brigade	Brigadier General Evander M. Law; Brigadier General Thomas M. Logan	4th South Carolina; 5th South Carolina; 6th South Carolina
Horse Artillery	Captain William E. Earle; Captain Edwin L. Halsey	Earle's South Carolina Battery; Hart's (Halsey's) South Carolina Battery

==== Wheeler's Cavalry Corps ====
MG Joseph Wheeler
(Army of Tennessee)

Unit	Commander	Regiments and others
Humes' Division	Colonel Henry M. Ashby	
T. Harrison's Brigade	Colonel Baxter Smith	3rd Arkansas; 4th Tennessee; 8th Texas: Ltc Gustave Cook (WIA), Maj William R. Jarmon (WIA), Cpt John F. Matthews; 11th Texas
Ashby's Brigade	Lieutenant Colonel James H. Lewis	1st Tennessee; 2nd Tennessee; 5th Tennessee; 9th Tennessee
Allen's Division	Brigadier General William W. Allen	
Hagan's Brigade	Colonel David G. White	1st Alabama; 3rd Alabama; 51st Alabama
Anderson's Brigade	Brigadier General Robert H. Anderson	3rd Confederate; 8th Confederate; 10th Confederate; 5th Georgia
Dibrell's Division	Brigadier General George G. Dibrell	
Dibrell's Brigade	Colonel William S. McLemore	4th Tennessee (Murrey's); 13th Tennessee; Shaw's Tennessee Battalion (includes Allison's Tennessee Squadron)
Breckinridge's Brigade	Colonel W. C. P. Breckinridge	1st (3rd) Kentucky; 2nd Kentucky; 9th Kentucky

== Sources ==
- Bentonville State Historic Site website
- Bradley, Mark L. Last Stand in the Carolinas: The Battle of Bentonville. Campbell, California: Savas Publishing Company, 1996. ISBN 1-882810-02-3.
- Hughes, Jr., Nathaniel Cheairs Bentonville: The Final Battle of Sherman and Johnston. Chapel Hill, N.C.: University of North Carolina Press, 1996.
