= 17th Iowa Infantry Regiment =

- Iowa state flag
- Active: March 21, 1862, to July 25, 1865
- Country: United States
- Allegiance: Union
- Branch: Infantry
- Engagements: Battle of Shiloh; Battle of Corinth; Battle of Port Gibson; Battle of Raymond; Battle of Champion Hill; Battle of Big Black River Bridge; Siege of Vicksburg; Battle of Kennesaw Mountain; Battle of Atlanta; Battle of Jonesboro; Sherman's March to the Sea

The 17th Iowa Infantry Regiment was an infantry regiment that served in the Union Army during the American Civil War.

== Service ==
The 17th Iowa Infantry was organized at Keokuk, Iowa, and mustered in for three years of Federal service on April 16, 1862.

The regiment was mustered out on July 25, 1865.

== Total strength and casualties ==
The 17th Iowa mustered 958 men at the time it left Iowa for active campaigning. It suffered 5 officers and 66 enlisted men who were killed in action or who died of their wounds and 2 officers and 121 enlisted men who died of disease, for a total of 194 fatalities.

== Commanders ==
- Colonel John W. Rankin
- Colonel David Burke Hillis
- Lieutenant Colonel Simpson (a.k.a. Sampson, Samson) M. Archer
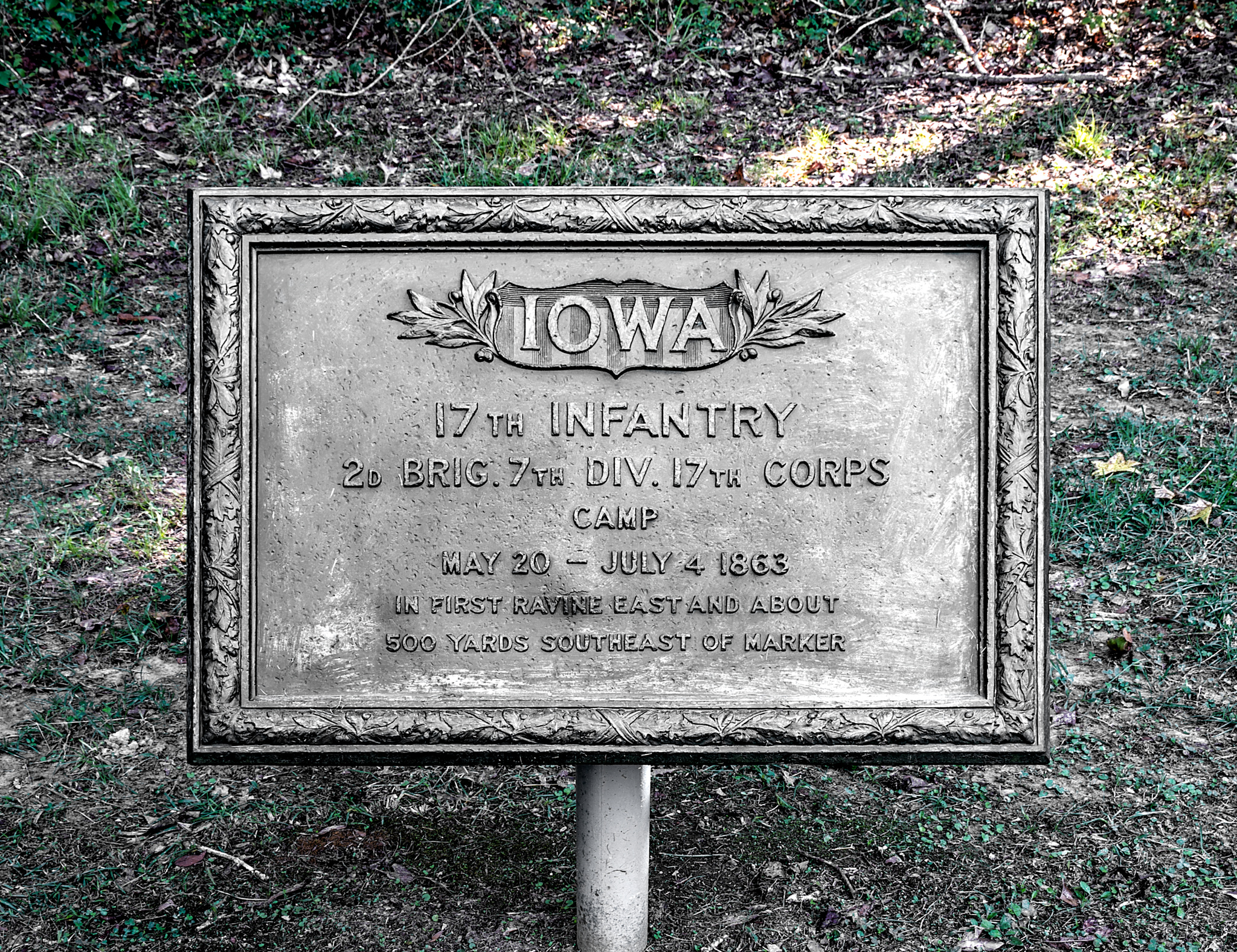
Unit position marker at Vicksburg National Military Park

== See also ==
- List of Iowa Civil War Units
- Iowa in the American Civil War
