= Camp Merritt =

Camp Merritt may refer to:

- Camp Merritt, New Jersey, a U.S. military camp in eastern Bergen County, New Jersey, more specifically in modern-day Cresskill, NJ, that was activated for use in World War I.
- Camp Merritt, California, a Spanish–American War era American military camp used to hold 18,000 American troops awaiting transportation to the Philippines
- Camp Merritt (Montana), see Department of Dakota
- Camp Merritt Lamb, a camp of the El Paso Council of the Boy Scouts
- Camp Merritt (Michigan), a camp of the Muskegon Area Council of the Boy Scouts
