= Camp Poplar River =

Coordinates: 48°06′47″N 105°11′52″W

- Poplar, Montana
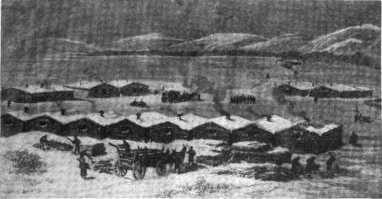
- Cantonment at Poplar River, with the agency in the background. From a sketch made by H.O.S. Heistand U.S. Army

Site information
- Controlled by: United States

Site history
- Built: 1880
- In use: 1880-1893
- Battles/wars: Indian Wars

Garrison information
- Past commanders: Captain Ogden B. Read, 11th Infantry; Captain Charles Steelhammer, 15th Infantry; Captain Wilson T. Hartz, 15th Infantry; Captain Lloyd Wheaton, 20th Infantry
- Garrison: 11th U.S. Infantry, Companies B and F; 15th U.S. Infantry, Companies G and K; 20th U.S. Infantry, Companies G and I

Camp Poplar River was established during the Indian wars in the Department of Dakota by U.S. Army to maintain order, keep non-agency Indians away, and help capture the Indians who disturbed the peace and would not conform to reservation boundaries of the Fort Peck Agency, which in 1878, was relocated to its present-day location in Poplar because the original agency was located on a flood plain, suffering floods each spring. The post was located one-half mile north of the then called, Poplar River Agency, or 2 miles north of the Missouri River on the south bank of the Poplar River and normally consisted of only two companies of infantry. This tiny post has disappeared except for the fact that the town of Poplar, Montana, on the site, bears the same name.

== 11th Infantry ==
September, 1880, Companies B and F, Eleventh Infantry, changed station from Fort Custer to Poplar Creek Agency, under orders to establish a cantonment at that point.

October 12, 1880, Camp Poplar River, Mont., established, Companies B and F, Eleventh Infantry, from Fort Custer, arriving this day and taking station.

December 15, 1880, in compliance with telegraphic instructions from department headquarters, dated December 12, 1880, Companies A, B, C, F, and G, Fifth Infantry, and 6 enlisted Indian scouts, under command of Maj. Guido Ilges, Fifth Infantry, left Fort Keogh, en route to Camp Poplar River, Mont., to take temporary station there, for the purpose of strengthening the garrison at that post owing to the threatening attitude of hostile Indians in that vicinity; arrived there December 24, 1880. Distance estimated at from 135 to 175 miles.

December 23, 1880, Troop A, Second Cavalry, left Fort Keogh, Mont. and proceeded en route to Camp Poplar River, Mont., as escort, with rations and forage for the latter place. Camped at Ferry Point, Mont., December 31, 1880. Distance marched, about 60 miles.

January 1, 1881, Troop A, Second Cavalry, escorting public stores from Fort Keogh to Camp Poplar River, Mont., left camp at Ferry Point and arrived at its destination January 19, 1881. Total distance marched, about 135 miles.

January 2, 1881, Maj. Guido Ilges, Fifth Infantry, with Companies A, B, C, F, and G, Fifth Infantry, Troop F, Seventh Cavalry, and detachment Seventh Infantry, marched from Camp Poplar River, Mont., against a band of hostile Indians encamped about two miles to the southeast of the latter post, on the south bank of the Missouri River, and after an engagement, in which 8 of the hostiles were killed, compelled their surrender, capturing 303 Indians, about 200 ponies, 69 guns, and burning 60 of their lodges.

The infantry battalion, composed of Company F, 11th Infantry, and detachments of Companies A, B and E, 7th Infantry, and one three-inch gun, all under command of Captain Ogden B. Read, 11th Infantry, left the agency at 11.30 A. M., marched three miles, crossed the Missouri River, took and held a point of timber commanding the lower village of the Indians until joined by Major Ilges with the main command. The attack commenced at once, and after an engagement of about one hour, during which Company F was engaged in firing upon and turning back Indians attempting to escape from the artillery fire, resulted in the capturing of three Indian villages and their destruction. 324 prisoners were taken, with about 300 ponies and a large number of arms. No casualties among the troops.

On the 6th of January these Indians, together with 102 ponies, were sent from Camp Poplar River under guard (Troop F, Seventh Cavalry) to Fort Buford, arriving there January 10, 1881.

January 3, 1881, Major Ilges, Fifth Infantry, with James M. Bell, Troop F, Seventh Cavalry, and battalion Fifth Infantry, left Camp Poplar River and proceeded towards the camp of the Yanktonnai, on the Red Water, to compel the surrender of hostile Indians who fled to that camp after the capture of their village on the 2d instant. When about 7 miles on the way, Major Ilges was met by the Yankton chiefs, who promised that, if he would not take his command to their camp, the hostiles should surrender the next day. This was done. Distance marched, 14 miles.

January 8, 1881, Captain Samuel Ovenshine, Fifth Infantry, with Companies A and G, Fifth Infantry, left Camp Poplar River to scout up the Missouri River for hostiles reported in that locality. No Indians were seen and the command returned same day. Distance marched, 30 miles.

January 9, 1881, Lieutenant Thomas W. Woodruff, Fifth Infantry, with detachment Fifth Infantry, left Camp Poplar River to scout in an easterly direction, to search for and bring in a party of hostiles reported to be hidden in that direction. Returned same day with 18 hostiles captured. Distance traveled, 18 miles. These Indians, with 6 others who had, meanwhile, been arrested by Major Ilges, were forwarded January 11, under charge of Captain Thomas B. Dewees and his troop A, Second Cavalry, to Fort Buford arriving January 15, the troop returning to Camp Poplar River January 24.

January 23, 1881, Capt. Simon Snyder, Fifth Infantry, with Company F, Fifth Infantry, with all available transportation, left Camp Poplar River for Wolf Point to assist a band of Indians under Crow King numbering about 300 (who had refused to go with Sitting Bull to Canada), on their journey to Fort Buford. Captain Snyder with his company returned to Camp Poplar River January 31, 1881.

January 27, 1881, First Lieutenant Charles A. Booth, Seventh Infantry, left Camp Poplar River with detachment of Companies A, B, and E, Seventh Infantry, which had formed part of Major Ilges' command at that post. Arrived at Fort Buford January 30.

February 1, 1881, Troop A, Second Cavalry, left Camp Poplar River for Fort Buford with 53 Indian prisoners of war. Arrived February 4. Left Fort Buford February 10 and arrived at Fort Keogh February 19, 1881. Total distance marched, 230 miles.

February 1, 1881, Capt. O. B. Read, Eleventh Infantry, with detachment of Companies B and F, Eleventh Infantry, left Camp Poplar River as escort to 325 hostile Sioux Indians, under charge of Scout Allison, en route to surrender at Fort Buford. Arrived February 5. Indians surrendered February (with 150 ponies and 40 guns and pistols. Captain Read with his detachment left Fort Buford February 6 and arrived at Camp Poplar River February 8, 1881. Distance marched, 120 miles.

July 25, 1881, Companies D and K, Fifth Infantry, Captain McDonald, commanding, left Fort Keogh, Mont., for Camp Poplar River, to remove intruders from reservation under charge of agent Porter. Returned to Fort Keogh September 20, 1881.

August 8, 1881, Second Lieutenant Greene, Seventh Infantry, with a small detachment, left Fort Buford, Dak., to stake out a telegraph line between Fort Buford and Camp Poplar River, Mont.

August 12, 1881, Second Lieutenant Wheeler, Eleventh Infantry, and detachment Company C, Eleventh Infantry, left Fort Custer, Mont., for guard duty at Terry's Landing, Mont.

August 12, 1881, Company H, Eleventh Infantry, First Lieutenant Mansfield, Eleventh Infantry, commanding, left Fort Custer for Fort Maginnis to assist in the construction of a telegraph line from that post to Camp Poplar River, Mont. Arrived at Fort Maginnis August 23.

August 10, 1881, Company F, Eighteenth Infantry, Captain Lloyd commanding, left Fort Assinniboine, Mont., for Summer Camp at Rocky Point, Mont., to aid in the construction of a telegraph hue between Camp Poplar River, Mont., and Fort Maginnis, Mont.

August 18, 1881, First Lieutenant Kingsbury, Second Cavalry, with a detachment of 20 enlisted men of Troop B, Second Cavalry, left Fort Maginnis, Mont., to select a route for a telegraph line between Rocky Point and Camp Poplar River, Mont. Returned to Fort Maginnis about September 15, after examining the route on both sides of the Missouri River.

August 24, 1881, Sergeant Neeland, with 10 men of the garrison at Camp Poplar River, left that post to work on telegraph line between Camp Poplar River and Fort Buford, Dak.

September 10, 1881, United States military telegraph line completed from Fort Buford to Camp Poplar River. The line from Fort Maginnis to Summer Camp at Rocky Point now under construction.

March 6, 1882, Capt. O. B. Read, Eleventh Infantry, accompanied by one Indian scout, left Camp Poplar River for the half-breed camp on Milk River, for the purpose of effecting the release of Sheriff J. J. Healy and party, held as prisoners by half-breeds. The main camp, about 100 miles from Camp Poplar River, was reached March 8, where Mr. Healy and three assistants were found, under close guard. The prisoners were released upon demand of Captain Read, and their property restored to them excepting two shot-guns which could not be found. Captain Read then started to return to his station, but during the night was informed that further violence was being used against Sheriff Healy and his party. Upon his return to the cabin which the prisoners occupied, a party of thirty or forty half-breeds, under the influence of liquor, and some of them armed, made their appearance with carts to carry away by force the property which Sheriff Healy had seized. Captain Read succeeded in preventing bloodshed, and remained until an agreement was entered into between Sheriff Healy and the half-breeds regarding the property carried away. Sheriff Healy's horses were restored to him and he then left for Benton with his party. Captain Read returned to his station March 11, 1882.

July 28, 1882, telegraph connection was made with Fort Maginnis via Camp Poplar River, Wolf Point, Willow Creek, crossing Missouri River at Hawley Bend, thence to Rocky Point (all on Missouri River), and Fort Maginnis. First Lieut. C. A. Booth, Seventh Infantry, in charge of the construction party working west from Camp Poplar River, built 108 miles of the line; and First Lieut. F. W. Kingsbury, Second Cavalry, in charge of the party working east from Rocky Point, crossing the wire over the Missouri River, built 70 miles.

December 2, 1882, First Sergeant Neeland, Company B, with Sergeant Bobst, Company F, Eleventh Infantry, and a detachment of Indian scouts, from Camp Poplar River, struck a camp of foreign halfbreeds and Crees near Campbell's houses on Milk River. The halfbreeds and Indians fled with their ponies, leaving in Sergeant Neeland's hands 58 carts and harness, 20 hides, and 10,000 pounds of meat.

December 21, 1882, Capt. O. B. Read, Eleventh Infantry, with two non commissioned officers and one Indian scout, left Camp Poplar River for Fort Peck Indian Reservation to assist the Indian agent in removing intruders, it having been reported that white hunters, as well as half-breeds and Cree Indians, were hunting in large numbers on the Indian reservation. Seventeen white intruders were found and ordered to leave. No half-breeds or Indians were seen. The party returned to its post, December 31, 1882. Distance marched about 280 miles.

January 10, 1883, Capt. O. B. Read, Eleventh Infantry, with a detachment of twenty-three picked men from his command and four Indian scouts, left Camp Poplar River to remove intruders from Fort Peck Indian Reservation. January 14, about 2 miles from Willow Creek, the detachment met two men with a wagon loaded with sixty-one hides, who claimed to have been hired by hunters to haul in their load; the hides were destroyed, their arms and ammunition were seized, and the men were ordered to leave the reservation. A cache of twenty-three hides was found the same day and destroyed. January 18, four white hunters were arrested, their property seized and destroyed. They were examined by a United States commissioner and committed for trial. No half-breeds or Canadian Indians were seen, except two Uncpapas met by Sergeant Herbert near the line, who were disarmed and allowed to go. The detachment returned to its post January 24. Distance marched about 300 miles. Very severe weather was experienced by the party; the mean temperature for the fourteen days being —12.25 degrees, and the lowest during the time —55 degrees.

March 1, 1883, Scout Culbertson, from Camp Poplar River, captured and disarmed nine lodges of Cree Indians, near Timber Creek. The chief of this camp reports they are part of the thirty lodges of Crees ordered away from Big Bend of Milk River about two weeks before by a detachment from Fort Assinniboine. Two bodies of white men, frozen to death, were found 25 miles from Timber Creek. The arms and ponies were returned to the Indians, and they were ordered to cross the line.

November 24, 1883, a small band of hostile Sioux Indians (nine men and twenty-four women and children in the party) surrendered to the commanding officer of Camp Poplar River, Mont., and turned in eleven ponies and three guns. They reported fifty lodges still out.

January 14, 1884, the commanding officer at Camp Poplar River reported the Indians at Poplar River Agency in want of food and those at Wolf Point still more destitute.

March 13, 1884, at Camp Poplar River, one set of officers quarters and one building, used as offices of the commanding officer, the adjutant, and the telegraph operator, were destroyed by fire.

June 16, 1884, Companies B and F, Eleventh Infantry, left Camp Poplar River, Mont., for Fort Abraham Lincoln, Dak., on steamer Helena, arriving June 18.

== 15th Infantry ==
June 7, 1884, Companies G and K, Fifteenth Infantry, under command of Captain Steelhammer, left Fort A. Lincoln, Dak., for Camp Poplar River, Mont., arriving there June 10. Total distance traveled by steamer, 399 miles.

Captain Wilson Tweed Hartz in command of Camp Poplar River, Mont., from July, 1884, to September, 1886.

August 25, 1884, the commanding officer, Camp Poplar River, Mont., was notified by Mr. S. E. Snider, Indian agent, that forty-one Indians (some of them armed) had come into the agency corral at Polar Creek Agency and commenced to carry off beef, &c.; that they were insubordinate and refused to surrender their arms; that his police were insufficient for the emergency, and he requested the commanding officer to furnish sufficient men to disarm the Indians and restore order. First Lieut. W. O. Cory, with twenty enlisted men of the Fifteenth Infantry, proceeded to the Indian agency, with orders from the commanding officer, Camp Poplar River, to act as a guard and prevent depredations, but to avoid a conflict if possible. The Indians soon quietly dispersed to their camps, and later ten of the disaffected ones gave up their arms to the post commander.

September 17, 1884, at Camp Poplar River, Moat., a building used as a carpenter's shop, granary, and saddler's shop was destroyed by fire. It was evident from the character of the fire that it had been kindled by an incendiary.

== 20th Infantry ==
In August, 1886, Company G, Twentieth Infantry changed station from Fort Maginnis to Camp Poplar River, Mont., by marching about fifty miles to the Missouri River (Rocky Point), thence by boat; and in the same month, Company I changed station from Fort Assiniboine to Camp Poplar River, marching to Claggett (60 miles), thence by boat to its station.

On October 16, 1889, Company F, Twentieth Infantry, changed station from Fort Assiniboine to Camp Poplar River, Montana; and Company G, on the 17th, left Camp Poplar River for Fort Assiniboine, taking station there October 18, both movements by rail.

Companies I and K, Twentieth Infantry, were skeletonized under General Orders No. 76, A. G. O. series of 1890, the officers transferred to other companies from which officers were absent on extended tours of detached service, or long leave of absence, and the enlisted men distributed among the remaining companies of the regiment. By the disbandment of Company I at Camp Poplar River, that garrison was reduced to one company, and on the 18th of September Company C, under orders of the Department commander, left Fort Buford and marched to Camp Poplar River, 63 miles, taking station there September 21, 1890.

In the summer following, Company I, Twentieth Infantry, was reëstablished, as an Indian company, under War Department Orders of March 9, 1891, and assigned to station at Camp Poplar River. Enlistments of Indians for this company were made from the Sioux at the Poplar River, and Gros Ventres and Assiniboines at the Fort Belknap Agency, and, when the number necessary for its organization seemed assured Company F was ordered from Camp Poplar River to Fort Buford, and, proceeding by rail, took station there May 21, 1891.

The regiment is now, March, 1893, stationed in the Department of Dakota, the Headquarters, Band, and Companies A, B, D, F, F, G and H, at Fort Assiniboine, Montana, commanded by Lieut.-Colonel Evan Miles, 20th Infantry. Companies C and I at Camp Poplar River, Mont., commanded by Major Lloyd Wheaton, 20th Infantry.

General Orders No. 55.) Headquarters of the Army Adjutant General's Office, Washington, July 3, 1893.

The following, on the recommendation of the Major General Commanding the Army, having been approved by the Secretary of War, is published for the information of all concerned: The garrison of Camp Poplar River, Montana, will be withdrawn, and the post abandoned. Company C, 20th Infantry, stationed at that point will be sent to Fort Buford, and Company I, 20th Infantry (Indian), to Fort Assinniboine.

The department commander will give the necessary orders to carry these changes into effect as soon as it can be done with due regard to economy. He will report by telegraph to the Adjutant General of the Army the date when the troops shall have been withdrawn, that the necessary arrangements may be made for the restoration of the land occupied by the post to the Indian Bureau of the Interior Department. Upon the withdrawal of the garrison a schedule will be forwarded to this office showing in detail the description and condition of the public buildings and improvements left on the ground, together with an approximate estimate of the value of each, to be accompanied by a report showing what, if any, of these buildings, or parts of them, can be removed and used to advantage at other military posts or stations.

By Command Of Major General Schofield.

R. WILLIAMS, Adjutant General.

== See also ==
- Department of Dakota Forts
- List of military installations in Montana
