= Fort Carroll (Montana) =

Historic trading post in Montana, USA

- Fergus County, Montana, near Zortman, Montana

Site information
- Type: Steamboat landing post
- Owner: U.S. Fish and Wildlife Service

Site history
- Built: 1874
- Built by: Diamond R Transportation Company
- Demolished: 1882 (abandoned)

Garrison information
- Garrison: 7th U. S. Infantry

Fort Carroll, also Carroll Landing Post was a trading post and steamboat landing established in 1874 on the Missouri River in present-day Fergus County, Montana. Garrisoned by 7th U.S. Infantry in the summers of 1874 and 1875, the town of Carroll also sprung up at the landing. Both the town and fort were abandoned in 1882.

== History ==
Built by the Diamond R Transportation Company as a trading post and steamboat landing on the Missouri River to replace Fort Sheridan and challenge Fort Benton as a transportation and supply center. Fort Carroll was garrisoned by the 7th U.S. Infantry during the summers of 1874 and 1875, then abandoned in 1882 when business diminished.

== Location ==
Fort Carroll is located along the Missouri River in present-day Fergus County, Montana, 24.9 miles (40.1 km) south of the unincorporated community of Zortman. The ghost town of Valentine, Montana is also nearby.

== See also ==
- List of military installations in Montana
