= 11th Infantry Regiment (United States) =

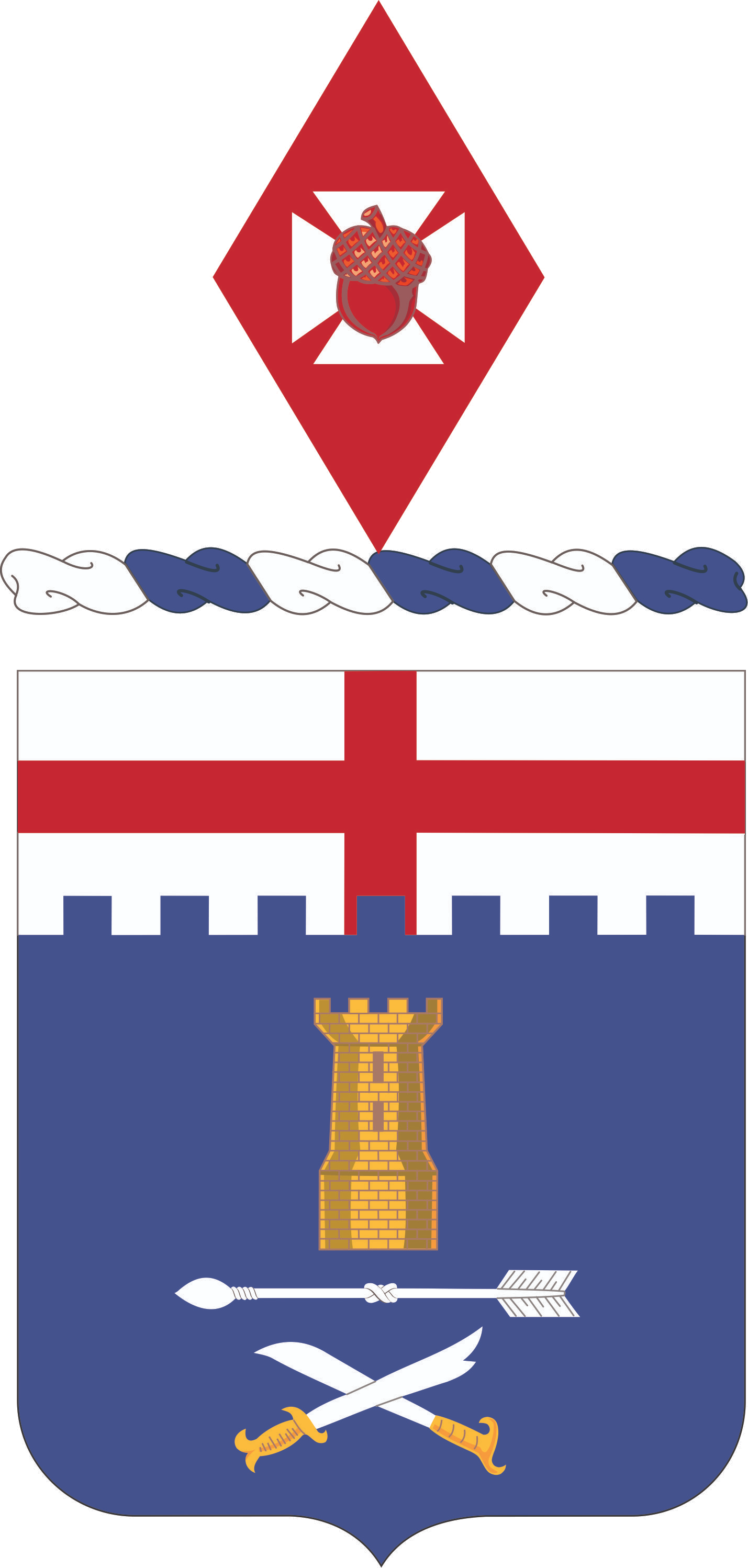
- Coat of arms
- Active: 1799-present
- Country: United States
- Branch: United States Army
- Type: Infantry
- Role: Training regiment
- Part of: U.S. Army Regimental System
- Garrison/HQ: Fort Benning
- Nickname: "Wandering 11th"
- Motto: Semper fidelis
- Engagements: American Civil War; Indian Wars; War with Spain; World War I World War II; Vietnam War

Insignia
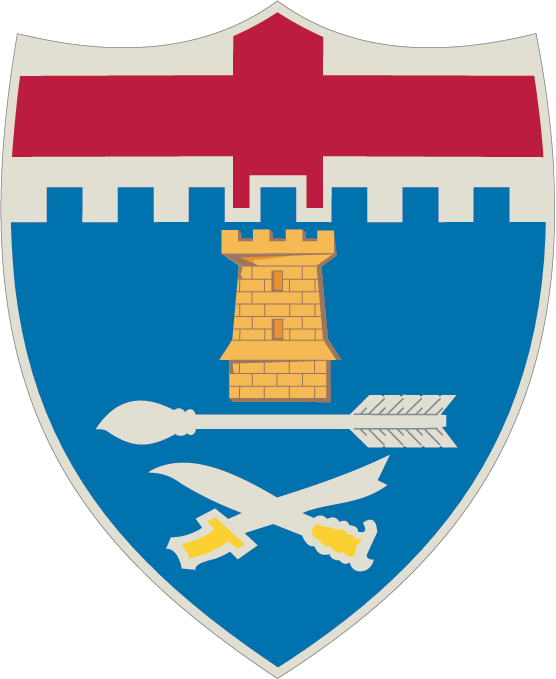
- Distinctive unit insignia

The 11th Infantry Regiment is a regiment in the United States Army. In 2007, the 11th Infantry was reflagged as the 199th Infantry Brigade, as part of the "Transformation of the US Army" effort. Today, the 11th Infantry Regiment is part of the Army's regimental system and is the primary regiment to which many Infantry School units are aligned.

== Earlier units called "11th Infantry Regiment" ==
=== The first 11th Infantry ===
Under the authority granted the President by the Act of 16 July 1798, to raise twelve additional regiments of infantry, the first 11th Infantry came into existence in the Army of the United States in January 1799, with Aaron Ogden as Lieutenant Colonel Commandant. It was raised for the "Quasi-War" with France but saw no war service. The Act of 20 February 1800, suspended enlistments for the new regiments. The Act of 14 May 1800, authorized the president to discharge them, and under this authority the 11th Infantry was disbanded 15 June 1800.

=== War of 1812 ===
The second 11th U.S. regiment of infantry was organized on 11 January 1812 when the Congress authorized a strengthening of the Regular Army in preparation for the threatening conflict that became known as the War of 1812. During the summer little was done in Vermont beyond organizing the 11th infantry, which seems to have consisted originally of six companies from Vermont and four from New Hampshire. The army gathered at Plattsburgh, New York, numbering about eight thousand men, of whom nearly one half were Vermonters. Among them was the 11th regiment of regulars under Col. Isaac Clark (12 March 1812 to 27 April 1814).

On 16 November 1812 the largest portion moved north under the immediate command of Maj. Gen. Henry Dearborn, then the senior officer of the army, and on 18 November encamped about half a mile south of the Canadian boundary line. The force there assembled numbered three thousand regulars and two thousand militia, while the entire British force on the northern frontier did not exceed three thousand, and of these not more than one thousand were within striking distance of the American army. When Dearborn was prepared to cross the line, the British Major Salaberry also prepared to meet him. Early in the morning of 20 November, a detachment of Dearborn's army forded the La Colle river and surrounded a British guard-house, which was occupied by Canadian militia and a few Indians, who broke through the American lines and escaped unhurt. In the meantime a second party of the Americans had advanced, and commenced a sharp fire on those in possession of the ground, mistaking them for the British picket. This fire continued for nearly half an hour, when, being undeceived, both parties hastily retreated, leaving behind five killed and as many wounded. The troops immediately afterwards returned to Champlain, and on 23 November to Plattsburgh, when the militia were disbanded, and the 11th U.S. regiment was sent to Burlington, with the 9th, 21st, and 25th, all under the command of Brig. Gen. John Chandler of Maine.

The Vermont non-intercourse act, passed 6 November 1812, provided "that all officers, civil and military, of this State, shall aid in currying this act into full force"; and therefore, immediately after the return of the 11th U.S. regiment and militia from Pittsburgh, a vigorous enforcement of the act along the northern boundary line of Vermont was commenced. In this work Col. Isaac Clark of the 11th Infantry regiment, and Lieut. Col. Edward Fifield of the militia, were conspicuous.

10 February 1813, the Secretary of War ordered Gen. Dearborn to move the two brigades at Plattsburgh (Bloomfield's and Chandler's, numbering 2480 men,) to Sackett's Harbor; and 14 March Dearborn complied, leaving no troops at Plattsburgh, and only the 11th regiment of infantry and a company of artillery at Burlington. The 11th Infantry regiment was not full at that time, but was to be filled in a few weeks.

13 May 1813, five hundred men from the 11th Infantry regiment, being the first battalion, were ordered to Sackett's Harbor, and on 31 May left Burlington under the command of Lieut. Col. Timothy Upham.

This 11th Infantry Regiment participated in the following: the Battle of Crysler's Farm; the Second Battle of Lacolle Mills; the Raid on Port Dover, the Capture of Fort Erie, the Battle of Chippawa, where Colonel John B. Campbell (9 April to 28 August 1814), was mortally wounded and the 11th Infantry came under command of Maj. John McNeil, who was breveted Lt. Col. for his actions; and the Battle of Lundy's Lane.

The third colonel of the regiment, Moody Bedel (4 September 1814 to 17 May 1815), became a brigadier general during the War of 1812. He was the son of Timothy Bedel a commander during the American Revolution. Moody Bedel's son John Bedel was a brigadier general of volunteers during the American Civil War.

It was consolidated May–October 1815 with a company of the 25th Infantry and a company each of the 27th, 29th, and 37th Infantry to form a company of the 6th Infantry. The present 6th United States Infantry traces its lineage back to this 11th Infantry Regiment. for the First U.S. 6th Infantry Regiment see: 2nd Infantry Regiment (United States)

The official U.S. Army lineage of the present 11th Infantry Regiment starts with the Civil War in 1861.

=== Mexican–American War ===
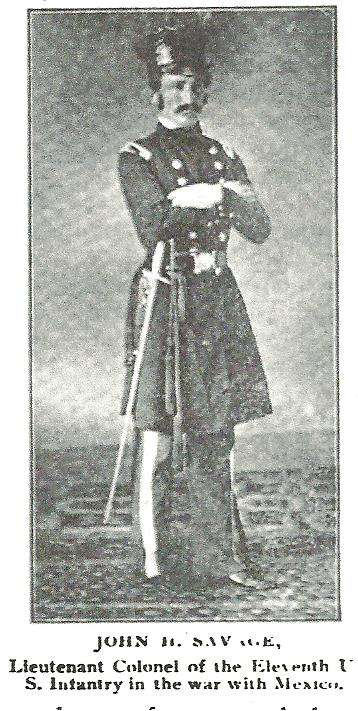
Lt John H Savage

The third 11th U.S. regiment of infantry was authorized by Congress on 11 February 1847, as a one-year regiment for the Mexican–American War.

Albert C. Ramsey was appointed Colonel of the 11th Infantry on 9 April 1847, headquarters at Baltimore. The companies of infantry to be raised in Pennsylvania, Delaware, and Virginia.

The 11th Infantry participated in the following: Battle of Cerro Gordo, the Battle of Contreras, the Battle of Churubusco, the Battle of Molino del Rey (Lieutenant-Colonel William M. Graham, Eleventh Infantry, whose regiment had participated actively in capturing Molinos del Rey, received two wounds, either of which was mortal, and fell at the head of his command while leading a charge against the northern angle of the buildings. A portion of his regiment, under Lieuts. Thomas F. McCoy and Benjamin F. Harley, was active in pursuit of the Mexicans after the attack on the Casa, Mata.), the Battle of Chapultepec and the Battle for Mexico City under command of Col. William Trousdale.

This 11th Infantry Regiment was disbanded in August 1848.

Officers of this regiment that served in the Civil War:

- Lt.-Col. John H. Savage, Col. C. S. A. Civil War.
- Captain Charles T. Campbell, Brig. Gen. U.S. Vol. Civil War.
- Captain Arthur C. Cummings, Bvt. Maj.; Col. C. S. A. Civil War.
- Captain William H. Irwin, Bvt. Maj.; Col. U.S. V. Civil War.
- Captain William B. Taliaferro, Maj. 9th infantry; Col. C. S. A. Civil War.
- 1st Lt. William H. Gray, Col. U.S. Vol. Civil War.
- 1st Lt. John I. Gregg, Col. U.S. Vol. Civil War.
- 1st Lt. Thomas F. McCoy, Col. U.S. Vol. Civil War.
- 2d Lt. John A. Bayard, 2d Lt. U.S. Vol. Civil War; died 3 August 1863, of wounds received at the battle of Gettysburg, Pa.
- 2d Lt. James Elder, Capt. U.S. Army Civil War.
- 2d Lt. William. Murray, Col U.S. Vol. Civil War; killed 23 March 1862, at the battle of Winchester, Va.
- 2d Lt. Andrew H. Tippin, Bvt. 1st Lt. Contreras and Churubusco; Col. U.S. Vol. Civil War.
- 2d Lt. Thomas Welsh, Brig. Gen. U.S. Vol. Civil War; died 16 August 1863, of malaria contracted at Vicksburg.
- 2d Lt. Junins B. Wheeler. Capt. U.S. Army. Civil War.

=== Old Eleventh Infantry ===
This was the regiment known as the Eleventh Infantry Regiment during the American Civil War until 1869. The official U.S. Army lineage of three present-day U.S. Infantry regiments trace back to this regiment.

==== Civil War ====
The fourth 11th Infantry was organized on 4 May 1861 by direction of the President. On 14 May 1861, President Abraham Lincoln issued an executive order, directing an increase of the regimental organizations of the Regular Army. The 11th Infantry was the first, numerically, of the nine infantry regiments, of three battalions of eight companies each, were of the increase authorized. In G. O. No. 33, A. G. O., series of 1861, in contrast to the original ten regular regiments of infantry, which were organized on the traditional ten-company line. The 11th Infantry was organized at Fort Independence, Boston Harbor, Massachusetts, as regimental headquarters, and which remained the 11th's headquarters during the War. Erasmus D. Keyes was served as colonel of the 11th U.S. Infantry from 14 May 1861 to 6 May 1864. William S. Ketchum served as colonel of the 11th U.S. Infantry 6 May 1864 to 15 March 1869.

After six companies had been organized and assigned to the 1st Battalion, 11th Infantry Regiment, it was ordered to Perryville, Maryland, 10 October 1861, and duty there until March 1862. Ordered to Washington, D.C. Attached to Sykes' Regular Infantry, Reserve Brigade, Army Potomac, to May 1862. The 11th then campaigned September 1863 to November 1864 as part of the 5th Army Corps, Army of the Potomac and 8th Army Corps, Middle Department, to January 1865.

The 11th took part in the following: Peninsula Campaign, Siege of Yorktown, Battle of Mechanicsville, Gaines' Mill, Turkey Bridge 30 June, Battle of Malvern Hill Malvern Hill, At Harrison's Landing until 16 August. Movement to Fortress Monroe, thence to Centerville 16–28 August. Pope's Northern Virginia Campaign, Battle of Groveton 29 August, Second Battle of Bull Run, Maryland Campaign, Battle of Antietam, Shepherdstown Ford 19–20 September, Battle of Fredericksburg, "Mud March", Chancellorsville Campaign 27 April – 6 May, Battle of Chancellorsville, Gettysburg campaign, Battle of Gettysburg, Pursuit of Lee 5–24 July. On special duty at New York 21 August – 14 September. Rejoined army, Bristoe Campaign, Second Battle of Rappahannock Station, Mine Run Campaign, Rapidan Campaign, Battle of the Wilderness, Battle of Spotsylvania Court House, North Anna River, Pamunkey 26–28 May, Battle of Totopotomoy Creek, Battle of Cold Harbor, Bethesda Church 1–3 June, Second Battle of Petersburg, Siege of Petersburg, Mine Explosion, Petersburg, Weldon Railroad, Poplar Springs Church, Peeble's Farm, Boydton Plank Road, Hatcher's Run.

Moved to Fort Hamilton, New York Harbor, 2 November, thence to Baltimore, Maryland., 18 November, and to Annapolis, Maryland., 5 December. Duty at Camp Parole, Annapolis, Md., until 26 January 1865. Ordered to City Point, Virginia., 26 January, and camp near Gen. Grant's Headquarters until 8 March. Provost duty at Headquarters, Army Potomac, until May, and at Richmond. Va., until October 1865.

The regiment lost during the Civil War 8 officers and 117 enlisted men killed and mortally wounded and 2 officers and 86 enlisted men by disease. Total, 213.

After the surrender, the 11th Infantry with other Regular troops, was sent to Richmond, Va., where it arrived May 3d. It did provost duty in Richmond until the civil government of the city was organized, and at Libby Prison until its use was discontinued. During the summer and fall of 1865 the twenty-four companies of the regiment were organized. In the summer of 1866, the regiment suffered a great mortality from cholera.

===== Medal of Honor =====
1st Lt. John H. Patterson was awarded the Medal of Honor for courage under fire at the Battle of the Wilderness.

CAPT James Madison Cutts received the award on 2 May 1891 for his actions as a captain in the 11th Infantry Regiment, US Army, at the Battle of the Wilderness, Virginia, the Battle of Spotsylvania Court House, Virginia, and the Battle of Petersburg, Virginia, all between 5 May 1864 and 18 June 1864.

===== Biographies =====
The following men served in the 11th Infantry during the Civil War: John S. Mason, Frederick Steele, Charles Sawyer Russell, John C. Bates, DeLancey Floyd-Jones, and David R. Lillibridge.

==== 1866 Army reorganization ====
By an Act of Congress, dated 28 July 1866, the three battalion regiments were discontinued and the Army was reorganized. The 11th was divided into three regiments, each battalion receiving two additional companies and being organized along traditional lines. The 1st Battalion was given the designation of the 11th Infantry, while the 2nd Battalion became the 20th Infantry and the 3rd Battalion the 29th Infantry. Soon afterward the 29th Infantry (3d Battalion) was ordered to Lynchburg, Virginia. In January 1866, the 20th Infantry (2d Battalion) was ordered to New Orleans, Louisiana, leaving the 1st Battalion heir to the colors and records of the 11th Infantry.

Company B, 1st Battalion, 11th Infantry was reorganized and redesignated on 5 December 1866 as Company B, 11th Infantry.

==== 1869 Army reorganization ====
Company B, 11th Infantry was consolidated 31 March 1869 with Company B, 34th Infantry and consolidated unit redesignated as Company B, 16th Infantry.

Though the present-day 11th Infantry does not trace its lineage to this regiment it was referred to as the origin of the current 11th Infantry up to at least 1931.

== Present 11th Infantry Regiment ==
The fifth 11th Infantry Regiment, to which the present-day 11th traces its lineage.

=== Lineage ===
The 11th Infantry was constituted on 3 May 1861 by president Abraham Lincoln in the Regular Army as Company A, 2d Battalion, 15th Infantry. It was organized on 6 May 1862 at Newport Barracks, Kentucky, as one of the nine "three-battalion" regiments of regulars, each battalion containing eight companies of infantry, in contrast to the original ten regular regiments of infantry, which were organized on the traditional ten-company line.

As Company A, 2d Battalion 15th Infantry, the regiment first campaigned as part of the Army of the Ohio and later as part of the Army of the Cumberland, participating in such battles as Shiloh, the Kentucky Campaign, Chickamauga, Murfreesboro, the Battle of Atlanta, and the march through Georgia.

==== 1866 Army reorganization ====
Company A, 2d Battalion, 15th Infantry was reorganized and redesignated on 1 December 1866 as Company A, 24th Infantry.

==== 1869 Army reorganization ====
The 24th Infantry (originally 2nd Battalion 15th Infantry) was consolidated into five companies, and the 29th Infantry (originally 3rd Battalion 11th Infantry) also into five companies, and by General Orders No. 80, dated 5th Military District, 25 April 1869, the consolidation of the two regiments into the Eleventh Infantry was completed and designated as Company A, 11th Infantry.

General Orders No. 17.
Headquarters of the Army, Adjutant General's Office, Washington, 15 March 1869.
Reorganization of the Infantry of the Army.

16. Eleventh infantry, to be composed of the 24th and 29th regiments.—The 24th and 29th regiments, in the department of Texas, will be consolidated for service in that department, and will hereafter be known as the 11th infantry. The field officers will be: Alvan C. Gillem, colonel; George P. Buell, lieutenant colonel; Lyman Bissell, major.

Report of Brevet Major General E. R. S. Canby.
Headquarters First Military District,
State of Virginia, Richmond, Va., 10 October 1869.

Richmond and vicinity.—six companies of the Eleventh Infantry,
Lynchburg.—Headquarters Twenty-ninth and two companies of the Eleventh Infantry.
Lexington.—One company Eleventh Infantry.
Warrenton.—One company Eleventh Infantry.
In the month of March the Eleventh Infantry was transferred to the fourth military district.

The fifth or present Eleventh Infantry was formed by the consolidation of the 24th and 29th Regiments of Infantry on 25 April 1869.

=== Indian Wars ===
==== Department of Texas ====
October 1869:

Bryan, Texas Bvt. Major T.H. Norton 11th Inf. 1 Company
Galveston, Texas Bvt. Maj. Gen. A.C. Gillem 11th Inf. 1 Company
Austin, Texas 11th Inf. 1 Company
Jefferson, Texas Maj. Lyman Bissell 11th Inf. 1 Company
Greenville, Texas 11th Inf. 1 Company
Brenham, Texas Bvt. Lt. Col. James Biddle 11th Inf. 1 Company
Columbus, Texas Bvt. Maj. Charles A. Wikoff (25 April 1869 – 8 December 1886 Commanded Company E)

On 5 June 1871, Company F of the Eleventh Infantry was sent to Fort Phantom Hill, a subpost of Fort Griffin, with a six-man detachment of the Fourth Cavalry, to protect the traffic through the area, and to guard the mail station at Mountain Pass, the first stop south of Phantom Hill. On 10 June 1871, a few days after its arrival at Mountain Pass, the Eleventh Infantry detachment was attacked by a war party of about seventy-five Comanches and Kiowas. A skirmish of one and a half hours ensued until the Indians broke off hostilities, with six killed and several wounded.

19 June 1871, Company H, Eleventh Infantry, with six companies of the Fourth Cavalry, and twenty Tonkawa scouts, under Colonel Ranald S. Mackenzie left Fort Richardson.

10 October 1871, Companies F and I, Eleventh Infantry, took part in the Battle of Blanco Canyon under Col. Ranald S. Mackenzie.

On 10 January 1872, Company G (Captain Theodore Schwan commanding 1869–1886), Eleventh Infantry, reestablished Fort Phantom Hill. 8 February 1872, Company G was replaced by Company A of the Eleventh Infantry, along with two Tonkawa scouts and a six-man detachment of the Fourth Cavalry. On 8 March 1872, Company A at Phantom Hill was relieved by Company F and was replaced 6 April, for the last time by Company G.

15 June 1872, a detachment from Company H, Eleventh Infantry at Fort Concho in San Angelo, Texas successfully defended Johnson's Mail Station against an Indian raid.

===== Medal of Honor =====
5 August 1872, Private Franklin M. McDonald, Company G, Eleventh Infantry, escorted a mail coach from Jacksboro, Texas, to Fort Griffin. Fifteen miles from Fort Belknap and near Fort Griffin, it was attacked by a band of eight to 10 Kiowa Indians. McDonald was awarded the Medal of Honor for gallantry in defeating Indians who attacked the mail.

2 April 1873, Eleventh Infantry at Fort Stockton, Texas to escort surveyors on the Rio Pecos.

===== Red River War =====
During the Red River War, the regiment was in the following actions:

5 February 1874, Lieutenant-Colonel George P. Buell, Eleventh Infantry, with Troops G and D, Tenth Cavalry, Company F, Eleventh Infantry, and detachments of Companies A and G, Eleventh Infantry, attacked a camp of hostile Qua ha dee Comanches on the Double Mountain Fork Brazos River, Texas, killed eleven Indians and captured sixty-five horses. One enlisted man was wounded in the fight.

20 July 1874, in Palo Pinto County, Texas, a detachment of two officers, nine men and nine Tonkawa scouts, under command of Lieutenant Colonel G. P. Buell, Eleventh Infantry, attacked a war party of Indians and captured one horse.

August 1874, Lieutenant Colonel George Buell was to lead four companies of the Ninth Cavalry, two of the Tenth, two companies of the Eleventh Infantry, and thirty scouts from Fort Griffin to Fort Sill, Indian Territory, and then west to operate along the Salt Fork of the Red River.

23 August 1874, Company H, Eleventh Infantry, left Fort Concho in a column with eight companies of the Fourth Cavalry, four companies of the Tenth, and an assortment of scouts Under the command of Colonel Mackenzie.

10 September 1874, Companies D, E, and I of the Eleventh Infantry commanded by Captain Charles A. Wikoff (25 April 1869 – 8 December 1886 Commanded Company E) and six companies of the Tenth Cavalry, a section of mountain howitzers, and Indian scouts, led by Lieutenant Colonel John W. Davidson, returned to Fort Sill by 16 October 1874. Company C, Eleventh Infantry and two companies of the Tenth Cavalry were left to garrison Fort Sill.

26 September 1874, Company H, Eleventh Infantry, in a column with eight companies of the Fourth Cavalry, four companies of the Tenth, and an assortment of scouts Under the command of Colonel Mackenzie fought a skirmish in Tule Canyon when Indians attacked at night attempting to stampede the horses.

28 September 1874, Company H, Eleventh Infantry, in the same column attacked a camp of Comanche, Kiowa, and Southern Cheyenne in the Battle of Palo Duro Canyon under Colonel Mackenzie.

9 October 1874, on Salt Fork of Red River, Texas, the scouts of a column consisting of Companies A, E, F, H, and I, Eleventh Infantry, under Lieutenant-Colonel Buell, Eleventh Infantry, struck a band of Kiowas, killed one of them, and destroyed their camp. Pursuit was made for a considerable distance, the main column destroying several hundred lodges in various abandoned camps, but the Indians escaped northward.

8 November 1874, Troops B, C, F, and H, Tenth Cavalry, detachments Companies E and I, Eleventh Infantry, and thirty Indian scouts, all under command of Capt. C. D. Viele, Tenth Cavalry, were detached from Colonel Davidson's column near McClellan Creek, Texas, to pursue the band attacked by Lieutenant Baldwin the same day. Captain Viele's command chased the Indians for a distance of ninety-six miles, having several slight skirmishes with the rear guard of Indians and capturing a number of ponies and mules, the latter packed, which the Indians had abandoned in the flight.

7 December 1874, Major G.W. Schofield, with D, K, and M Companies of the Tenth Cavalry and Company C, Eleventh Infantry left Fort Sill. Marched more than 200 miles between the Canadian and Washita returning on 31 December 1875.

May 1875, Companies B, E, and K, Eleventh Infantry, at Fort Richardson.

===== Department of Dakota =====
In August and September 1876, the regiment was sent from the Department of Texas to the Department of Dakota for field service in connection with the Great Sioux War of 1876-77 in the Dakota Territory and in Montana. The larger part of the regiment (seven companies) was sent to the Cheyenne River Agency, Dakota (later called Fort Bennett), where these troops were hutted for shelter during the winter, and three companies were stationed at Standing Rock Agency, Dakota. In 1877 the regiment was transferred from the Department of Texas to the Department of Dakota.

In April and May 1877, three companies (C, F and G) were moved from Cheyenne Agency, and three companies (A, B and H) from Fort Yates in the Standing Rock Agency to the Little Big Horn, Montana, under the command of Lieut.-Colonel G. P. Buell, 11th Infantry, where they constructed the post of Fort Custer.

Early in July ten companies of the Seventh Cavalry, four of the First, and two (D and H) of the Eleventh Infantry, were dispatched to establish a summer camp near Bear Butte, north of Deadwood to scout the region lying north, northeast, east, and southeast from that point and keep the country clear of Indians. Four of these companies (two of cavalry and two of infantry) have since been assigned to constitute this winter's garrison for the new post near that place now being constructed under the direction of Major Henry M. Lazelle, First Infantry. The balance of this command is still occupying its camp. This camp became Fort Meade.

During the years 1877 and 1878 the different companies of the regiment were employed as occasion demanded on expeditions and scouts against hostile Indians.

April 1879, Captain George K. Sanderson, Company C, Eleventh Infantry, sent from Fort Custer to the Custer battlefield to police and rebury any exposed remains.

12 October 1880, Camp Poplar River, Mont., established, Companies B and F, Eleventh Infantry, from Fort Custer, arriving this day and taking station.

18 October 1880, Camp Porter, Mont., on the right bank of the Yellowstone, about 3 miles above the mouth of Glendive Creek, was established by Company A, Eleventh Infantry, from Fort Sully, and Company B, Seventeenth Infantry, from Fort Yates, as a winter camp for troops guarding working parties and material on the Northern Pacific Railroad.

11 November 1880, Lieutenant Frederick F. Kislingbury, Eleventh Infantry, with a detachment consisting of twelve men, Second Cavalry, and ten Crow scouts, was attacked by a war party of Sioux near the mouth of the Musselshell, Montana, and had one horse killed and three wounded; one of the hostiles was reported killed.

On 2 January 1881, Company F, 11th Infantry, was engaged in an attack upon hostile Indians, under Sitting Bull, near Camp Poplar Creek (now the Fort Peck Indian Reservation), as part of the command of Major G. Ilges, 5th Infantry.

The infantry battalion, composed of Company F, 11th Infantry, and detachments of Companies A, B and E, 7th Infantry, and one three-inch gun, all under command of Captain Ogden B. Read, 11th Infantry, left the agency at 11.30 A. M., marched three miles, crossed the Missouri River, took and held a point of timber commanding the lower village of the Indians until joined by Major Ilges with the main command (5 companies 5th Infantry, 1 company 7th Cavalry and an artillery detachment). The attack commenced at once, and after an engagement of about one hour, during which Company F was engaged in firing upon and turning back Indians attempting to escape from the artillery fire, resulted in the capturing of three Indian villages and their destruction. 324 prisoners were taken, with about 300 ponies and a large number of arms. No casualties among the troops. Loss of enemy in killed and wounded not known.

7 November 1881, Troop G, Seventh Cavalry, and Company G, Eleventh Infantry, were relieved from duty in this department and ordered to proceed to Fort Leavenworth, Kansas, for duty at the School of Instruction [forming the first garrison].

26 January 1882, Richard I. Dodge promoted to Colonel, commanding, Eleventh Infantry, the first four years at Fort Sully, Dakota Territory.

May 1883, Department of Dakota annual marksmanship competition at headquarters Fort Snelling, Minnesota, Eleventh Infantry had the best overall scores in the entire Army taking home two medals.

28 June 1883, Col. Dodge was ordered to report to Fort Snelling in order to escort General of the Army Sherman and General Terry on a 10,000-mile inspection tour across the northern tier of territories, on to the Pacific Northwest, south through California, and east through the Southwest to Denver.

Company K, Thirteenth Infantry, arrived and took station at Fort Leavenworth, Kans., 9 September 1886, relieving Company G, Eleventh Infantry, which left 11 September 1886, for Fort Abraham Lincoln, Dak., per Special Orders No. 116, Headquarters Division Missouri, 1886.

13 September 1886, Company G, Eleventh Infantry, arrived and took station at Fort Abraham Lincoln from Fort Leavenworth, Kans.

20 August 1886, Companies C and H, Eleventh Infantry, left Fort Buford, Dak., by boat to proceed to and take station at Fort Yates, Dak.; arrived 26 August.

17 April 1887, Company E, Eleventh Infantry, Captain Myer, Eleventh Infantry, commanding, left Fort Sully for Crow Creek Agency, pursuant to War Department order, to aid the agent in removing intruders from the Sioux or Crow Creek and Winnebago reservations, Dakota, under a proclamation by the President of 21 August 1885, declaring inoperative executive order of 27 February 1885, opening certain portions of said reservations to settlement. Arrived there 21 April; returned 27 May.

27 May 1887, Company E, Eleventh Infantry, reported on last return as having left Fort Sully 17 April 1877, to aid in removing settlers from the Sioux, or Crow Creek, and Winnebago reservations, Dak., returned, having accomplished the duty assigned.

Stationing of the companies of the Eleventh Infantry in the Department of Dakota.
station	1876	1877	1878	1879	1880	1881	1882	1883	1884	1885	1886	1887
Fort Bennett, Dakota	HQ Band C D E F G I K	HQ Band D E I K	HQ Band A D E G I K	HQ D E G I	E	E	E	E	I	I	I	I
Fort Custer, Montana		A B C F G H	B C F H	B C F H	C H	C H	C H	C H				
Camp Poplar River, Montana					B F	B F	B F	B F	B F			
Camp Porter Montana						A	A					
Fort Buford, Dakota									C H	C H		
Fort Sully, Dakota				A K	HQ Band A G I K	HQ A G I K	HQ I K	HQ A D I K	HQ A D E K	HQ A D E K	HQ A D E K	HQ A D E K
Fort Yates, Dakota	A B H										B C F H	B C F H
Fort Abraham Lincoln, Dakota					D	D	D		B F	B F		G
Fort Leavenworth, Kansas							G	G	G	G	G	

==== Bandmaster ====
Achille La Guardia (1849–1904), the father of Fiorello La Guardia, Mayor of New York, was Bandmaster of the 11th U.S. Infantry from 1885–1898. He served in the 11th Infantry at Fort Sully, Dakota Territory; Madison Barracks, New York; Fort Huachuca and Whipple Barracks, Arizona Territory; Jefferson Barracks, Missouri and Tampa, Florida.

==== Division of the Atlantic ====
In July 1887, the regiment left the Department of Dakota for service in the Division of the Atlantic, where it was stationed in the Lake Regions with headquarters and Companies A, D, G and H at Madison Barracks, Sackets Harbor, New York. Company B at Fort Wood, Bedlow's Island, New York Harbor, Companies E and K at Fort Niagara, Youngstown, New York, Company C at Fort Ontario Oswego, New York and Company F at Plattsburgh Barracks, Plattsburgh, New York.

==== Department of Arizona ====
November 1891 Company I [the Apaches ], stationed at Whipple Barracks transferred from the 9th Infantry to the 11th at Fort Huachuca.

December 1891 Eleventh Infantry transferred from Madison Barracks to Fort Huachuca.

April 1892 headquarters and band and one Company transferred to Whipple Barracks.

May 1892 Company C from Fort Niagara Companies A and D from Madison Barracks arrive at Whipple Barracks followed by Companies G and K. Companie B and E at Fort Apache, and Companies F and H at San Carlos in the Arizona Territory.

September 1893, General McCook ordered that the Apaches in Company I, Eleventh Infantry, be discharged when their furloughs expired in July 1894.

April 1898 Eleventh Infantry transferred from Whipple Barracks to Jefferson Barracks, St. Louis, Missouri.

The regiment became known as the Wandering 11th when between 1898 and 1920, the 1st Battalion made 29 changes of station, including seven years of foreign service.

==== War with Spain ====
The Eleventh Infantry left Jefferson Barracks, Missouri, 19 April 1898, then to a training camp near Mobile, Alabama, via Chickamauga, and on to Tampa, Florida arriving 7 June, for transport to Puerto Rico aboard the steamship Mohawk.

During The Spanish–American War, the Eleventh Infantry saw action under Brigadier General Theodore Schwan in the Battle of Silva Heights in the Puerto Rican Campaign.

1900 San Juan, Puerto Rico, headquarters, band, and 5 companies Eleventh Infantry.

The following officers received distinguished mention in General Schwan's reports, for service rendered under fire during the campaign in western Puerto Rico:

- Lieutenant-Colonel Burke, Eleventh Infantry.
- Major Gilbreath, Eleventh Infantry.
- Captain P. M. B. Travis, Eleventh Infantry.
- Captain R. W. Hoyt, Eleventh Infantry.
- Captain A. L. Myer, Eleventh Infantry.
- Captain Penrose, Eleventh Infantry.
- Lieutenant Odón Gurvoits, Eleventh Infantry.
- Lieutenant T. F. Maginnis, Eleventh Infantry.
- Lieutenant Alexander, Eleventh Infantry.
- Lieutenant Wells, Eleventh Infantry.

=== Department of the East ===
Movements of troops from and to extraterritorial stations from November–December 1900. Headquarters, Companies I and M, Eleventh Infantry, arrived at Washington Barracks, D. C., from Porto[sic] Rico.

Companies K and L, Eleventh Infantry, arrived at Fort McPherson, Georgia.

Companies A, B, C, and D, Eleventh Infantry, for Fort Columbus, New York Harbor. (Home Battalion.)

=== Philippine Insurrection ===
During the Philippine–American War from 1901–1903, the Eleventh Infantry was sent to the Philippines to help put down the Moro Rebellion, where it was in engagements against the Moros of Mindanao and the Filipinos of the Visayas.

==== Department of the Visayas ====
After the Balangiga massacre, the survivors escaped to Leyte where nightmarish accounts made their way into the front pages of US newspapers. The Eleventh Infantry Regiment and the U.S. Marines led by Major Littleton Waller were quickly dispatched to Balangiga with orders from Brigadier General Jacob Smith. On or about 29 September 1901, the town was reoccupied by two companies of the Eleventh Infantry to secure the American position and bury the American dead. The Bells of Balangiga were taken as booty of war when the Eleventh left.

==== Department of Mindanao ====
Office Company E, Eleventh Infantry, Camp at Mataling Falls, Mindanao, P. I., 1 September 1902. The Adjutant, Mataling Falls.

"Sir: I have the honor to report that a hunting party of 1 sergeant and 7 privates, Company E, Eleventh Infantry, while on the road to Malabang and about 1½ miles from camp, 31 August 1902, were ambuscaded by a force of hostile Moros. Conservative estimate of strength of Moros, 15 rifles and 25 bolos. At first volley Private Charles M. Branson was killed and Privates Logsdon and Foster seriously wounded. The survivors fell back firing. The wounded men lying on the ground called for assistance. Sergeant Nash, Privates William D. Howard, William R. Bryan, and Fred Houck rushed forward and secured the two wounded men and their equipments in the face of the Moro fire, from a distance not exceeding 15 yards. They carried the wounded men toward camp for nearly a mile, keeping the Moro party who had pursued them at bay.

Private Joseph Dubian, after emptying his rifle, rushed to the camp for assistance. Company E being notified by the commanding officer to hasten to attack hostile Moros, that company proceeded with all possible speed to the scene of the attack, but were unable to gain contact with the enemy. The body of Private Branson was found frightfully mutilated, and the ground gave indication of a large party lying in ambuscade. Sergeant Cline with 30 men was immediately sent down the road to meet the wagon train from Malabang, the size of the party of Moros justifying their attacking the train.

This party withdrew, it is believed, toward the northeast and afterwards encountered the hunting party under Lieutenants Game and Parker, and also Company F, Eleventh Infantry, under Captain Chiles.

Casualties: Private Charles M. Branson, killed, Privates Logsdon and Foster wounded, all of Company E, Eleventh Infantry; rifle No. 36224 and equipments of Private Branson captured by Moros. It is known that at least 4 Moros were hit, but no bodies were secured at scene of ambuscade.

The action of Sergeant Nash. Privates William D. Howard, William R. Bryan, and Fred Houck. Company E, Eleventh Infantry, in securing their wounded comrades and their arms under the very muzzles of Moros, who outnumbered them at least 10 to 1, and after their party had virtually lost 50 per cent of its strength, was exceedingly courageous and meritorious. It is recommended that they each be given a certificate of merit for their action."

Very respectfully.

John W. Heavey, Captain, Eleventh Infantry, Commanding Company E.

==== Department of the Visayas ====
24 March to 15 July 1903, Eleventh Infantry in operations of the Surigao expedition. This was an expedition against all outlaws, ladrones, and insurrectos in this province. Col. Albert L. Myer, Eleventh Infantry, was placed in charge of the military operations in the field.

=== Department of the Missouri ===
15 February 1904.—Transport Thomas sailed from Manila for San Francisco with the Eleventh Infantry.

21 March 1904—Headquarters, Band, First and Second Battalions, Eleventh Infantry, left San Francisco, Cal., for Fort D.A. Russell, Cheyenne, Wyoming Company K, Eleventh Infantry, left San Francisco, Cal., for Fort Niobrara, Nebraska.

Company L, Eleventh Infantry, left San Francisco, Cal., for Fort Washakie, Wyoming.

7 April 1904.—Company L, Eleventh Infantry, arrived at Fort Washakie, Wyoming. The troops sent against the hostile Moros of Taraca Valley, Mindanao, returned to their station, having defeated and scattered large numbers of the enemy and destroyed their forts. Casualties, 2 enlisted men killed and 3 wounded.

28 April 1904.—Companies I and M, Eleventh Infantry, left San Francisco for Fort Mackenzie, Wyoming.

2 May 1904.—Companies I and M, Eleventh Infantry, arrived at Fort Mackenzie, Wyoming.

1 May 1906.—In connection with the 1906 earthquake relief service, the Eleventh Infantry (less headquarters of the Third Battalion and Companies I and M) left Fort D. A. Russell for temporary duty at San Francisco, and returned to the post 9 June.

Headquarters Third Battalion and Companies I and M, Eleventh Infantry, left Fort Mackenzie, by marching, for change of station to Fort D. A. Russell, arriving there at 25 May. Distance marched, 365 miles.

Fort D. A. Russell – Third Battalion, Eleventh Infantry (less Companies K and L), Eighth Battalion, Field Artillery (Twelfth and Nineteenth Batteries).

1911 the regiment was part of the Maneuver Division, San Antonio, Texas.

=== Southern Department ===
In February 1913 the regiment moved from its permanent station to Texas City, Texas as part of the mobilization of the Second Division.

During the Mexican Border Crisis 1914–1917 with Pancho Villa, the regiment served as border guards in Texas City, Texas, New Mexico, and 1915 Naco, Arizona, and April 1917 Douglas, Arizona.

1915 Company D, San Antonio, Tex., to Texas City, Texas and Company L, Little Rock, Ark., to Laredo, Texas

May to August 1917 the 11th Infantry was stationed Fort Oglethorpe, Georgia.

=== World War I ===
On 17 November 1917, the 11th Infantry was assigned to the 5th Division, and on 24 April 1918, the regiment sailed for France. By May 1918 it joined the near Chaumont, France. The 11th then took part in the campaigns in the Vosges Mountains, the Battle of Saint-Mihiel, and the Meuse-Argonne Offensive. In the second phase of the Meuse-Argonne offensive, the regiment forged a brilliant crossing of the Meuse River.

=== Interwar period ===
The 11th Infantry arrived at the port of New York on 21 August 1919 on the troopship USS Plattsburg. It was transferred on 26 July 1919 to Camp Gordon, Georgia, and transferred on 27 October 1920 to Camp Jackson, South Carolina. It conducted a 700–mile march from Camp Jackson to new duty stations in the summer of 1921. The regiment, less the 2nd and 3rd Battalions, arrived 19 October 1921 at Camp Knox, Kentucky. Shortly thereafter, the 2nd Battalion arrived at Fort Benjamin Harrison, Indiana, and the 3rd Battalion arrived at Columbus Barracks, Ohio. The regimental headquarters and 3rd Battalion were transferred on 13 October 1922 to Fort Benjamin Harrison. The regiment typically maintained one company at Camp Knox throughout the year; Company A was stationed there from 1923 to 1928 and Company B from 1928 to 1935.

The regiment participated in tornado relief duties at Indianapolis, Indiana, 10–19 May 1927. It served as honor guard to President Herbert Hoover during his visit to Indianapolis on 15 June 1931. In April 1933, the regiment assumed command and control of the Ohio–West Virginia CCC District. Company I served as honor guard to President Franklin D. Roosevelt during his visit to the Great Lakes Exposition at Cleveland, Ohio, in August 1936. The regiment participated in flood relief duties along the Ohio River in January–February 1937, and constructed refugee camps in February 1937 for flood victims at Lawrenceburg, Indiana. Assigned Reserve officers conducted summer training with the regiment at Fort Benjamin Harrison. Transferred 10 November 1939 to Fort McClellan, Alabama. After participation in maneuvers in Louisiana in May 1940, it returned to Fort Benjamin Harrison on 31 May 1940, and was transferred 6 January 1941 to Fort Custer, Michigan.

In April 1941 two companies of the 11th each were among the first US forces to garrison the new bases at Bermuda and Trinidad, established under the Destroyers for Bases Agreement with the United Kingdom.

=== World War II ===
Men of the 11th Infantry march across rough ground enroute to Winterbach, Germany, to clear out German soldiers cut off from their main troops in retreat, March 18, 1945.

In 1942 the regiment deployed to Iceland and remained there for 15 months until the regiment, and the division, moved to England.

The regiment landed in Normandy on 10 July 1944 and fought its way across France as part of the 5th Infantry Division, which was assigned to Lieutenant General George S. Patton's famed Third Army. The 11th Infantry was awarded the Croix de Guerre for its daring crossing of the Seine river at Fontainebleau following Operation Cobra. During an attempted crossing of the Moselle river at Dornot, the 2nd Battalion, 11th Infantry, sustained 363 killed and wounded in 26 counterattacks by German tanks and infantry before abandoning the bridgehead.

The 11th Infantry played a prominent role in the reduction of the fortified city of Metz in the fall of 1944, particularly during the costly Battle of Fort Driant where the regiment's 2nd Battalion was nearly destroyed again. After taking extreme casualties, Patton ordered the assault to be abandoned until Metz could be first encircled. With the Allied victory during the Battle of Metz, the German garrison at Fort Driant promptly surrendered before another attack could be mounted.

During the Battle of the Bulge, the 11th counter-attacked into the southern portion of the Bulge, engaging the Germans in bitter winter fighting.

On 22 March 1945, the 1st Battalion made a night river assault across the Rhine River at Oppenheim, giving General Patton a division bridgehead over the Rhine two days ahead of Field Marshal Bernard Montgomery's famous crossing. The 11th Infantry ended the war in Czechoslovakia.

=== Postwar ===
In 1948 the 11th was an Infantry Training Regiment, a unit of the 5th Infantry Division, stationed at Fort Jackson, South Carolina.

It was reactivated in June 1954 in Germany, the 11th returned to Fort Ord, California and became an Infantry Training Unit.

On 14 June 1958, the 1st Battle Group, 11th Infantry, was reactivated as part of the 2d Infantry Division at Fort Benning, Georgia where it remained until February 1962 when it was redesignated as the 1st Battalion, 11th Infantry and assigned as an organic element of the 5th Infantry Division at Fort Carson, Colorado.

=== Vietnam War ===
In July 1968, the 11th deployed for action in Vietnam and operated in Cam Lộ, Đông Hà, Quảng Trị, and Khe Sanh. The 11th Infantry participated in several major operations, including Operation Dewey Canyon II, Operation Wolfe Mountain, and Operation Green River. The 11th Infantry Regiment suffered 153 killed in Vietnam.

The 11th returned to Fort Carson on 6 August 1971 and served there as part of the 4th Infantry Division until 15 January 1984 when the battalion was inactivated.

Officer candidate from Bravo Company, 3rd Battailon, 11th Infantry Regiment prepares to enter a swimming pool during the combat water survival portion of Officer Candidate School at Fort Benning. March 2008

=== Modern day ===
On 14 August 1987, 1st, 2d, and 3d Battalions, The School Brigade, were redesignated as 1st, 2d, and 3d Battalions, 11th Infantry, and assigned to The School Brigade.

On 8 February 1991, the School Brigade was inactivated and redesignated as the 11th Infantry Regiment. The 1–11th was the Direct Commission Course and Basic Officer Leadership Course, Phase Two (BOLC II). 2–11th is the home of the Infantry Basic Officer Leadership Course (IBOLC/BOLC III). 3–11th is the Officer Candidate School. Since then, 1-11th has been consolidated into 3-11th, and both the Direct Commission Course and the Officer Candidate School reside in 3-11th Infantry.

On 27 June 2007 as part of the Transformation of the US Army, the 11th Infantry Regiment was redesignated the 199th Infantry Brigade at Fort Benning.

=== Distinctive unit insignia ===
Description: A silver color metal and enamel device 1 1/8 inches (2.9 cm) tall overall consisting of a shield blazoned: Azure, Satanta's arrow in fess Argent between in chief a castle Or in base a kampilan and bolo in saltire of the second hilted of the third. On a chief embattled of the second a cross Gules.

Symbolism: The symbolism is that of the coat of arms.

Background: The distinctive unit insignia was approved on 28 March 1923.

=== Coat of arms ===
- Blazon
  - Shield: Azure, Satanta's arrow in fess Argent between in chief a castle Or in base a kampilan and bolo in saltire of the second hilted of the third. On a chief embattled of the second a cross Gules.
  - Crest: On a wreath of the colors a fusil Gules bearing a cross patée Argent charged with an acorn of the first.
- Symbolism: The shield is blue for infantry. Service in the Spanish War is shown by the castle and in the Indian Wars by Satanta's "arrow." The most important Indian campaign of this regiment was against the Kiowas, Comanches and Cheyenne in 1874. Satanta was a noted Kiowa chief who died just previous to this campaign. His "arrow" was really a spear with feathers on the end and a handle. The kampilan and bolo represent engagements against the Moros of Mindanao and the Filipinos of the Visayas. Service in the World War is shown by the chief bearing the cross of the ancient Lords of Dun to commemorate the crossing of the Meuse at Dun. The embattled partition represents the siege of Chattanooga in 1863. The crest consists of the Civil War badges of the 1st Division, 14th Army Corps and 2d Division, 5th Army Corps, and the World War 5th Division shoulder sleeve insignia.
- Background: The coat of arms was approved on 12 October 1920.

=== Campaign streamers ===
- Civil War: Shiloh; Murfreesborough; Chickamauga; Chattanooga; Atlanta; Kentucky 1862; Mississippi 1862; Tennessee 1863; Georgia 1864
- Indian Wars: Comanches
- War with Spain: Puerto Rico
- Philippine Insurrection: Mindanao
- World War I: St. Mihiel; Meuse-Argonne; Alsace 1918; Lorraine 1918
- World War II: Normandy; Northern France; Rhineland; Ardennes-Alsace; Central Europe, Croix de Guerre with Streamer embroidered "Fontainebleau"
- Vietnam: Republic of Vietnam Cross of Gallantry with Palm, Streamer embroidered VIETNAM 1968, Republic of Vietnam Cross of Gallantry with Palm, Streamer embroidered VIETNAM 1971
- Army Superior Unit Award, Streamer embroidered 1999–2000

== See also ==
- List of United States Regular Army Civil War units
