= Camp Porter =

Military base in Montana, US

Coordinates: 47°09′03″N 104°41′33″W

- near Glendive, Dawson County, Montana

Site information
- Type: Winter Camp
- Controlled by: United States

Site history
- Built: 1880
- Built by: United States Army
- In use: 1880-1881
- Materials: Wood
- Battles/wars: American Indian Wars

Garrison information
- Past commanders: Captain Ira Quimby, 11th Infantry
- Garrison: 11th U.S. Infantry Company A; 17th U.S. Infantry, Company B

Camp Porter, Montana Territory, was established as a single-year camp in the Department of Dakota by the U.S. Army, to provide protection to Northern Pacific Railway construction crews during the Indian Wars.

== Established ==
Camp Porter was established on the right bank of the Yellowstone River (approximately 3 miles above the mouth of Glendive Creek) by Company A, Eleventh Infantry, from Fort Sully, and Company B, Seventeenth Infantry, from Fort Yates, on 18 October 1880, as a winter camp for troops guarding working parties and materials on the Northern Pacific Railroad (N.P.R.R.).

== History ==
June 1, 1880, Company B, Seventeenth Infantry, left Fort Yates and formed part of a command, under Major Lewis Merrill, guarding construction parties along the N. P. R. R. between the Missouri and Yellowstone rivers. It remained on this duty until October 21, when it proceeded to the Yellowstone River and established, with one company 11th Infantry, Camp Porter near the mouth of Glendive Creek. Doors, sashes and nails were furnished, the other building material was obtained by the troops, and they made themselves as comfortable as possible during the winter of 1880-81, without stoves, flooring or plastering.

July 12, 1881, Major Merrill, Seventh Cavalry, assigned to command of "escort to working parties on extension Northern Pacific Railroad, between Little Missouri and Tongue Rivers." Command consists of Troops E, Second Cavalry, and E, F, G, Seventh Cavalry, and Companies I, Fifth Infantry; D, Seventh Infantry; A, Eleventh Infantry; B, Seventeenth Infantry; and A, Twenty-fifth Infantry. Headquarters at Camp Porter, Mont. Troops from Fort Keogh changed monthly.

October 17, 1881, Company A, Eleventh Infantry, left Camp Porter, Mont., en route to Fort Sully, arriving there October 25, 1881.

== Abandoned ==
November 29, 1881, Camp Porter, Mont., was broken up as a military post, the object for which it was established having been accomplished, and the company stationed there (B, Seventeenth Infantry) left for Fort Abraham Lincoln, arriving there the same day.

December 7, 1881, Major Lewis Merrill, Seventh Cavalry (with a detachment of Company B, Seventeenth Infantry, under Lieutenant Brennan, for Fort Lincoln), left Glendive and Camp Porter, Mont., en route to his station, the work of the escort to working parties on the extension of the N. P. E. E., between Little Missouri and Tongue Rivers, having terminated and the command having been broken up. Camp Porter was finally abandoned this date, the buildings, &c., having been sold on the 6th of December.

== See also ==
- Department of Dakota Forts
- List of military installations in Montana
