= Fort Maginnis =

Fort in Montana, US

- Fergus County, 25.1 miles (40.4 km) northeast of Lewistown, Montana on Ford Creek.

Site information
- Controlled by: State of Montana

Location
- Coordinates: 47°11′7.9584″N 109°8′18.7938″W

Site history
- Built: 1880
- In use: 1880-1890
- Battles/wars: Indian Wars

Garrison information
- Past commanders: Captain Daingerfield Parker, 3rd Infantry
- Garrison: Third Infantry; First Cavalry

Fort Maginnis was established during the Indian wars in the Department of Dakota by the U.S. Army. It was the last of five forts: Keogh (1876), Custer (1877), Missoula (1877), Assinniboine (1879), and Maginnis (1880) - built following the defeat of Lieutenant Colonel George A. Custer by Native Americans at the Battle of Little Bighorn in June, 1876.

== History ==
Fort Maginnis was established in 1880, 4 1/2 miles east of Maiden, Montana Territory, (now a ghost town) by companies of the 3rd Infantry Regiment (United States) under the command of Captain Daingerfield Parker. The fort was named for Martin Maginnis, Major of the 11th Minnesota Infantry during the Civil War, and the then U.S. Representative from Montana Territory's At-large district. Elements of the 1st United States Cavalry Regiment garrisoned the post beginning in 1881. Maginnis was abandoned on July 20, 1890 and the buildings were sold to the public.

In 1879, Granville Stuart and his friend Samuel T. Hauser along with Helena banker Andrew J. Davis established the Davis, Hauser and Stuart (DHS) cattle company. Stuart was the general manager and established the ranch headquarters of the DHS on Ford Creek but downstream a few miles from Fort Maginnis. Although surrounded by open range, the ranch was located close to the fort which provided both protection from a limited Indian threat but a ready market for cattle. However this proximity to Fort Maginnis proved to be a major problem as the army claimed rights to all the hay land surrounding the fort, including that of the DHS ranch. The dispute went on for several years before the army finally returned control of the hay land to the DHS in May 1882.

In 1885, Lieutenant Colonel James W. Forsyth of the 1st Cavalry served as the fort's commander. Five years later he would command the 7th Cavalry at the Wounded Knee Massacre. In 1890, at the end of the Indian Wars, Fort Maginnis was abandoned.

== Fort McGinnis Cemetery ==
About a half mile in direct distance to the northwest from the center of the fort, and about three quarters of a mile from the fort along a faint two track road is the Fort McGinnis Cemetery. It is fenced off and appears as an indistinct rectangle on aerial photos. There are still grave markers on some of the graves, including those of non military personnel who were buried there. The cemetery, the road from the fort to the cemetery and the fort are all on land belonging to the State of Montana, and should be accessible to the public.

== Epilogue ==
Some of its buildings were purchased, dismantled, and rebuilt in Lewistown; one is the Abraham and Mary Walton Hogeland House, which is listed on the National Register of Historic Places.

== Visiting Fort McGinnis and Fort McGinnis Cemetery today ==
The site of the fort and its cemetery is little visited as it is in a remote area. The fort, its cemetery, the road from the fort to the cemetery are all on land belonging to the State of Montana, and are accessible to the public. The site of the fort is located about 27.4 miles (44.1 km) northeast of present-day Lewistown, Montana in ranching country, on the east side of the Judith Mountains, along Ford Creek. Foundations and ruins remain. The foundations that remain are substantial enough so that they may be inter-related with a plan of the fort. The GPS coordinates of the site of the fort are 47.185544° -109.138554°. The GPS coordinates of the cemetery are 47.187923°-109.147631°. Public roads from Lewistown -- US Highway 87 to Gilt Edge Road to Black Butte Road to Fort Maginnis Rd, to Collar Gulch Road --will lead to a car ford over to the site of the fort across Ford Creek on State of Montana land, which creek crossing may or may not be in good shape, but from the creek crossing it is only a short walk of a few hundred yards onto the site of the fort.

== See also ==
- Department of Dakota Forts
- List of military installations in Montana
