= Operation Wolfe Mountain =

Part of the Vietnam War (1970–1971)

- Part of the Vietnam War
Date	22 July 1970 – 30 January 1971
Location	Quảng Trị Province, South Vietnam

Belligerents
United States; South Vietnam	North Vietnam

Commanders and leaders
James W. Sutherland; William W. Davidson Jr.	

Units involved
(United States) 1st Battalion, 11th Infantry Regiment (South Vietnam) 1st Infantry Division	304th Division

Casualties and losses
27 killed	US body count: 242 killed

Operation Wolfe Mountain was a joint U.S. Army and Army of the Republic of Vietnam (ARVN) military operation during the Vietnam War to engage People's Army of Vietnam (PAVN) units in Quảng Trị Province from 22 July 1970 to 30 January 1971.

== Background ==
The concept of operations called for Task Force 1-11 comprising the 1st Battalion, 11th Infantry Regiment reinforced by ancillary units to conduct reconnaissance in force, rocket suppression and night ambush operations in Area of Operation Green (AO Green) and secure Firebase Holcomb (16.664°N 106.982°E) with one rifle company. One company operated northwest of Holcomb and another south of the Thạch Hãn River. The Battalion Reconnaissance Platoon conducted daylight surveillance and night ambushes within AO Green.

== Operation ==
On 22 July Company B 1/11th while sweeping an area where artillery had fired the previous day found the body of one Vietcong (VC). On 25 July a Claymore mine mechanical ambush set by Company D, 1/11th was triggered, a search of the area found pools of blood and used bandages indicating that PAVN/VC had been injured in the ambush. On 26 July Ranger Team 19 observed approximately 20 PAVN/VC on a trail 10 meters from their location. Gunships were requested and engaged the PAVN/VC. On 28 July Reconnaissance Team 1 exchanged small-arms fire with an estimated PAVN platoon, helicopter gunships were used against the PAVN and the team was then extracted with the extraction helicopters receiving small-arms fire. The area was then hit with mortar and 155mm howitzer fire. The engagement resulted in three PAVN killed and one secondary explosion. On 30 July a patrol from Company A 1/11th engaged an estimated PAVN squad with small-arms fire and Claymore mines. Fire was not returned and the patrol withdrew and mortar fire was placed on suspected PAVN locations, however a later search of the area revealed negative results. On 31 July Company A, 1/11th discovered an old grave containing a body and first aid pouches, two grenades, a PAVN soft cap, an AK-47 magazine and a PAVN belt. On 31 July Company A, 1/11th sighted movement on the abandoned Firebase Henderson and directed mortar fire onto the location.

On 2 August Recon Team 4 spotted one PAVN crawling towards their position approximately ten meters away. The PAVN was engaged with small-arms fire at which time an unknown size PAVN force returned fire. Mortar fire was placed on the direction of fire and gunships were called to support. The area was swept revealing two PAVN killed identified as members of the 39th Reconnaissance Company, 304th Division, one AK-47, and a pistol belt. On 4 August a mechanical ambush set by Company C, 1/11th detonated and the company observed movement in the area. The area was immediately engaged with small-arms and mortar fire. A sweep of the area found one dead VC and one severely wounded VC who died soon after, three AK-47s were captured. The VC were identified as coming from the Triệu Phong District Unit. On 7 August Company C, 1/11th exchanged small-arms fire with an unknown size enemy element. Mortar fire was placed on the route of withdrawal and a sweep of the area with a tracker dog team found one PAVN dead and three rucksacks which identified the PAVN as a member of the D29 Sapper Battalion of the 304th Division. On 10 August at 03:25 Company C, 1/11th received Rocket-propelled grenade (RPG) fire followed by a ground attack from an estimated platoon size enemy force. The Company responded with small-arms fire and artillery, helicopter gunship and AC-119 gunship fire. The enemy broke contact at 04:20. U.S. losses were two killed. A sweep of the area found four PAVN dead and one wounded, three AK-47's, an RPG-2 launcher and assorted weaponry and equipment. The prisoner was interrogated and identified himself as a member of the D29 Sapper Battalion. During the period from 9 to 15 August Firebase Holcomb received a total of 33 82mm mortar rounds resulting in two U.S. WIA and a bunker damaged. On 16 August Company B, 1/11th made contact with an unknown size enemy force, receiving small-arms and RPG fire. The company responded with small-arms fire, and artillery and helicopter gunships were employed. U.S. losses were one killed. On 18 August a mechanical ambush set by Company B, 1/11th detonated and the area was immediately engaged with small-arms fire. A sweep of the area produced five PAVN killed, three AK-47s, two RPG-2 launchers and assorted munitions and equipment. The PAVN were identified as members of the T8 Battalion, 66th Regiment, 304th Division. On 21 August a mechanical ambush set by Company D, 1/11th detonated. A sweep of the area found two PAVN dead and drag marks indicating the casualties had been removed. On 23 August a scout dog alerted Company D, 1/11th to a possible attack. Claymore mines were detonated to cover the company's front, at which time approximately 15 PAVN/VC were observed south and they were engaged with small-arms fire. A sweep of the area found one PAVN/VC killed and assorted munitions. Later that day Company D engaged an unknown size enemy force with small-arms fire, mortars, artillery and air strikes with unknown results. On 25 August Company D, 1/11th made contact with an estimated 18 PAVN/VC and engaged them with small-arms and mortar fire, and helicopter gunships were called on station. Two dead PAVN were found together with numerous blood trails.

On 31 August Company C, 1/11th and the ARVN 2nd Regiment Reconnaissance Company conducted an assault into the Đa Krông Valley. At 11:40 the ARVN found a battalion base area comprising two bunkers and three huts. At 11:45 2nd Platoon, Company C found a cooking area with food still hot. At 14:30 Company C found a lightly used trail movement was observed and noises from approximately 5 personnel was heard. At 15:00 hours Company C found a trail showing heavy usage within the past 24 hours by an estimated company sized unit. At 16:20 2nd Platoon, Company C engaged three PAVN with small-arms fire and helicopter gunships, killing two.

On 12 September an aerial assault by 2nd Platoon, Company C, 1/11th south of the Thạch Hãn River found an abandoned base area comprising numerous huts and bunkers.

On 8 October the 3rd Platoon, Company C, 1-11th conducted a Sparrow Hawk air assault. The unit received immediate small-arms fire upon insertion and returned fire, killing three PAVN. A sweep of the area found assorted munitions and equipment. On 10 October 1st Platoon, Company C, 1/11th on a Sparrow Hawk mission was inserted to search an area in response to a sighting by Ranger Team 11. They discovered assorted equipment, heavy-caliber machine gun casings and numerous trails. On 13 October Company C, 1/11th discovered one PAVN/VC killed by artillery, two bunkers and assorted equipment and personal items. On 15 October a trip flare set by Recon Team 2 detonated, the area was engaged with a Claymore mine and M79 fire. A sweep of the area revealed a blood trail. On 20 October 2nd Platoon, Company B, 1/11th found and destroyed two bunkers. On 21 October 1st Platoon, Company B, 1/11th found a base area comprising seven bunkers and assorted huts and one old PPS-43 submachine gun. On 23 October a UH-1H helicopter landed to resupply Company A, 1/11th, as the boxes of ammunition were being offloaded one of the boxes caused a booby trap, believed to have been a Claymore mine with an anti-tank mine on top to detonate wounding five Americans and causing moderate damage to the UH-1H. Throughout the month TF 1-11 located and destroyed a variety of booby-traps.

On 7 November 3 Platoon, Company D, 1/11th found a grave containing one body. On the morning of 8 November a member of Recon Team 1 detonated what was believed to have been a 155mm artillery round buried in a trail resulting in one U.S. killed and one wounded.

On 3 December while Recon Teams 5 and 6 were en route to an ambush site, a Kit Carson Scout saw five or six PAVN 200 meters southwest of their position. The team engaged the PAVN with small-arms fire, and they received AK-47 fire. Because of communication problems, the teams returned to Mai Loc Camp. A later sweep of the area revealed negative results. On the early morning of 4 December 4 Platoon, Company B, 1/11th observed four VC moving northeast, the platoon employed small-arms fire, killing one VC. While attempting to recover the body another VC detonated a mechanical ambush, killing him. Shortly thereafter, two VC were observed entering the ambush site from the northeast. Small arms fire was exchanged and artillery and mortar fire were placed in the area. A sweep of the entire area at first light revealed found three VC dead, three AK-47s and assorted munitions and equipment. The dead VC were identified as coming from the C-9 Company of the 31st Local Force Group. On 6 December 1 Platoon, Company D, 1/11th, using the PPS-5 radar at Mai Loc Camp detected three to seven personnel, the platoon then directed mortar fire into the area with unknown results. On 7 December Company A, 1/11th found four bodies approximately 90 days old which were believed to have been killed by artillery. On 12 December Recon Company Sniper Team 2 reported movement and directed artillery fire on the location, a sweep of the area found a PAVN first aid packet and expended AK-47 cartridges. On 15 December a helicopter visual reconnaissance mission observed a cooking fire and directed artillery fire on the location with unknown results. On 18 December the PPS-5 radar at Mai Loc detected at least 6 personnel. The area was engaged with mortar fire and swept at first light with negative results. On 19 December an estimated enemy platoon with B-40 rocket launchers was reported, mortar fire and artillery fire were employed on the location. A search of the area with tracker dog teams produced negative results. On 25 December Company C, 1/11th sighted three personnel moving off a hill, and while continuing observation, they received a burst of AK-47 fire which resulted in one U.S. wounded. The unit pursued and Troop C, 3rd Squadron, 17th Cavalry Regiment helicopter gunships were called to suppress the area. While sweeping the area, one dead PAVN and an AK-47 and other miscellaneous equipment were found. On 26 December a Claymore mechanical ambush set by Company C, 1/11th detonated west of their night defensive position. Mortar fire was called on the suspected enemy location. A search of the area produced three dead PAVN, two AK-47s and assorted munitions. On 31 December Recon Team 3 observed an individual in a free-fire zone and artillery fire was placed in the area. While checking out the area, Recon Team 3 received a round of small-arms fire, they returned fire, observed movement and withdrew. As the New Year ceasefire was coming into effect no further action was taken. A 3rd Platoon, Company B, 1/11th mechanical ambush detonated 75 meters southeast of their position, but no action was taken due to the ceasefire. A 2nd Platoon, Company A, 1/11th listening post observed an individual moving towards their location. When the individual was within 25 meters, the listening post detonated their defensive Claymore mines. At the same time another listening post 175 meters west of the platoon observed two personnel approached their position. When the personnel came too close the listening post detonated its defensive Claymore mines and employed fragmentation grenades. A sweep of the area at first light indicated that trip fares and mechanical ambushes had been tampered with.

On 1 January 1971 Company B, 1/11th received 10-12 60mm mortar rounds resulting in one U.S. killed and eight wounded. Troop C, 3/17th Cavalry gunships were called on station and counter battery mortar fire was employed on suspected mortar-firing location. Later that day 3rd Platoon, Company B, 1/11th discovered four bunkers showing signs of recent activity together with heavily used trails. On 4 January 2 Platoon, Company D, 1/11th observed 9-10 personnel with rucksacks approximately 700–1000 meters east of their ambush site. Approximately 30 minutes later, the unit spotted three personnel with weapons, rucksacks and steel pots on a hill. Artillery and mortar fire was called in on the suspected enemy location. A sweep of the area at first light found bloody paper. On 5 January a Kit Carson Scout attached to 3rd Platoon, Company B, 1/11th observed five personnel carrying AK-47s, however civilians in the area prevented the employment of artillery. Later that day 3rd Platoon, Company C, 1/11th found a recently used bunker and an A-47 magazine. On 11 January Company C, 1/11th found six bunkers and assorted munitions and equipment. On 17 January 2nd Platoon, Company B, 1/11th engaged an estimated two snipers approximately 200 meters west of their position. The unit employed mortar and machinegun fire on the area resulting in one PAVN killed. Blood trails were also found and a tracker dog team discovered trails of 3-4 personnel. A rucksack and an AK-47 with two magazines were captured.

== Aftermath ==
The operation concluded on 30 January 1971. The results of the operation to the end of December 1970 were 242 PAVN/VC killed for the loss of 27 U.S. killed.
