= List of military installations in Montana =

There are at least 60 current and former U.S. military installations located in Montana. Installations listed as historical are no longer in service and may have no physical remains in the state.

== Current installations ==
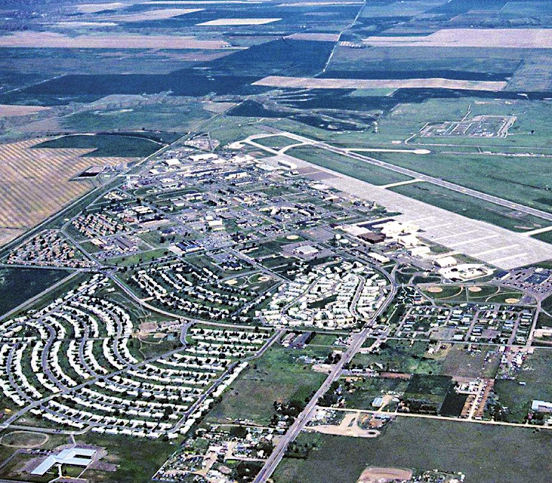
Malmstrom AFB, Great Falls, MT, 2009

- Ekalaka Mini-Mutes Radar Site, Carter County, Montana, 45°40′00″N 104°22′01″W, el. 3,205 feet (977 m)
- Fort William Henry Harrison, Lewis and Clark County, Montana, 46°37′10″N 112°06′36″W, el. 4,127 feet (1,258 m)
- Hammond Mini-Mutes Radar Site, Carter County, Montana, 45°19′10″N 104°57′14″W, el. 3,717 feet (1,133 m)
- Haycreek Mini-Mute Radar Site, Carter County, Montana, 45°42′00″N 104°43′59″W, el. 3,898 feet (1,188 m)
- Malmstrom Air Force Base, Cascade County, Montana, 47°30′19″N 111°11′01″W, el. 3,465 feet (1,056 m)

== Historical installations ==
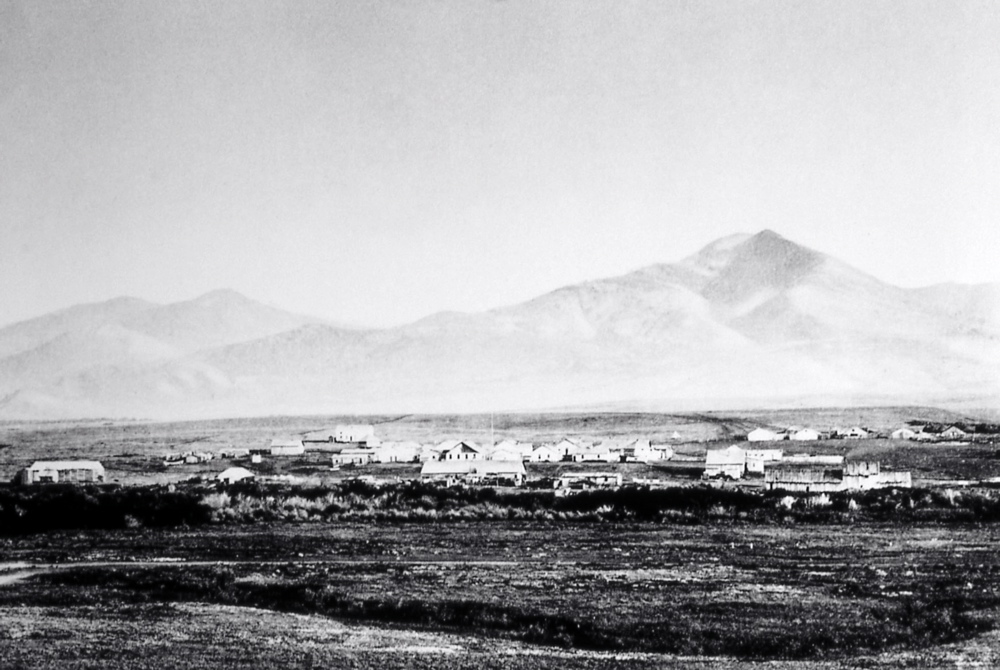
Fort Ellis, Bozeman, MT, 1871

These installations are classified as historical by the U.S. Board on Geographic Names: Historical Features – Features that no longer exist on the landscape or no longer serve the original purpose.

- Camp Baker Military Reservation, Meagher County, Montana, 46°40′43″N 111°10′19″W, el. 4,636 feet (1,413 m)
- Camp Cooke, Fergus County, Montana, 47°43′58″N 109°40′34″W, el. 2,431 feet (741 m)
  - The first U.S. Army post built in Montana on the Judith River. Established August 1866. Disbanded June 1870. Named for General Philip St. George Cooke, the commander of the Department of the Platte at the time.
- Camp Crook, Rosebud County, Montana, 45°38′00″N 106°40′00″W, el. 3,402 feet (1,037 m)
- Camp Cummings, Madison County, Montana, 45°17′38″N 111°56′43″W, el. 5,771 feet (1,759 m)
- Camp Devin, Carter County, Montana, location unknown
- Camp Lewis, Fergus County, Montana, 47°04′06″N 109°25′15″W, el. 3,927 feet (1,197 m)
- Camp Loder, Garfield County, Montana, location unknown
- Camp Merritt, Rosebud County, Montana, 45°38′00″N 106°40′00″W, el. 3,402 feet (1,037 m)
- Camp Morris, Liberty County, Montana, 48°54′30″N 111°15′08″W, el. 3,944 feet (1,202 m)
- Camp Poplar River, Roosevelt County, Montana, 48°06′47″N 105°11′52″W, el. 1,991 feet (607 m)
- Camp Porter, Dawson County, Montana, 47°09′03″N 104°41′33″W, el. 2,037 feet (621 m)
- Camp Rimini, Lewis and Clark County, Montana. About 20 miles west of Helena.
- Camp Reeve, Petroleum County, Montana, 47°27′21″N 107°54′50″W, el. 2,247 feet (685 m)
- Camp Robert B Smith, Lewis and Clark County, Montana, 46°35′25″N 112°04′00″W, el. 5,279 feet (1,609 m)
- Cantonment Rocky Point (historical), Fergus County, Montana, 47°36′00″N 108°26′15″W, el. 2,274 feet (693 m)
- Cut Bank Air Force Station (historical), Glacier County, Montana, 48°56′31″N 112°48′19″W, el. 4,167 feet (1,270 m)
- Cut Bank Army Air Field (historical), Glacier County, Montana, 48°36′30″N 112°22′37″W, el. 3,852 feet (1,174 m)
- Fort Assinniboine (historical), Hill County, Montana, 48°30′05″N 109°47′30″W, el. 2,671 feet (814 m)
- Fort Assinniboine Military Reservation (historical), Hill County, Montana, 48°30′05″N 109°47′30″W, el. 2,671 feet (814 m)
- Fort C F Smith (historical), Big Horn County, Montana, 45°18′52″N 107°54′30″W, el. 3,268 feet (996 m)
- Fort Carroll (historical), Fergus County, Montana, 47°34′25″N 108°22′22″W, el. 2,274 feet (693 m)
- Fort Custer Military Reservation (historical), Big Horn County, Montana, 45°43′35″N 107°34′30″W, el. 3,038 feet (926 m)
- Fort Elizabeth Meagher (historical), Gallatin County, Montana, 45°38′30″N 110°55′05″W, el. 5,249 feet (1,600 m)
- Fort Ellis (historical), Gallatin County, Montana, 45°39′16″N 110°56′35″W, el. 4,987 feet (1,520 m)
- Fort Fizzle (historical), Missoula County, Montana, 46°44′42″N 114°11′26″W, el. 3,383 feet (1,031 m)
  - Fort Fizzle is a wooden barricade on the Lolo Trail erected by Missoula volunteers to stop the advance of Chief Joseph during the Nez Perce War in 1877. The barricade failed when the Nez Perce climbed a steep ravine behind the ridge and bypassed the soldiers. The failure to stop the Nez Perce caused the barricade to be named Fort Fizzle.
- Fort Green Clay Smith (historical), Park County, Montana, 45°43′20″N 110°27′40″W, el. 4,383 feet (1,336 m)
- Fort Howes (historical), Powder River County, Montana, 45°17′00″N 106°08′53″W, el. 3,297 feet (1,005 m)
- Fort Howie (historical), Meagher County, Montana, 46°31′40″N 110°23′30″W, el. 4,931 feet (1,503 m)
  - Established in 1867 near Martinsdale, Montana on the Musselshell River. Disbanded in 1867. Named for Colonel Neil Howie of the Montana Militia.
- Fort Ida Thoroughman (historical), Park County, Montana, 45°43′20″N 110°27′40″W, el. 4,383 feet (1,336 m)
- Fort Keogh (historical), Custer County, Montana, 46°22′32″N 105°53′00″W, el. 2,372 feet (723 m)
- Fort Logan (historical), Meagher County, Montana, 46°40′43″N 111°10′19″W, el. 4,636 feet (1,413 m)
- Fort Maginnis (historical), Fergus County, Montana, 47°08′30″N 109°08′02″W, el. 4,160 feet (1,270 m)
- Fort Maginnis Military Reservation (historical), Fergus County, Montana, 47°10′00″N 109°07′32″W, el. 4,236 feet (1,291 m)
- Fort Missoula (historical), Missoula County, Montana, 46°50′34″N 114°03′29″W, el. 3,153 feet (961 m)
- Fort Owen (historical), Ravalli County, Montana, 46°31′11″N 114°05′45″W, el. 3,294 feet (1,004 m)
- Fort Shaw (historical), Cascade County, Montana, 47°30′32″N 111°49′12″W, el. 3,507 feet (1,069 m)
- Fort Skalkaho (historical), Ravalli County, Montana, 46°14′20″N 114°08′32″W, el. 3,599 feet (1,097 m)
- Fort Thomas F Meagher (historical), Park County, Montana, 45°42′00″N 110°31′00″W, el. 4,442 feet (1,354 m)
- Fort William Henry Harrison (historical), Lewis and Clark County, Montana, 46°37′25″N 112°05′50″W, el. 3,963 feet (1,208 m)
- Glasgow Air Force Base (historical), Valley County, Montana, 48°24′13″N 106°31′07″W, el. 2,749 feet (838 m)
- Glasgow Army Air Field (historical), Valley County, Montana, 48°12′59″N 106°36′55″W, el. 2,297 feet (700 m)
- Havre Air Force Station (historical), Hill County, Montana, 48°52′51″N 109°56′36″W, el. 3,202 feet (976 m)
- Helena Barracks (historical), Lewis and Clark County, Montana, 46°37′28″N 112°04′00″W, el. 3,868 feet (1,179 m)
- Kalispell Air Force Station, Flathead County, Montana, 48°00′41″N 114°21′53″W
- Lewistown Air Force Station (historical), Fergus County, Montana, 47°13′03″N 109°13′20″W, el. 6,424 feet (1,958 m)
- Lewistown Army Air Field (historical), Fergus County, Montana, 47°02′37″N 109°28′35″W, el. 4,167 feet (1,270 m)
- Limestone Military Reservation (historical), Big Horn County, Montana, 45°18′15″N 107°55′40″W, el. 3,379 feet (1,030 m)
- Miles City Air Force Station (historical), Custer County, Montana, 46°17′48″N 105°58′43″W, el. 2,831 feet (863 m)
- National Cemetery Military Reservation (historical), Big Horn County, Montana, 45°33′55″N 107°25′54″W, el. 3,156 feet (962 m)
- Opheim Air Force Station (historical), Valley County, Montana, 48°51′44″N 106°28′35″W, el. 3,294 feet (1,004 m)
- Powder River Supply Depot (historical), Prairie County, Montana, 46°44′26″N 105°26′03″W, el. 2,192 feet (668 m)
  - A U.S. Army steamboat landing established at the mouth of Powder River in 1876. Abandoned in 1882 when the Northern Pacific Railway reached the Powder River.
- Powder River Telegraph Station (historical), Powder River County, Montana, 45°45′32″N 105°6′55″W, el. 2,828 feet (862 m)
  - A U.S. Army telegraph repair station established on the Black Hills-Fort Keogh Telegraph route in 1878. Abandoned in 1883.
- Stanley's Stockade (historical), Dawson County, Montana, 46°55′36″N 104°52′10″W, el. 2,133 feet (650 m)
  - A U.S. Army advance supply depot established near present-day Glendive, Montana on the Yellowstone River in July 1873. Used by General Alfred Terry as his headquarters during the 1876 Sioux campaign.
- Yaak Air Force Station (historical), Lincoln County, Montana, 48°51′43″N 115°43′20″W, el. 4,970 feet (1,510 m)
