= Camp Merritt (Montana) =

United States Army camp

- Rosebud County, Montana, near Lame Deer, Montana

Site information
- Type: Military Camp

Site history
- Built: 1891
- Built by: United States Army
- Demolished: 1899 (abandoned)

Garrison information
- Garrison: 1st U. S. Cavalry

Camp Merritt was a United States Army camp established in December 1891 at the Northern Cheyenne Agency. It was named for Brevet Major General Wesley Merritt, and abandoned in 1899.

== History ==
Throughout the 1880s soldiers from Fort Keogh on the Yellowstone River had been periodically stationed near the Northern Cheyenne Agency on the Tongue River, but in 1891 after several Cheyenne's were arrested for stealing cattle, Brigadier General Wesley Merritt ordered a permanent military camp to be established at Lame Deer Agency. Camp Merritt, named after the general who ordered its construction was established in December of that year, and the Fort Keogh troops who garrisoned it were on a three-month rotation basis. As a sub-post of Fort Keogh, there were still soldiers stationed at the camp in 1899.

== Location ==
Camp Merritt is located in present-day Rosebud County, Montana, near Lame Deer.

== See also ==
- List of military installations in Montana, US
