= Department of Dakota =

- Active: 1866–1911
- Country: United States
- Branch: United States Army
- Type: Administrative District
- Part of: Division of the Missouri
- Headquarters: Fort Snelling, Minnesota; Saint Paul, Minnesota

Commanders
- Notable commanders: Alfred H. Terry; Winfield S. Hancock

A subdivision of the Division of the Missouri, the Department of Dakota was established by the United States Army on August 11, 1866, to encompass all military activities and forts within Minnesota, Dakota Territory and Montana Territory. The Department of Dakota was initially headquartered at Fort Snelling, Minnesota, and then moved to Saint Paul in March 1867. The 18th Infantry Regiment (United States) would serve in Dakota several times. From 1869-1877 the 20th Infantry Regiment (United States) was posted to the Department. In 1879 the Department returned to the Fort until 1886 at which time it moved back to downtown Saint Paul. The department was discontinued in 1911.

== Commanders ==
- Brevet Major General Alfred H. Terry (Sept. 18, 1866–May 17, 1869)
- Major General Winfield S. Hancock (May 17, 1869–Jan. 2, 1873)
- Brigadier General Alfred H. Terry (Jan. 2, 1873–1886)
- Major General Thomas Howard Ruger (1886–1891)
- Major General Wesley Merritt (1891–1895)
- Brigadier General John R. Brooke (1895–1897)
- Brigadier General James F. Wade (1897–1898)
- Brigadier General John M. Bacon (1898–1899)
- Brigadier General James F. Wade (1899-1901)
- Major General Elwell Stephen Otis (acting) (1901)
- Major General Frederick Funston (1902)
- Brigadier General William August Kobbé (1902–1904)
- Brigadier General Camillo C. C. Carr (1904–1906)
- Brigadier General John Wilson Bubb (1906–1907)
- Major General Adolphus W. Greely (1907–1908)
- Brigadier General Winfield Scott Edgerly (1908)
- Brigadier General Charles L. Hodges (1909–1910)

== Forts ==
=== Minnesota ===
- Fort Ridgely (1853–67)
- Fort Ripley (1849–77)
- Fort Snelling (1819–1994)

=== Dakota Territory ===
==== Montana ====
- Fort Assinniboine (1879–1911)
- Fort Benton (1869–81)
- Camp Cooke (1866–70)
- Fort Custer (1877–98)
- Fort Ellis (1867–86)
- Fort Keogh (1876–1924)
- Camp Lewis (1874)
- Fort Logan (1869–80)
- Fort Maginnis (1880–90)
- Camp Merritt (1890)
- Fort Missoula (1877–1918, 1921–1947)
- Camp Poplar River (1880–93)
- Camp Porter (1880–81)
- Fort Shaw (1867–91)

==== North Dakota ====
- Fort Abercrombie (1858–77)
- Fort Abraham Lincoln (1872–91)
- Cantonment Badlands (1879–83)
- Fort Berthold (1864–67)
- Fort Buford (1866–95)
- Camp Hancock (1872–77)
- Fort Pembina (1870–95)
- Fort Ransom (1867–72)
- Fort Rice (1864–78)
- Fort Seward (1872–77)
- Fort Stevenson (1867–83)
- Fort Totten (1867–90)
- Fort Yates (1874–1903)

==== South Dakota ====
- Fort Bennett (1870–91)
- Fort Dakota (1865–69)
- Post at Grand River Agency (1870–75)
- Fort Hale (1870–84)
- Fort Meade (1878- )
- Fort Randall (1856–1892)
- Fort Sisseton (1876–89)
- Fort Sully (1863–66)
- Fort Thompson (1864–71)
- Fort Wadsworth 1864-76
- Post at Whetstone Agency 1870-72

==== Wyoming ====
(Wyoming Territory became attached to the Department of the Platte on July 25, 1868)

- Fort Bridger 1858-1878, 1880–1890
- Fort Caspar 1855-1867
- Fort Fetterman 1867-1882
- Fort Halleck 1862-1866
- Fort LaClede 1863-1869
- Fort Laramie or Fort John 1849-1890
- Fort McKinney 1876-1894
- Fort Phil Kearny 1866-1868
- Fort Rawlins 1868-?
- Fort Reno 1865-1868
- Fort Robinson 1874-1948
- Fort David A. Russell 1867-1948
- Fort Sanders 1866-1882
- Fort Fred Steele 1868-1886
- Fort Washakie 1878-1913
- Fort Yellowstone 1886-1918

== Bibliography ==
- Raphael P. Thian, Notes Illustrating the Military Geography of the United States, 1813-1880 (Washington, D.C.: Government Printing Office, 1881; reprinted Austin, TX: University of Texas Press, 1979).
- Francis Paul Prucha, A Guide to the Military Posts of the United States, 1789-1895 (Madison: State Historical Society of Wisconsin, 1964).
