= Zortman, Montana =

- Census-designated place Unincorporated community
- Nickname: The cutest little town on earth
- Motto: In the heart of the Little Rocky Mountains
- Location within Montana Location within the United States
- Coordinates: 47°55′00″N 108°30′32″W
- Country: United States
- State: Montana
- County: Phillips

Area
  - Total: 3.95 sq mi (10.24 km^{2})
  - Land: 3.95 sq mi (10.24 km^{2})
  - Water: 0 sq mi (0.00 km^{2})
- Elevation: 3,993 ft (1,217 m)

Population (2020)
  - Total: 82
  - Density: 20.7/sq mi (8.01/km^{2})
- Time zone: UTC-7 (Mountain (MST))
  - Summer (DST): UTC-6 (MDT)
- ZIP code: 59546
- Area code: 406
- GNIS feature ID: 2583870

Zortman is a census-designated place and unincorporated community in Phillips County, Montana, United States. As of the 2020 census, Zortman had a population of 82. Zortman has a post office with ZIP code 59546.

The community includes the Zortman Motel and the Buckhorn Store and Cabins. The Buckhorn Store is the only store in the community. Zortman is a popular place for hunters to have dinner and stay while on their trip.

== Demographics ==
Historical population
Census	Pop.	Note	%±
2020	82		—
U.S. Decennial Census

== History ==
Prospectors arrived in the Zortman area in 1868. About 2,000 men came to Zortman in 1884, when Pike Landusky and Dutch Louie discovered gold. By 1893, Pete Zortman and a partner owned the Alabama Mine. Other mines in the area were the Ruby Mine and the Little Ben Mine. It is estimated that local mines had produced $125 million in gold by 1949.

== Climate ==
According to the Köppen Climate Classification system, Zortman has a semi-arid climate, abbreviated "BSk" on climate maps.

Zortman has a long history of wildfires. Many of the original buildings in Zortman were lost in fires during 1929 and 1944. A forest fire in 1936 reached the edges of Zortman, killing four people and burning 23,000 acres.

In July 2017, a wildfire in the Zortman area threatened the small town, and burned over 10,000 acres of forest in the Little Rocky Mountains.

Climate data for Zortman, Montana (1991–2020 normals, extremes 1896–1914, 1965–present)
Month	Jan	Feb	Mar	Apr	May	Jun	Jul	Aug	Sep	Oct	Nov	Dec	Year
Record high °F (°C)	69 (21)	70 (21)	79 (26)	86 (30)	93 (34)	102 (39)	100 (38)	103 (39)	96 (36)	98 (37)	81 (27)	67 (19)	103 (39)
Mean maximum °F (°C)	56.9 (13.8)	55.4 (13.0)	63.0 (17.2)	72.7 (22.6)	78.8 (26.0)	86.8 (30.4)	93.0 (33.9)	92.1 (33.4)	88.2 (31.2)	76.0 (24.4)	64.1 (17.8)	55.0 (12.8)	94.6 (34.8)
Mean daily maximum °F (°C)	33.7 (0.9)	34.1 (1.2)	42.5 (5.8)	51.0 (10.6)	60.7 (15.9)	69.3 (20.7)	79.2 (26.2)	79.2 (26.2)	67.9 (19.9)	53.6 (12.0)	42.4 (5.8)	34.5 (1.4)	54.0 (12.2)
Daily mean °F (°C)	23.9 (−4.5)	24.4 (−4.2)	32.2 (0.1)	40.6 (4.8)	50.0 (10.0)	58.4 (14.7)	66.3 (19.1)	65.7 (18.7)	55.6 (13.1)	43.1 (6.2)	33.2 (0.7)	25.4 (−3.7)	43.2 (6.2)
Mean daily minimum °F (°C)	14.1 (−9.9)	14.8 (−9.6)	21.9 (−5.6)	30.2 (−1.0)	39.3 (4.1)	47.4 (8.6)	53.5 (11.9)	52.2 (11.2)	43.2 (6.2)	32.7 (0.4)	23.9 (−4.5)	16.3 (−8.7)	32.5 (0.3)
Mean minimum °F (°C)	−14.8 (−26.0)	−12.9 (−24.9)	−2.4 (−19.1)	13.7 (−10.2)	24.5 (−4.2)	34.6 (1.4)	44.0 (6.7)	39.0 (3.9)	28.8 (−1.8)	14.1 (−9.9)	−0.5 (−18.1)	−10.8 (−23.8)	−22.9 (−30.5)
Record low °F (°C)	−40 (−40)	−33 (−36)	−27 (−33)	−6 (−21)	3 (−16)	20 (−7)	25 (−4)	26 (−3)	7 (−14)	−8 (−22)	−26 (−32)	−51 (−46)	−51 (−46)
Average precipitation inches (mm)	0.92 (23)	0.63 (16)	0.83 (21)	1.77 (45)	3.18 (81)	4.00 (102)	2.32 (59)	1.45 (37)	1.37 (35)	1.29 (33)	0.99 (25)	0.71 (18)	19.46 (495)
Source 1: NOAA
Source 2: National Weather Service

== Pegasus and Landusky mines ==
Zortman was home to a mine operated by Pegasus Gold Corp., which was shut down in 1997. The company went bankrupt the following year, in 1998. The Zortman mine is about a mile and a half from the Landusky mine. Both are cyanide heap-leach gold mines.

According to the Bureau of Land Management,

- "Precipitation runoff from Zortman and Landusky mines has deposited dangerous substances into nearby tributaries and rivers.
- A $13.8 million trust fund was set up to construct and operate three water capture and treatment systems."

Water treatment plants for Zortman and Landusky are operated on behalf of the Montana Department of Environmental Quality in order to preserve the water quality of the Milk and Missouri Rivers, and of the Fort Belknap Indian Reservation.
