= Fort Keogh =

United States Army outpost in eastern Montana

- 2 miles (3.2 km) west of Miles City in Custer County, Montana
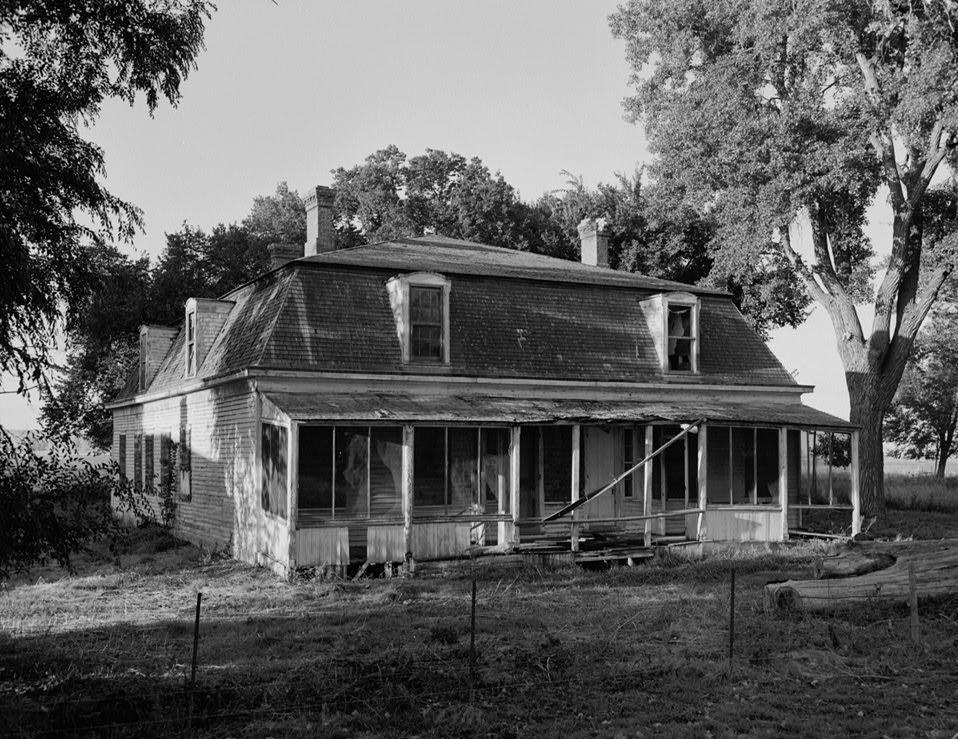
- Officers' Quarters at Fort Keogh in 1989

Site information
- Controlled by: United States

Site history
- Built: 1876
- In use: 1876–1924
- Battles/wars: Indian Wars
- Fort Keogh
- U.S. National Register of Historic Places
- Location within Montana Location within the United States
- Nearest city: Miles City, Montana
- Coordinates: 46°22′32″N 105°53′00″W
- Area: 10 acres (4.0 ha)
- Built: 1877
- NRHP reference No.: 78001680
- Added to NRHP: March 8, 1978

Garrison information
- Past commanders: Colonel Nelson A. Miles, 5th Infantry; Colonel Peter T. Swaine, 22nd Infantry
- Garrison: Fifth Infantry; Twenty-Second Infantry; Second Cavalry; Eighth Cavalry

Fort Keogh is a former United States Army post located at the western edge of modern Miles City, in the U.S. state of Montana. It is situated on the south bank of the Yellowstone River, at the mouth of the Tongue River.

Colonel Nelson A. Miles, commanding the 5th Infantry Regiment, founded the post in August 1876, in the wake of the Battle of the Little Bighorn, as a base for patrols to prevent the Cheyenne and Sioux involved in the battle from escaping to Canada. The fort was originally known as the Tongue River Cantonment for two years. When relocated one mile west in 1878, it was renamed Fort Keogh in honor of Captain Myles Keogh, who was killed at the Little Bighorn. In 1877, the fort became the headquarters for the newly created District of the Yellowstone (a sub-unit of the Department of Dakota), which was commanded by Miles.

The development of Fort Keogh as a military installation soon stimulated traders to supply the liquor and other service businesses that were the beginning of Miles City. Today the former military post is a United States Department of Agriculture livestock and range research station. It is listed on the National Register of Historic Places.

== Establishment ==
Shortly after the defeat of Lieutenant Colonel George Armstrong Custer at the Battle of the Little Bighorn on June 25, 1876, the Army sent the 5th U.S. Infantry Regiment, under the command of Nelson A. Miles, from Nebraska to the plains of eastern Montana to establish a military fort. The order for development of the fort was signed on August 28, 1876. The Army's intended use for its garrison at the post was to reduce warfare by the American Indians in the region and to persuade them to resettle on reservations.

Colonel David S. Stanley had originally scouted the first site of the fort during the Yellowstone Expedition of 1873. He thought the location would be good for supplying troops throughout the region, but the Army did not decide to build the fort until after Custer's overwhelming defeat at the Battle of the Little Bighorn.

As developers planned to bring the Great Northern Railway to the region, the U.S. Army was assigned to survey the land and develop maps. The troops came into contact with two tribes of Indians, the Lakota (Sioux) and the Crow. The Sioux had pushed the Crow west of their traditional lands as they moved west, in response to European–American settlers encroaching on Sioux territory. Resentful of the Sioux, the Crow frequently allied with the Army and served as scouts to its expeditions.

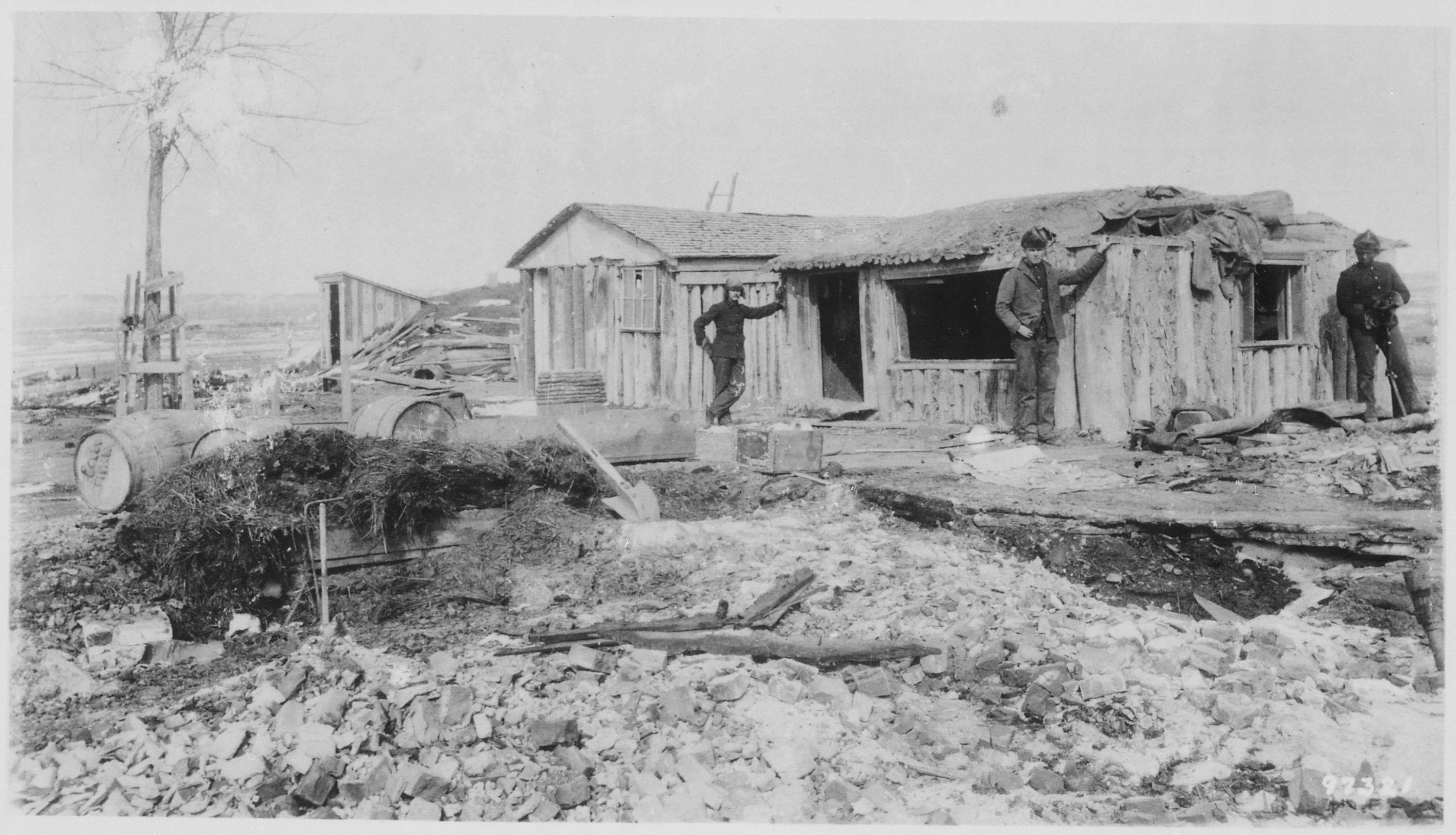
Crude building under construction at Fort Keogh, c. 1889

General Miles established the "Cantonment Tongue River" at the confluence of the north-flowing Tongue River and the east-flowing Yellowstone River. The site would provide easy access to boats bringing supplies up the Yellowstone. The original cantonment was referred to by several names during its first two years, including New Post on the Yellowstone, Cantonment on Tongue River, and Tongue River Barracks, before the Army officially named it Fort Keogh on November 8, 1878.

Miles was well-respected as a leader, not only by his troops, but also by the Indians. Promising fair treatment and better lives to the Native Americans, Miles gradually persuaded the Indian nations to settle on the reservations. Not all the nations surrendered immediately. Miles went to battle against the holdouts with his troops, including during the extreme cold of winter. The Sioux and Crow bands migrated through wide areas in the Montana Territory, and troops were engaged in battle with them hundreds of miles from the fort.

When the 5th Infantry left the fort in 1888, the 22nd Infantry Regiment (which had had several companies stationed there since 1876), took over the garrison, and the regimental headquarters with the entire regiment were moved to the post in 1888 and would remain until 1896. (Note: A website on the 22nd Infantry also offers a link to a downloadable thesis, Fort Keogh: Cutting Edge of a Culture by Josef James Warhank, that chronicles the fort's complete military history.) In 1888, Company H of the 8th U.S. Cavalry arrived to garrison at Keogh after marching from Fort Davis, New Mexico, and Company L of the 8th Cavalry joined the garrison after marching from Fort Hancock, Texas.

== Namesake ==
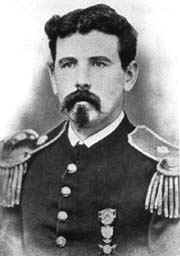
Myles Keogh

Fort Keogh was named for Myles Keogh, a Captain (brevet Lieutenant Colonel) and commander of Company I in the 7th U.S. Cavalry under Lt. Col. (brevet Major General) George Armstrong Custer, both of whom were killed in the Battle of the Little Bighorn. Born in Ireland on March 25, 1840, Keogh came from a comfortable background. Wanting adventure, Keogh left the farming to a brother and went off to war. In 1860, he went to Italy after the Pope recruited Irish men to take up the fight to save the Papal States. In those battles, he received two medals. Later Keogh joined the Papal Guard in Rome.

Keogh preferred warfare to acting as a guard; he resigned his post and in March 1862 headed to the United States to serve in the American Civil War. He was commissioned as a Captain in the Union Army and proved his ability repeatedly. He won many commendations, and his bravery in the Battle of Gettysburg under Brigadier General John Buford earned him the rank of brevet Major. Keogh took an assignment in the western wars in 1863; he served under Custer until his death in battle. Keogh stood his ground, with the company he commanded around him; they were surrounded and outnumbered by Sioux warriors. His body was later found in the center of those of his soldiers. The Army later found his horse, Comanche, walking riderless on the battlefield. Soldiers nursed the horse to health, and he became a legend.

== Town development ==
The arrival of the Army generated a demand for businesses among enterprising traders. Named after the fort's commander, Nelson A. Miles, Milestown developed first as an army town to meet the needs of young, isolated servicemen.

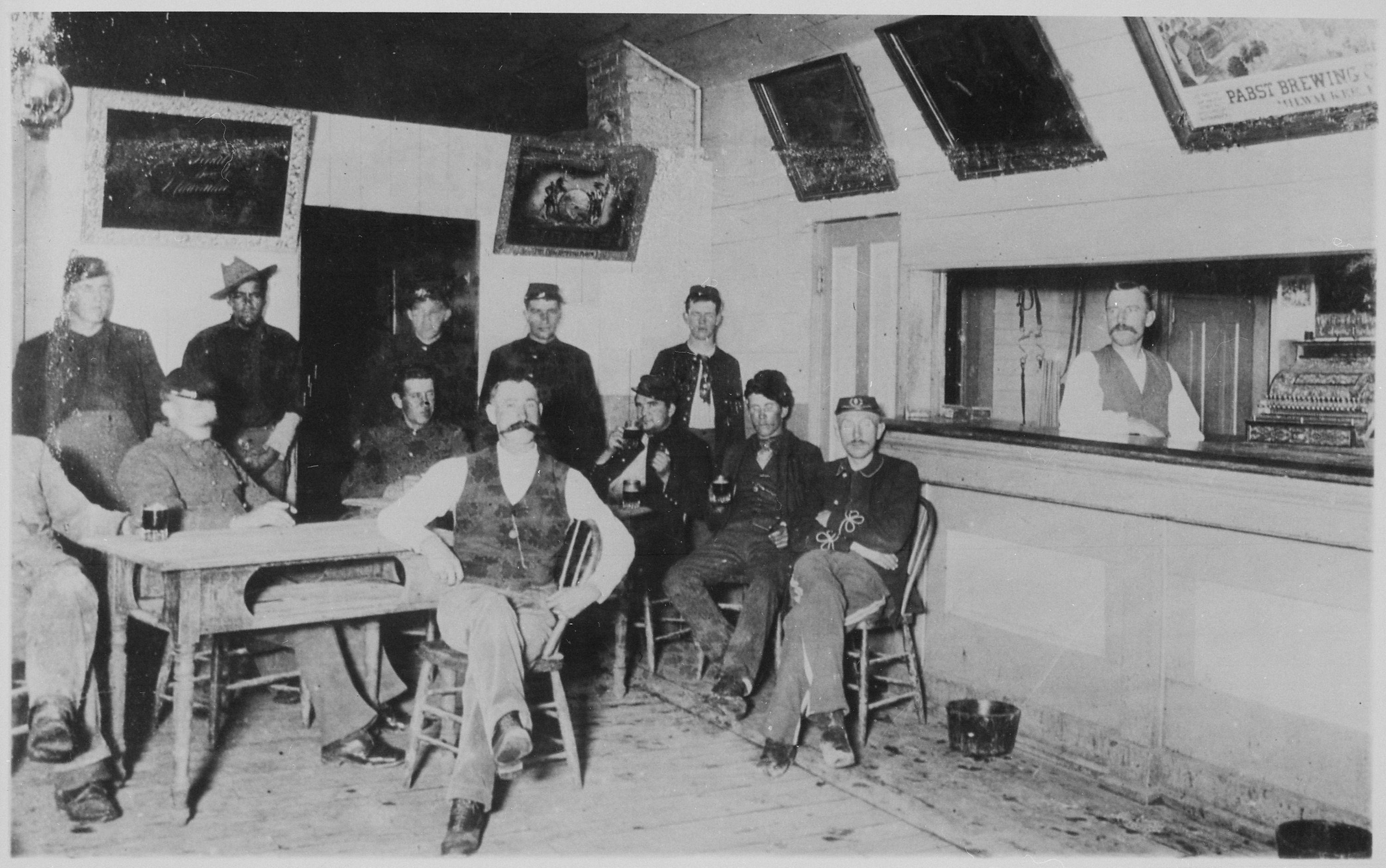
Canteen at Ft. Keogh, 1890–1894

The Miles City Chamber of Commerce website noted:

According to the diaries kept by George Miles, the nephew of the Colonel who traveled with his uncle, a man named Mat Carrol set up some barrels under a tarp and started selling whiskey. When Colonel Miles got tired of having his guard house filled to overflowing--whiskey causing him, Miles said, more trouble than the Indians--he ordered Carrol and the other purveyors of liquor to leave the military reservation.

An employee of Carrol's, one John Carter, rode east on his big bay horse until he was the required two miles (3 km) away, beyond the edge of the reservation. He found a flat spot along the Yellowstone, built a crude log hut out of driftwood and started selling whiskey. The soldiers soon found the place, other merchants followed, and Miles City was born.

Milestown was at first almost nothing but rowdy; many a drunken soldier emerged from its saloons. About a year after settling in the area, General Miles moved the fort to the present location just a couple of miles southwest of the original site. He hoped that the extra distance from the town would slow the unruliness. The town picked up and moved to its current location closer to the fort. In his book Recollections of Old Milestown, Samuel Gordon described a frontier confrontation. Riverside Park, which still stands today, was rumored to be up for the taking. The "Old West" rule was that if a man were to get four logs placed on the ground in a square, he had the foundation of a building, and could claim the land as his. One such squatter had placed two of the needed logs, and went to get the other two. A second man saw the two logs and an opportunity. He placed his two logs with the two currently on site and stood his ground there. He expected the first man to object and leave. The first squatter was dismissed by the second squatter with, "two logs counted nothing". But the first man pulled out his revolver to settle the dispute. The second man quickly abandoned his claim to the area. Late in the afternoon, tales of the incident reached the fort. Soldiers came out and sent away all the squatters in the area.

== 20th-century history ==
In 1900, the infantry and cavalry post at Fort Keogh became an army remount station. Infantry troops were withdrawn from the fort in 1907. During World War I, Fort Keogh served as a quartermaster's depot. The Fort Keogh remount station processed more horses for World War I than any other post, shipping them all over the world.

The U.S. Department of the Interior took over the Fort Keogh military reservation in 1924. As of 2012, it is home to the USDA Fort Keogh Range and Livestock Experiment Station. The Station's Line 1 Hereford Herd has played a key role in the genetic research of Hereford cattle.

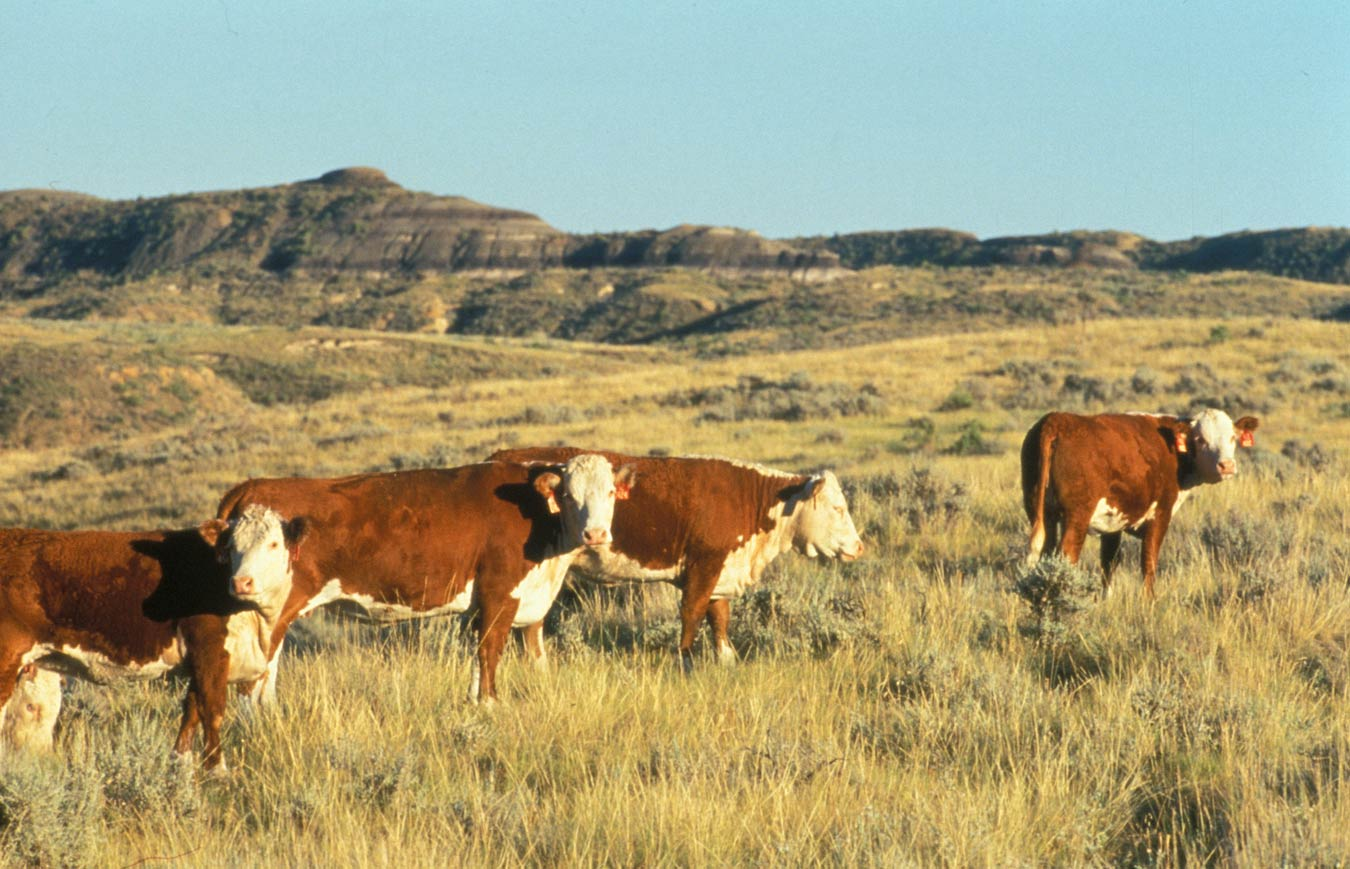
Hereford cattle at Fort Keogh Livestock and Range Research Laboratory in 2002

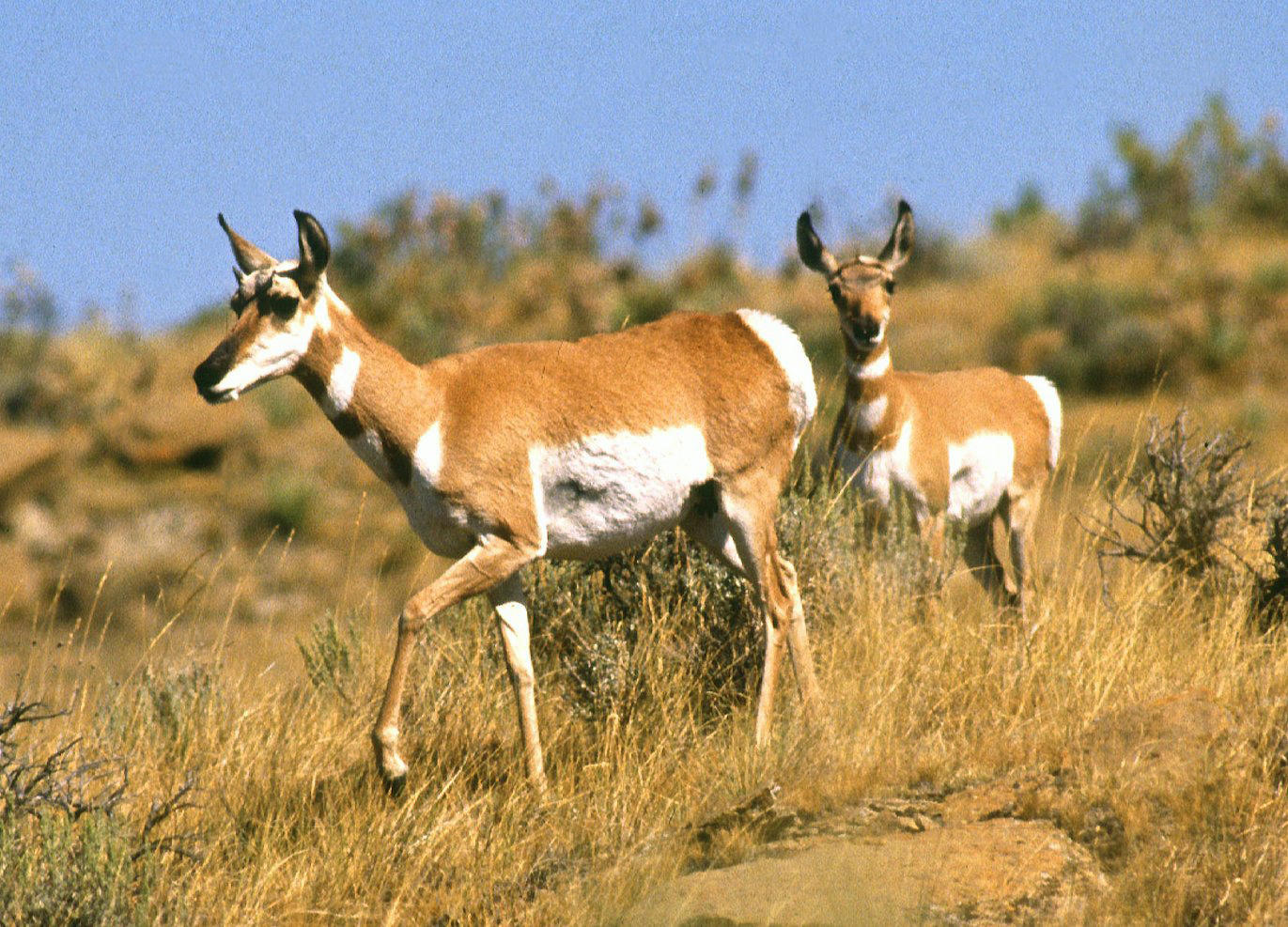
Pronghorn antelope on the Fort Keogh rangeland

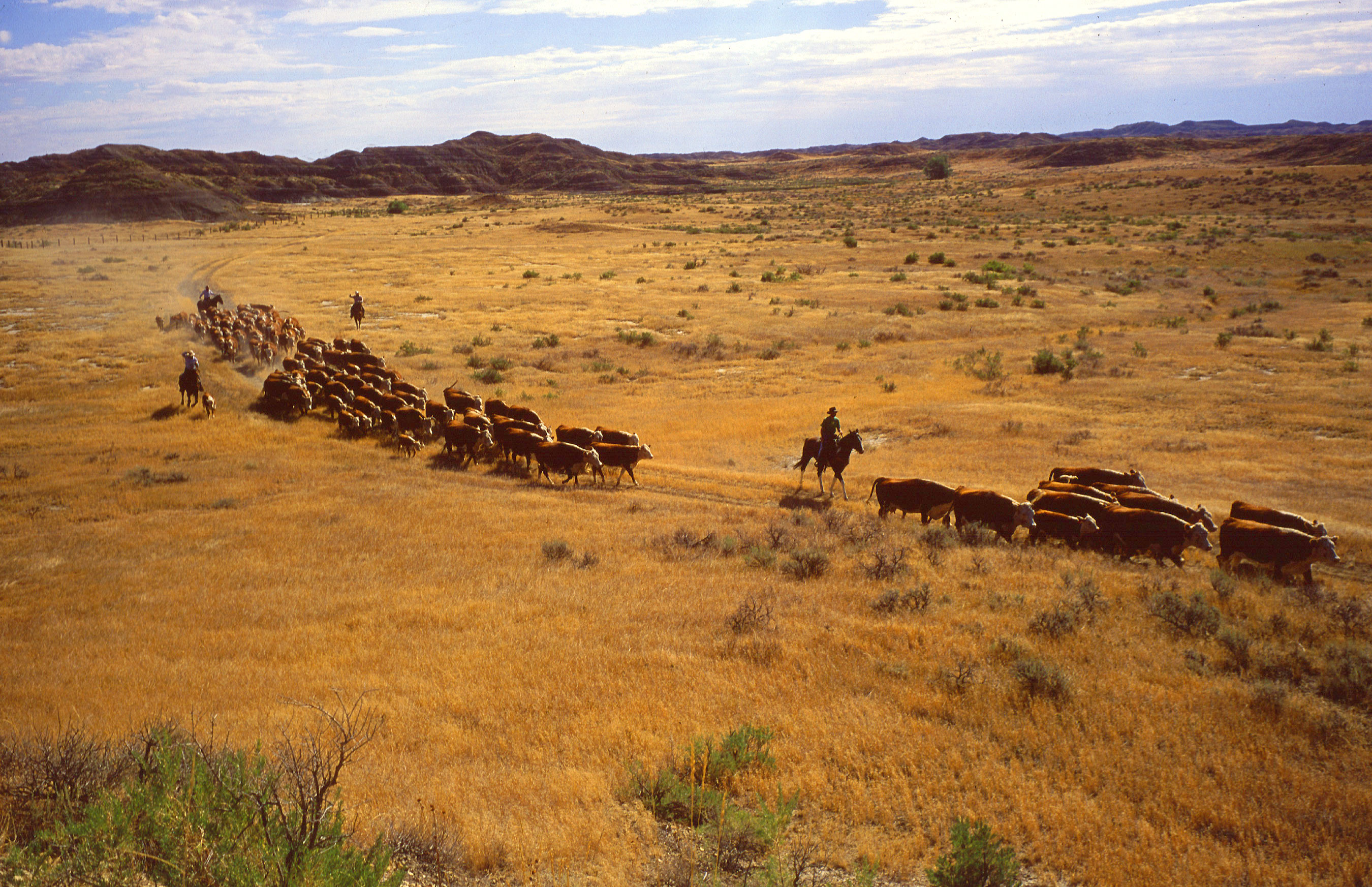
Cattle roundup at Fort Keogh Livestock and Range Research Station in 2002

By an Act of Congress dated April 15, 1924 (PL90, 43 Stat. 99) jurisdiction of the Fort Keogh Military Reservation was transferred to the U.S. Department of Agriculture for experiments in stock raising and growing of forage crops. Onsite remains of the original Fort include the parade ground, a wagon shed built in 1883, the flag pole erected in 1887, and seven other structures built prior to 1924.

The size of the original Fort Keogh Military Reservation was 100 square miles or 64,000 acres. The Fort Keogh Livestock and Range Research Laboratory now occupies about 55,357 acres. In 1878, a large piece of land east of the Tongue River was released by the Army and is now the present site of the City of Miles City. Since that time, additional land has been released for the Miles City industrial sites, Custer County fairgrounds, the warm-water fish hatchery and Spotted Eagle Recreation Area. Approximately 1,800 acres are under irrigation in the Yellowstone River Valley west of the Laboratory headquarters. About 625 acres are in cultivated crops and 1150 in irrigated pastures. The remainder of the laboratory is rough, broken badlands typical of range cattle producing areas of the Northern Great Plains.

In 1954 the United States Air Force opened the 902nd Aircraft Control and Warning station on the reservation about two miles south of the Yellowstone River and ten miles west of Miles City. This station was part of the Cold War air defense system protecting the United States in case of war with the Soviet Union. The station operated until 1968 when it was closed because of the advance of electronics in radar detection. At any given time there were in the neighborhood of 100 to 125 airmen and officers stationed at this location.

The Range Riders Museum, located on the original Fort Keogh cantonment in nearby Miles City, Montana, offers historical exhibits of the fort's days as Milestown.

== Giant snowflake ==
Guinness World Records reports that the largest natural snowflake ever recorded, measuring 15 inches (38 cm) in diameter, fell at Fort Keogh on January 28, 1887.

== Gallery ==
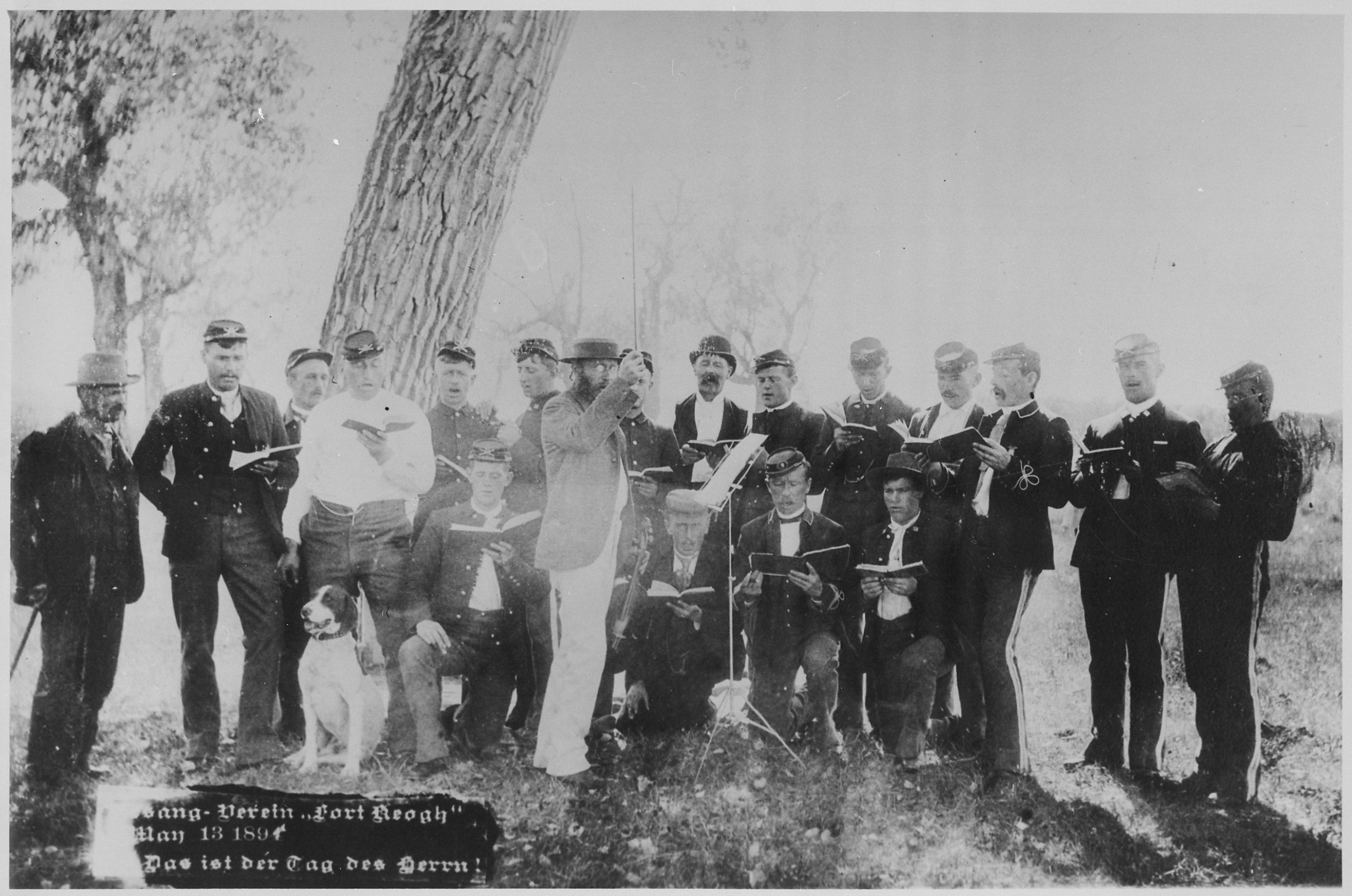
German Singing Society, 22nd Infantry, Ft. Keogh, May 13, 1894

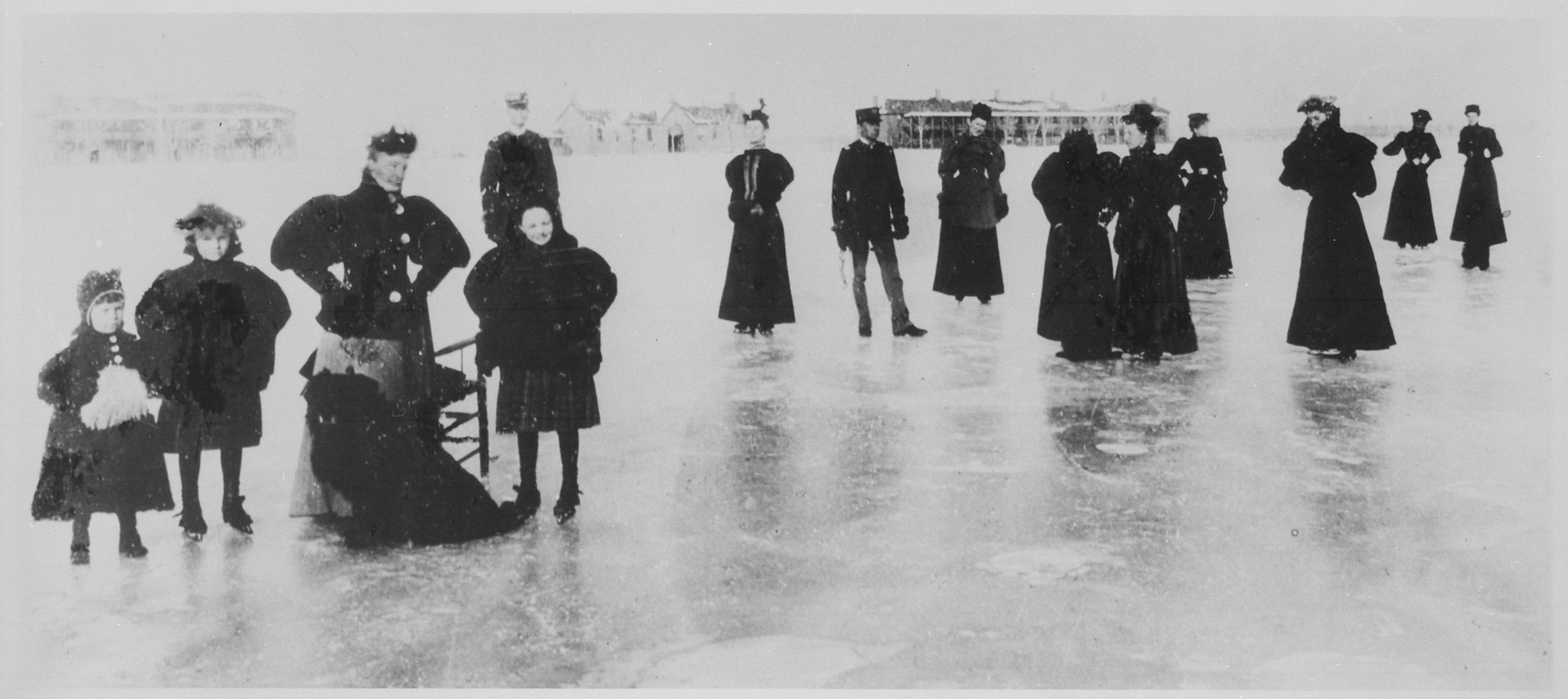
Skating party, Ft. Keogh, Mont., about 1890.

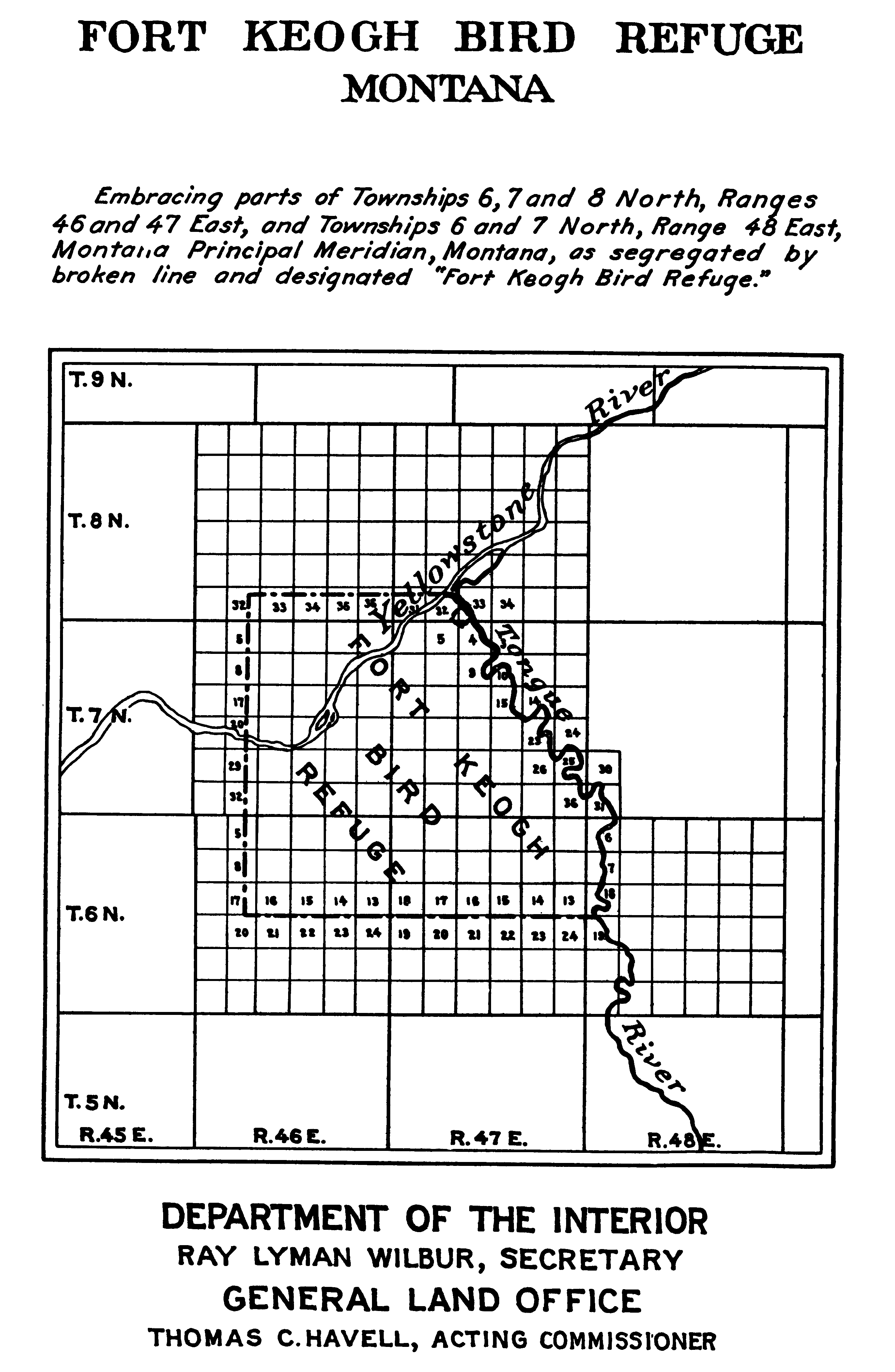
Former Fort Keogh Bird Refuge map

== See also ==
- List of military installations in Montana
