= Fort DeRussy =

Fort DeRussy may refer to one of four forts constructed in the United States between 1861 and 1900, named for René Edward De Russy or his younger brother Louis Gustave De Russy.

- Fort DeRussy (Washington, D.C.), an American Civil War-era fort built to defend Washington, D.C.
- Fort DeRussy (Hawaii), an active outpost of the U.S. Army in Honolulu, Hawaii
- Fort DeRussy (Kentucky), an American Civil War fort in Columbus, Kentucky
- Fort DeRussy (Louisiana), site of the Battle of Fort DeRussy, a small engagement in the American Civil War on March 14, 1864.
