= List of World War II military personnel educated at the United States Military Academy =

The United States Military Academy (USMA) is an undergraduate college in West Point, New York that educates and commissions officers for the United States Army. This list is drawn from alumni of the Military Academy who are veterans of World War I. This includes ... .

== World War II veterans ==
Note: "Class year" refers to the alumni's class year, which usually is the same year they graduated. However, due to the war in Europe, the Class of 1943 graduated early, in January '43, becoming the only class to do so.

Name	Class year	Notability	References
Guy Henry	1898	Major general; Spanish–American War, Philippine–American War, World War I; commander of the 3rd Cavalry Regiment; recipient of two Army Distinguished Service Medals and the Silver Star; son of Brigadier General, Medal of Honor recipient, and Puerto Rico Governor Guy Vernor Henry	
Stanley Dunbar Embick	1899	Lieutenant general; Spanish–American War, World War I; recipient of two Army Distinguished Service Medals; father-in-law of General Albert Coady Wedemeyer	
Walter K. Wilson Sr.	1902	Major general; World War I; recipient of two Army Distinguished Service Medals and Legion of Merit; father of Walter K. Wilson Jr.	
Douglas MacArthur	1903	General of the Army, Field Marshal in the Philippine Army; United States occupation of Veracruz; Second Battle of the Marne, Battle of Saint-Mihiel, Meuse-Argonne Offensive during World War I; commander of the 42nd Infantry Division; Superintendent of the United States Military Academy (1919–22); brigade commander in the Philippine Division; commander of the Philippine Department; Chief of Staff of the United States Army (1930–35); recipient of the Medal of Honor for actions during the Battle of Bataan, commander of the South West Pacific Area during World War II; Supreme Commander of the Allied Powers during the Occupation of Japan; Korean War; grandson of Wisconsin Governor Arthur MacArthur, Sr.; son of Lieutenant General and Medal of Honor recipient Arthur MacArthur, Jr.	
Henry Conger Pratt	1904	Major general; World War I; aide to William Howard Taft; commander of Brooks Field, Kelly Field, and Mitchel Field; Commandant of the Air Corps Tactical School; commander of the Philippine Division; commander of Fort William McKinley; commander of the Southern Defense Command and Western Defense Command; recipient of the Army Distinguished Service Medal	
Joseph Stilwell	1904	General; described Academy hazing as "hell"; U.S. Fourth Corps intelligence officer and helped plan the St. Mihiel offensive during World War I; commander of American forces in the China Burma India Theater in World War II	
Frank Maxwell Andrews	1906	Lieutenant general; commanded airfields in America during World War I, staff of Army of Occupation in Germany after the war; commander of the 1st Pursuit Group; commander of the General Headquarters Air Force and Panama Canal Air Force; commander of the Caribbean Defense Command; commander of the U.S. Army Forces in the Middle East; commander of U.S. forces of the European Theater of Operations; Joint Base Andrews Naval Air Facility, Andrews Air Force Base, and RAF Andrews Field are named for him	
Rene Edward De Russy Hoyle	1906	Major general; commander of the 9th Infantry Division; son of Brigadier General Eli D. Hoyle; grandson of Brigadier General René Edward De Russy	
Henry H. "Hap" Arnold	1907	General of the Army, General of the Air Force; Second rated pilot in the United States Army Air Corps; executive officer of the aviation section at Army headquarters in Washington D.C. during World War I; World War II; commander of the United States Army Command and General Staff College; commander of March Field; commander of the United States Army Air Forces; founder of the RAND Corporation; Arnold Air Force Base, Arnold Engineering Development Center, and Arnold Air Society are named for him	
Simon Bolivar Buckner, Jr.	1908	General; World War I; Battle of Dutch Harbor, killed at the Battle of Okinawa; commander of the Alaska Defense Command; commander of the Tenth United States Army; son of Kentucky Governor and Confederate State Lieutenant General Simon Bolivar Buckner	
Jacob L. Devers	1909	General; Operation Dragoon, Operation Overlord, Operation Varsity; commander of the 9th Infantry Division; commander of the Sixth United States Army Group	
Robert L. Eichelberger	1909	General; American Expeditionary Force Siberia; Superintendent of the Academy (1940–42); commanded Eighth United States Army in World War II	
Delos Carleton Emmons	1909	Lieutenant general; company commander in the 30th Infantry Regiment; commander of the Western Defense Command; commandant of the Armed Forces Staff College	
George S. Patton	1909	General; 1912 Summer Olympics, modern pentathlon, 5th place; Pancho Villa Expedition; World War II; Battle of Saint-Mihiel, Meuse-Argonne Offensive; commander of the 1st Tank Brigade/304th Tank Brigade; commander of the 3rd Cavalry Regiment; commander of the 2nd Armored Division; commander of the II Corps; commander of the Seventh United States Army, Third United States Army, and Fifteenth United States Army during World War II; descendant of Brigadier General Hugh Mercer; father of Major General George Patton IV; Patton series of tanks were named for him	
Oscar Griswold	1910	Lieutenant general; World War I; Solomon Islands campaign, Bougainville campaign, Philippines campaign (1944-45); commander of the 29th Infantry Regiment and 4th Infantry Regiment; commander of the XIV Corps; commander of the Seventh United States Army and the Third United States Army; recipient of two Army Distinguished Service Medals, Navy Distinguished Service Medal, and two Silver Stars	
Stephen J. Chamberlin	1912	Lieutenant general; World War I; commander of the Fifth Army; recipient of the Navy Cross, the Army Distinguished Service Medal, and the Silver Star	
Carl Andrew Spaatz	1914	General; Pancho Villa Expedition; flight instructor and fighter pilot in World War I; Eighth Air Force commander in World War II; first Chief of Staff of the United States Air Force (1947–48)	
Omar Bradley	1915	General of the Army; stationed in America during World War I; commander of the 82nd Infantry Division and 28th Infantry Division in non-combat areas prior to being assigned to combat in Operation Torch, Normandy Landings, Operation Cobra, Battle of the Bulge, commander of the First United States Army, commander of the Twelfth United States Army Group; Korean War; first Chairman of the Joint Chiefs of Staff; Administrator of the Veterans Administration; Chairman of the NATO Military Committee; Bradley Fighting Vehicle named for him	
Donald Angus Davison	1915	Major general; North African Campaign; Davison Army Airfield is named for him	
Dwight D. Eisenhower	1915	General of the Army; trained tank crews in Pennsylvania during World War I; World War II; commander of European Theater of Operations and Supreme Headquarters Allied Expeditionary Force (1942–45); 1st Military Governor of American Occupation Zone in Germany (1945); President of Columbia University (1948–50, 1952–53); 1st Supreme Allied Commander Europe (1951–52); 34th President of the United States (1953–61)	
Luis R. Esteves	1915	Major general; first Hispanic graduate of the Academy; Pancho Villa Expedition; mayor and judge of Polvo, Mexico; commander of the 23rd Battalion, which was composed of Puerto Ricans and stationed in Panama during World War I; commander of 92nd Infantry Brigade Combat Team during World War II; founder of the Puerto Rico National Guard	
Thomas B. Larkin	1915	Lieutenant general; reconnaissance officer during Second Battle of the Marne; Tunisia Campaign in World War II; Quartermaster General (1946–49)	
Dwight Johns	1916	Brigadier general; World War I, Pancho Villa Expedition; recipients of the Army Distinguished Service Medal	
Mark W. Clark	1917	General; World War I, Korean War; Operation Torch, Battle of Monte Cassino; commander of the II Corps; commander of the Fifth United States Army; commander of the 15th Army Group; commander of the United Nations Command; President of The Citadel, The Military College of South Carolina	
J. Lawton Collins	1917	General; Invasion of Normandy, Operation Cobra; Chief of Staff of the VII Corps; Chief of Staff of the Hawaiian Department; commander of the 25th Infantry Division	
Norman Cota	1917	Major general; Operation Torch, Allied invasion of Sicily, Normandy Landings, Battle of Hürtgen Forest; commander of the 28th Infantry Division	
George Douglas Wahl	1917	Brigadier general; son of Major General Lutz Wahl	
Hugh John Casey	1918	Major general; instructor and engineer company commander during World War I; Chief Engineer for General of the Army Douglas MacArthur for the South West Pacific theatre of World War II; initial designer of The Pentagon; father of Major Hugh Boyd Casey; father-in-law of Major General Frank Butner Clay	
Lucius D. Clay	1918	General; Military Governor of Allied-occupied Germany; son of U.S. Senator Alexander S. Clay; father of Major General Frank Butner Clay and Air Force General Lucius D. Clay, Jr.	
Willard Ames Holbrook, Jr.	1918	Brigadier general; commander of the 12th Armored Division; son of Major General Willard Ames Holbrook; nephew of Major General Lucius Roy Holbrook; grandson of Major General David S. Stanley; grandson-in-law of Brigadier General Eli D. Hoyle; great-grandson-in-law of Brigadier General René Edward De Russy	
William M. Miley	1918	Major general; World War I; commander of the 503rd Parachute Infantry Regiment; commander of the 17th Airborne Division and 11th Airborne Division; recipient of the Silver Star and two Army Distinguished Service Medals	
Nathan Farragut Twining	1919	General; Pancho Villa Expedition; commander of the Thirteenth Air Force, Fifteenth Air Force, and Twentieth Air Force; commander of the Air Material Command and the Alaskan Air Command; Air Force Chief of Staff; Chairman of the Joint Chiefs of Staff; recipient of the Army Distinguished Service Medal and the Navy Distinguished Service Medal	
Arthur L. McCullough	1920	Brigadier general; Allied invasion of Sicily; commander of the 514th Troop Carrier Wing and 313th Trooper Carrier Wing; recipient of the Legion of Merit	
Hugo P. Rush	1920	Major general; commander of the 44th Bombardment Group and the 98th Bombardment Group; commander of the 15th Wing, 47th Bombardment Wing, 17th Bomb Operational Training Wing, and 301st Fighter Wing; commander of the VIII Bomber Command; commander of Keesler Field; recipient of the Distinguished Service Medal, the Silver Star, and the Legion of Merit	
Hoyt Vandenberg	1923	General; commander of the 90th Attack Squadron; commander of the Twelfth Air Force and the Ninth Air Force; Director of Central Intelligence; Air Force Chief of Staff; recipient of two Army Distinguished Service Medals and the Silver Star; Vandenberg Air Force Base is named for him; the Navy vessel USNS General Hoyt S. Vandenberg (T-AGM-10) was named for him; father of Major General Hoyt S. Vandenberg, Jr.; nephew of U.S. Senator Arthur H. Vandenberg	
Lawrence Russell Dewey	1924	Major general; Korean War; troop commander; Chief of Staff of the 1st Armored Division and the IX Corps; recipient of the Silver Star, the Legion of Merit, and the Bronze Star Medal	
Monro MacCloskey	1924	Brigadier general; commander of the 885th Bombardment Squadron; commander of the 2641st Special Group; commander of the 28th Air Division; recipient of the Silver Star and the Legion of Merit; son of Brigadier General Manus MacCloskey	
Mickey Marcus	1924	Colonel (USA) and Israeli Army Major General (Aluf); lawyer; World War II civil affairs officer, parachuted into the Battle of Normandy, helped draw up the surrender terms for Italy and Germany and became part of the occupation government in Berlin; portrayed by Kirk Douglas in Cast a Giant Shadow; organized, trained, and led Israeli forces during the 1948 Arab–Israeli War, killed by friendly fire in 1948 in Israel	
James Roy Andersen	1926	Brigadier general; Andersen Air Force Base is named for him	
Herbert W. Ehrgott	1926	Brigadier general; recipient of the Legion of Merit	
Ralph Wise Zwicker	1927	Major general; Normandy landings; commander of the 38th Infantry Regiment and 18th Infantry Regiment; commander of Camp Kilmer; commander of the 24th Infantry Division and 1st Cavalry Division; commander of the XX Corps; recipient of the Silver Star	
Charles F. Born	1928	Major general; commander of the 50th Observation Squadron; commander of the Antilles Air Command; commander of the Second Air Force and Fifteenth Air Force; recipient of the Air Force Distinguished Service Medal and Legion of Merit	
Howard G. Bunker	1928	Major general; recipient of the Legion of Merit	
Robert T. Frederick	1928	Major general; Operation Dragoon; commander of the Devil's Brigade; commander of the 1st Airborne Task Force; commander of the 45th Infantry Division, 4th Infantry Division, and 6th Infantry Division	
John S. Mills	1928	Major general; recipient of the Distinguished Service Medal, the Silver Star, and the Legion of Merit	
Harold Huntley Bassett	1929	Major general; commander of the U.S. Air Force Security Service and the Air Weather Service; commander of the United States Taiwan Defense Command; recipient of the Legion of Merit	
James M. Gavin	1929	Lieutenant general; Korean War; Allied invasion of Sicily, Operation Overlord, Operation Market Garden; company commander in the 7th Infantry Regiment and the 503rd Parachute Infantry Battalion; commander of the 505th Parachute Infantry Regiment; U.S. Ambassador to France; the Gavin Power Plant in Cheshire, Ohio is named for him	
Marshall S. Roth	1929	Major general; commander of the 375th Troop Carrier Group and 317th Troop Carrier Group; recipient of the Legion of Merit	
Hamilton H. Howze	1930	General; commander of the 1st Armored Division and 82nd Airborne Division; commander of the XVIII Airborne Corps; commander of the Third United States Army and Eighth United States Army; recipient of the Army Distinguished Service Medal and the Silver Star; son of Major General Robert Lee Howze	
Phillips Waller Smith	1930	Major general; recipient of the Legion of Merit	
Gordon Blake	1931	Lieutenant general; commander of the U.S. Air Force Security Service; Chief of Staff of the Pacific Air Forces; Director of the National Security Agency	
David William Hutchison	1931	Major general; Battle of Biak, Battle of Leyte, Battle of Luzon; commander of the 308th Bombardment Wing and 97th Bombardment Wing; commander of the 314th Air Division, 21st Air Division, and the 5th Air Division; commander of the Seventeenth Air Force and Ninth Air Force; recipient of the Distinguished Service Medal and Silver Star	
William Orlando Darby	1933	Brigadier general; killed during the Italian Campaign; Camp Darby is named for him	
Arno H. Luehman	1934	Major general; Chief of Staff of Operations of the Third Air Force; Chief of Staff of the Thirteenth Air Force; Commandant of the Air War College	
Thomas Cebern Musgrave, Jr.	1935	Major general; commander of the 47th Air Division and 7th Air Division; Director of Manpower and Organization; recipient of the Legion of Merit	
Robert M. Stillman	1935	Major general; commander of the 322d Bombardment Group; commander of Stewart Field; commander of Lackland Military Training Center; commander of 313th Air Division; prisoner of war; Commandant of Cadets at United States Air Force Academy; recipient of the Silver Star; recipient of the Legion of Merit; recipient of the Bronze Star Medal; recipient of the Purple Heart	
Chester Victor Clifton, Jr.	1936	Major general; recipient of the Army Distinguished Service Medal; senior military aide to John F. Kennedy and Lyndon B. Johnson	
Benjamin O. Davis Jr.	1936	General; Korean War; commander of the 99th Pursuit Squadron; commander of the 51st Fighter-Interceptor Wing; Chief of Staff of the Twelfth Air Force and Thirteenth Air Force; son of Brigadier General Benjamin O. Davis Sr.	
Richard W. Fellows	1937	Brigadier general; Philippines Campaign; commander of the 30th Bombardment Group and 376th Bombardment Group; commander of Pepperrell Air Force Base and Ernest Harmon Air Force Base; recipient of the Silver Star	
John S. Samuel	1939	Major general; Invasion of Normandy, Allied advance from Paris to the Rhine, Battle of the Bulge, Western Allied invasion of Germany; commander of the 322d Bombardment Group; commander of Carswell Air Force Base; commander of the 816th Air Division; Director of the U.S. Air Force Office of Special Investigations; recipient of the Distinguished Service Medal, the Silver Star, and the Legion of Merit	
Donald V. Bennett	1940	General; Normandy Landings; Superintendent of the United States Military Academy; Director of the Defense Intelligence Agency; commander of the United States Army Pacific	
Fred Ascani	1941	Major general; squadron commander in the 483rd Bomb Group; commander of the 86th Fighter Interceptor Group; commander of the 50th Fighter Bomber Wing	
William C. Gribble, Jr.	1941	Lieutenant general; battalion commander in the 43rd Infantry Division; Chief of Engineers; recipient of two Army Distinguished Service Medals	
Robin Olds	1943	Brigadier general; Vietnam War; group commander in the 86th Fighter-Interceptor Wing; commander of the No. 1 Squadron RAF and 434th Fighter Squadron; commander of the 81st Tactical Wing and the 8th Tactical Fighter Wing; recipient of the Air Force Cross, two Air Force Distinguished Service Medals, and four Silver Stars; son of Major General Robert Olds	

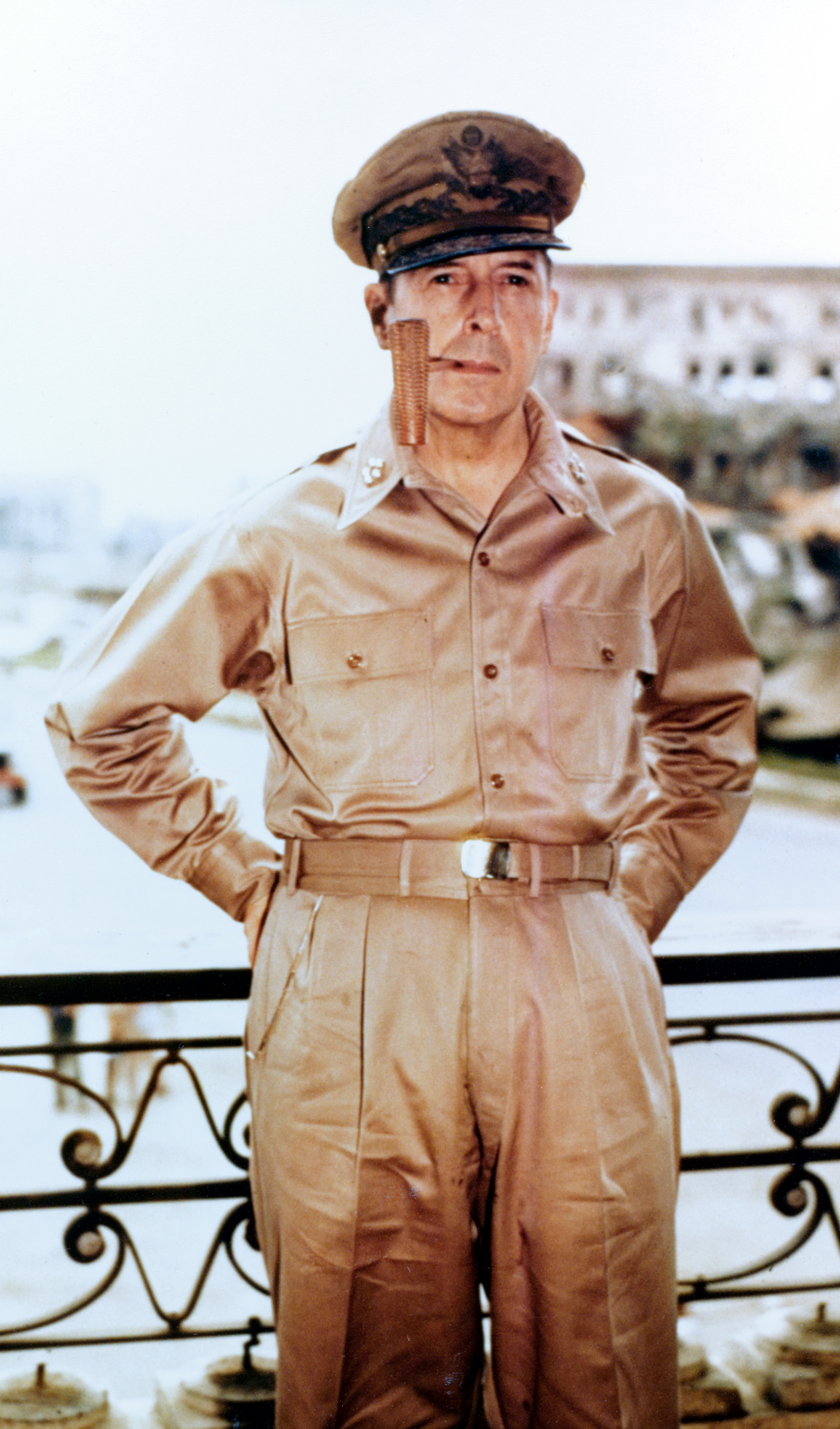
Douglas MacArthur (1903)

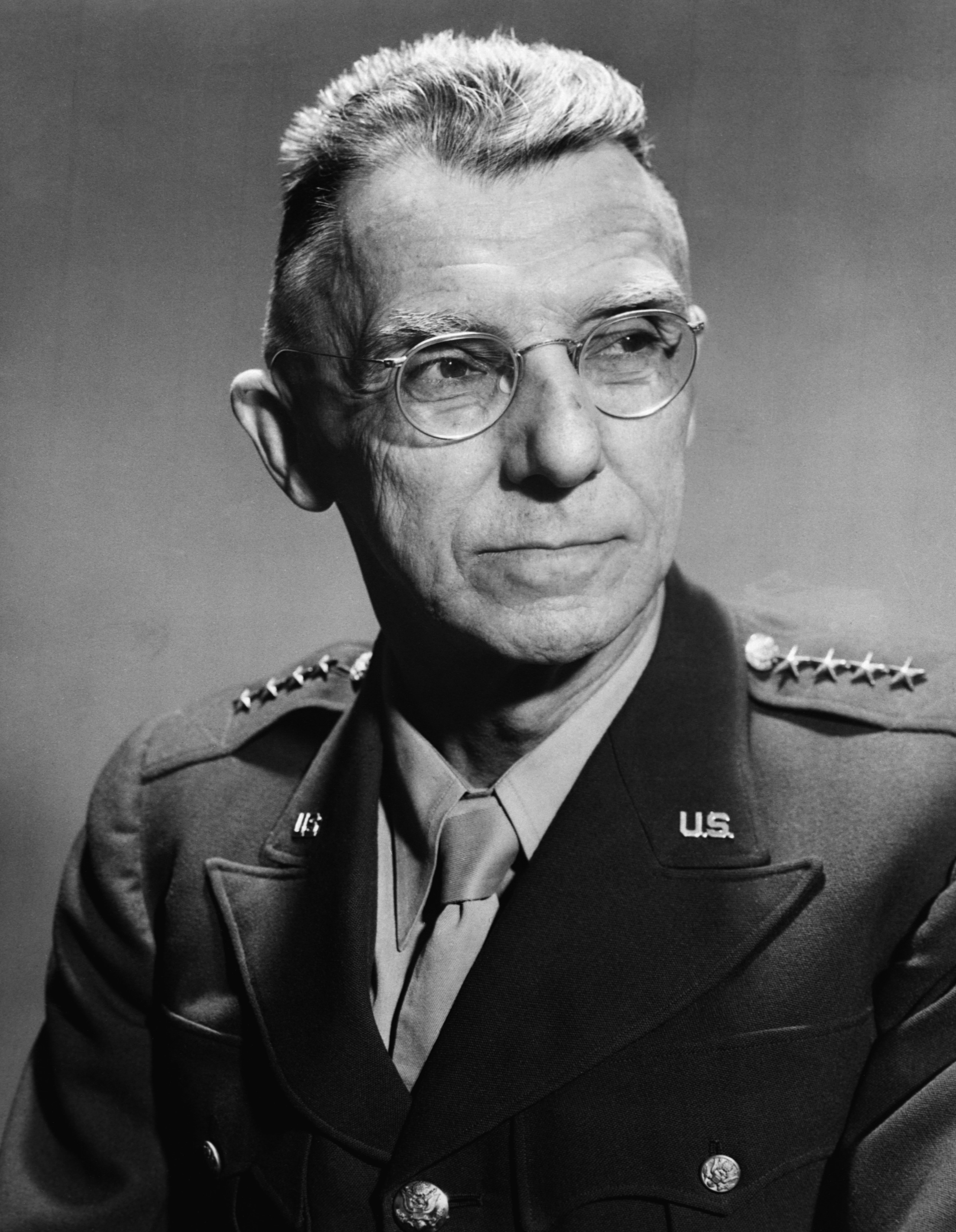
Joseph Stilwell (1904)

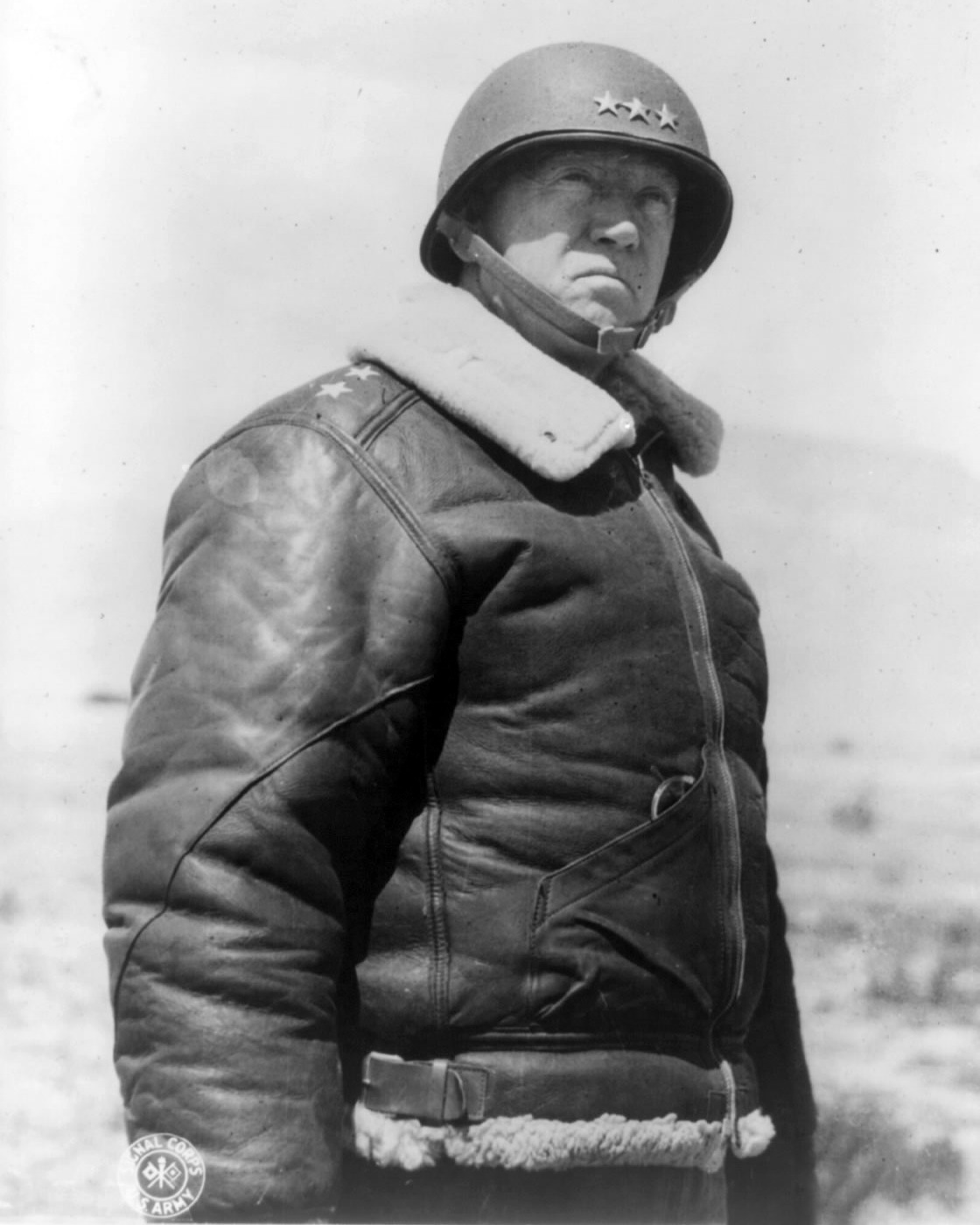
George S. Patton (1909)

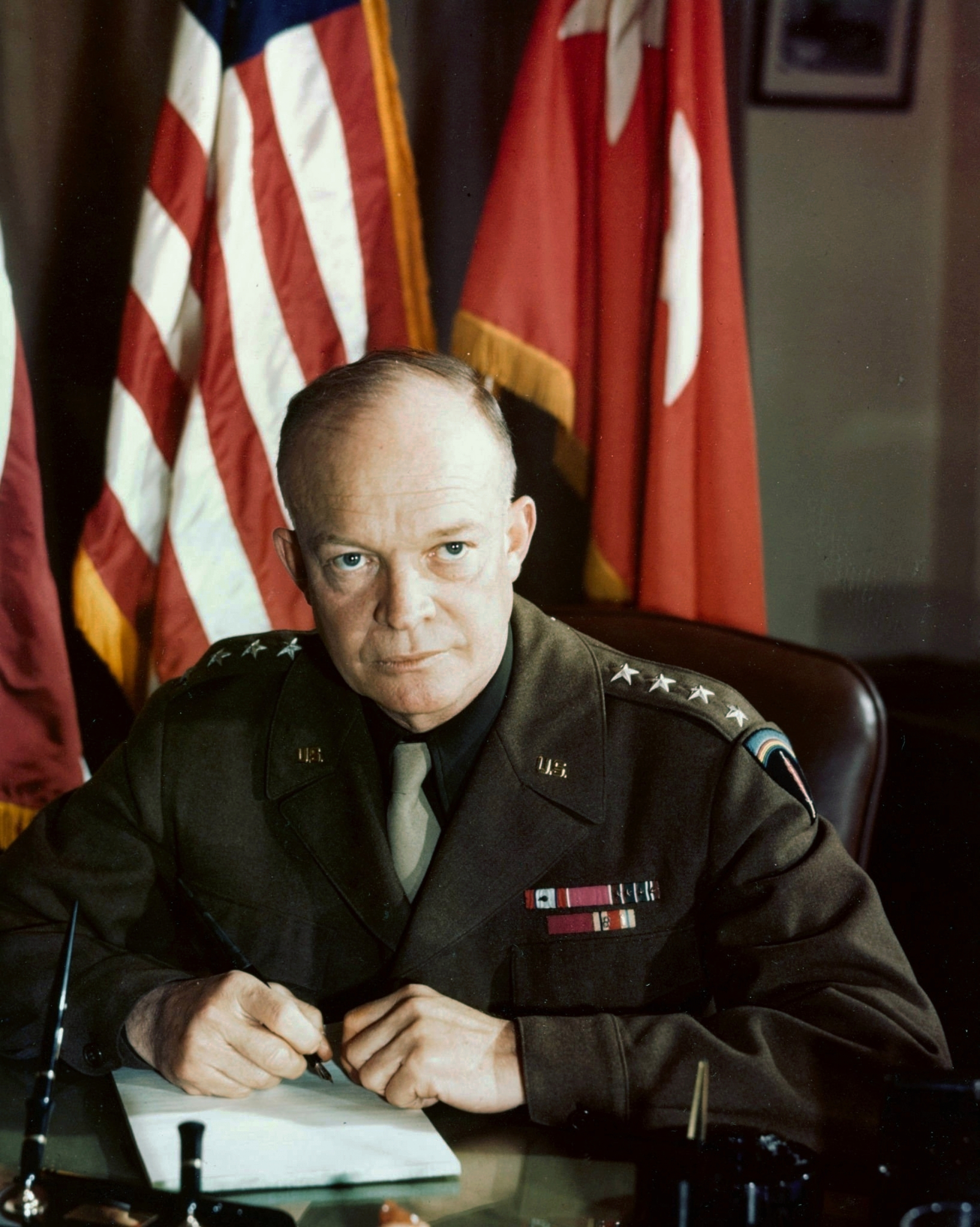
Dwight D. Eisenhower (1915)

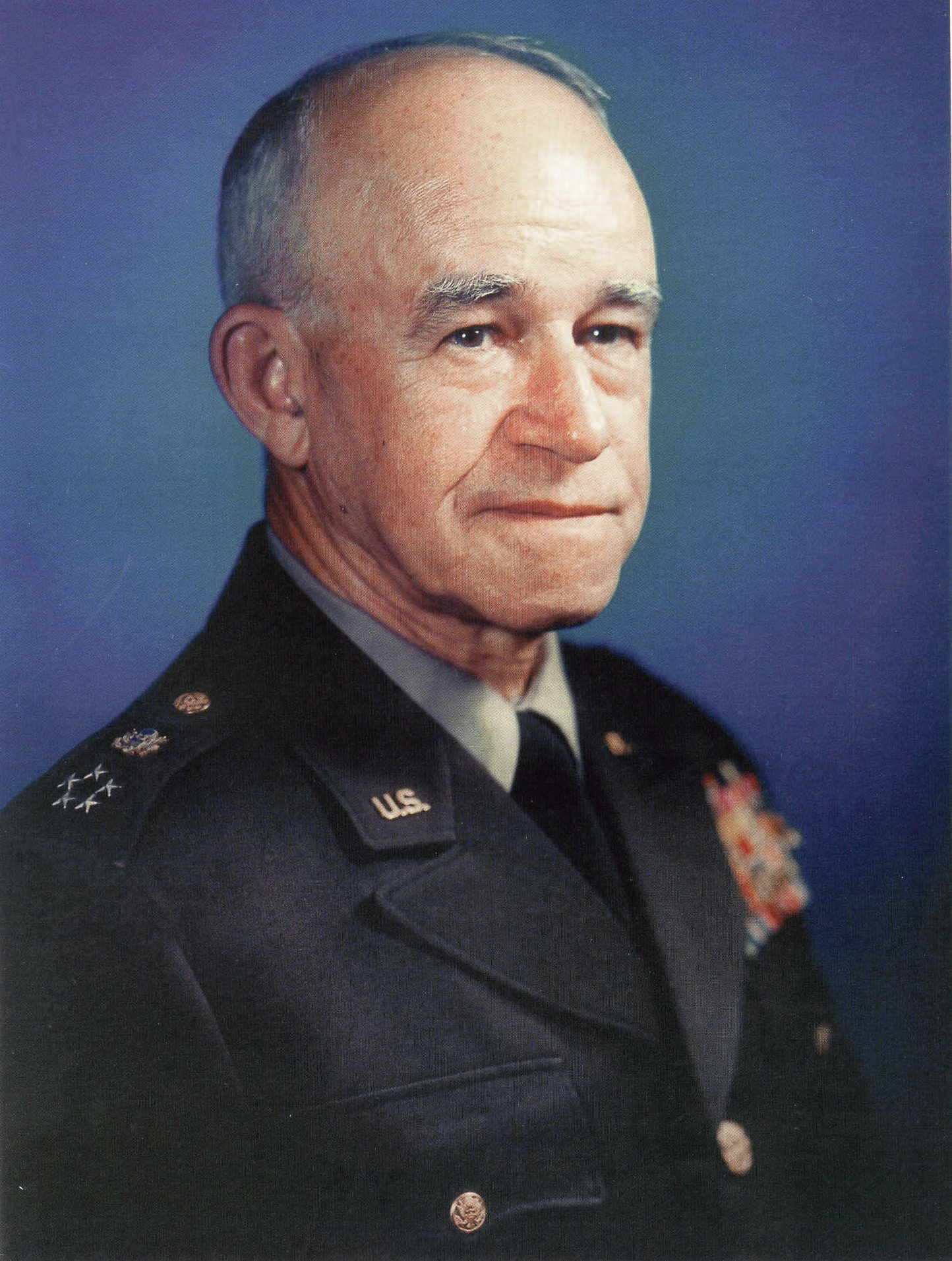
Omar Bradley (1915)

- Arthur F. Gorham, Class of 1938, First Commander of the 1/505th PIR, 82nd Airborne.
- Ulysses S. Grant III, Class of 1903. Major General; Head of Protection Branch, Office of Civilian Defense
- Leslie Groves, Class of 1918
- Alfred Gruenther, Class of 1919
- Hubert R. Harmon, Class of 1915
- Albert Hawkins, Class of 1917
- William M. Hoge, Class of 1916
- Geoffrey Keyes, Class of 1913
- John C. H. Lee, Class of 1909
- Lyman Lemnitzer, Class of 1920
- Herbert B. Loper, Class of 1919
- John P. Lucas, Class of 1911
- Vicente Lim, Class of 1914, served under Douglas MacArthur, general Philippine Scouts
- Anthony McAuliffe, Class of 1918
- John P. McConnell, Class of 1932
- Horace L. McBride, Class of 1916, Commander of the 80th Infantry Division
- Lesley J. McNair, Class of 1904
- Joseph T. McNarney, Class of 1915
- Frank Merrill, Class of 1929
- Virgil R. Miller, Class of 1924. Regimental Commander of the 442d Regimental Combat Team
- James Edward Moore, Class of 1924
- Otto L. Nelson, Jr., Class of 1924
- Andrew P. O'Meara, Class of 1930
- Alexander Patch, Class of 1913
- Matthew Ridgway, Class of 1917.
- Edward Rowny, Class of 1941
- John Dale Ryan, Class of 1938
- Antulio Segarra, Class of 1927
- William Hood Simpson, Class of 1909
- Brehon B. Somervell, Class of 1914
- Daniel Isom Sultan, Class of 1907
- Maxwell D. Taylor, Class of 1922
- Thomas J. H. Trapnell, Class of 1927
- William H. Tunner, Class of 1928
- George V. Underwood, Jr., Class 1937
- James Van Fleet, Class of 1915
- Jonathan Wainwright, Class of 1906
- Walton Walker, Class of 1912
- Albert Coady Wedemeyer, Class of 1919
- Raymond Albert Wheeler, Class of 1911
  - Major general in United States Army Corps of Engineers developing a transportation network in the Middle East to ship munitions to the Soviet Union (1942–1943); South East Asia Command on the staff of Admiral Lord Louis Mountbatten, Supreme Allied Commander South East Asia, where duties including directing construction of the Ledo Road (1943–1944); Lieutenant general and Deputy Supreme Allied Commander South East Asia (1944–1945), during which he was the U.S. representative accepting the Japanese surrender in Singapore. Immediately after the war, became the Army Corps of Engineers' overall Chief of Engineers.
- Thomas D. White, Class of 1920
  - assistant chief of staff for operations, and then chief of staff, of the Third Air Force at MacDill Field, Florida,(1942–1943); assistant chief of air staff for intelligence Army Air Forces Headquarters at The Pentagon, Virginia (January to August 1944); deputy commander of the Thirteenth Air Force in the Southwest Pacific, taking part in the campaigns of New Guinea, Southern Philippines and Borneo; assumed command of the Seventh Air Force, which had based its headquarters in the Marianas and immediately moved with it to the recently taken Okinawa (June 1945 to beyond war's end). Would later be the Chief of Staff of the United States Air Force.
- Walter K. Wilson Jr., Class of 1929
  - during WWII was a Lieutenant colonel in Army Corps of Engineers, Deputy Engineer-in-Chief with the South East Asia Command (1943–1945); Commanding General, Advance Section, U.S. Forces, China Burma India Theater, and Chief of Staff of X Force (the Chinese Army in India) (1945). Would later be the Army Corps of Engineers' overall Chief of Engineers.
