= General Murray =

General Murray may refer to:

== United Kingdom ==
- Alexander Murray (British Army officer, died 1762) (ca. 1715–1762), British Army general
- Archibald Murray (1860–1945), British Army general
- Freeman Murray (1804–1885), British Army general
- George Murray (British Army officer) (1772–1846), British Army major general
- Lord George Murray (general) (1694-1760), Scottish Jacobite Army lieutenant general
- Henry Murray (British Army officer) (1784–1860), British Army general
- Horatius Murray (1903–1989), British Army general
- James Murray (British Army officer, born 1721) (1721–1794), British Army general
- James Murray, 1st Baron Glenlyon (1782–1837), British Army lieutenant general
- James Patrick Murray (British Army officer) (1782–1834), British Army major general
- James Wolfe Murray (1853–1919), British Army lieutenant general
- John Murray, 2nd Earl of Dunmore (1685–1752), British Army general
- Lord John Murray (1711–1787), British Army general
- Sir John Murray, 8th Baronet (c. 1768–1827), British Army general
- John Irvine Murray (1826–1902), British Indian Army general
- Robert Murray (British Army officer, born 1689) (1689–1738), British Army brigadier general
- Thomas Murray (British Army officer, died 1764) (1698–1764), British Army lieutenant general
- Thomas Murray (British Army officer, died 1816), British Army general

== United States ==
- Arthur Murray (United States Army officer) (1851–1925), U.S. Army major general
- Charles I. Murray (1896–1977), U.S. Marine Corps brigadier general
- James Lore Murray (1919–2004), U.S. Air Force major general
- John B. Murray (general) (1822–1884), U.S. Volunteers brevet brigadier general in the American Civil War
- John E. Murray (1918-2008), U.S. Army major general
- John M. Murray (born 1960), U.S. Army general
- Maxwell Murray (1885–1948), U.S. Army major general
- Raymond Murray (1913–2004), U.S. Marine Corps major general
- Robert Murray (physician) (1822–1913), U.S. Army brigadier general

== Other ==
- John Murray (Australian Army general) (1892–1951), Australian Army major general
- Sir Joseph Murray, 3rd Baronet (1718–1802), Austrian Imperial Army general
- Joseph Albert Murray (1774–1848), Austrian Imperial Army major general and son of Sir Joseph Murray, 3rd Baronet
- Malcolm Murray (Swedish Army officer) (1904–1995), Swedish Army lieutenant general

== See also ==
- David Murray-Lyon (1890–1975), British Indian Army major general
- Evan Murray-Macgregor (1785–1841), British Army major general
- Attorney General Murray (disambiguation)
