= 2nd Louisiana Infantry Regiment (Confederate) =

Infantry regiment of the Confederate States Army

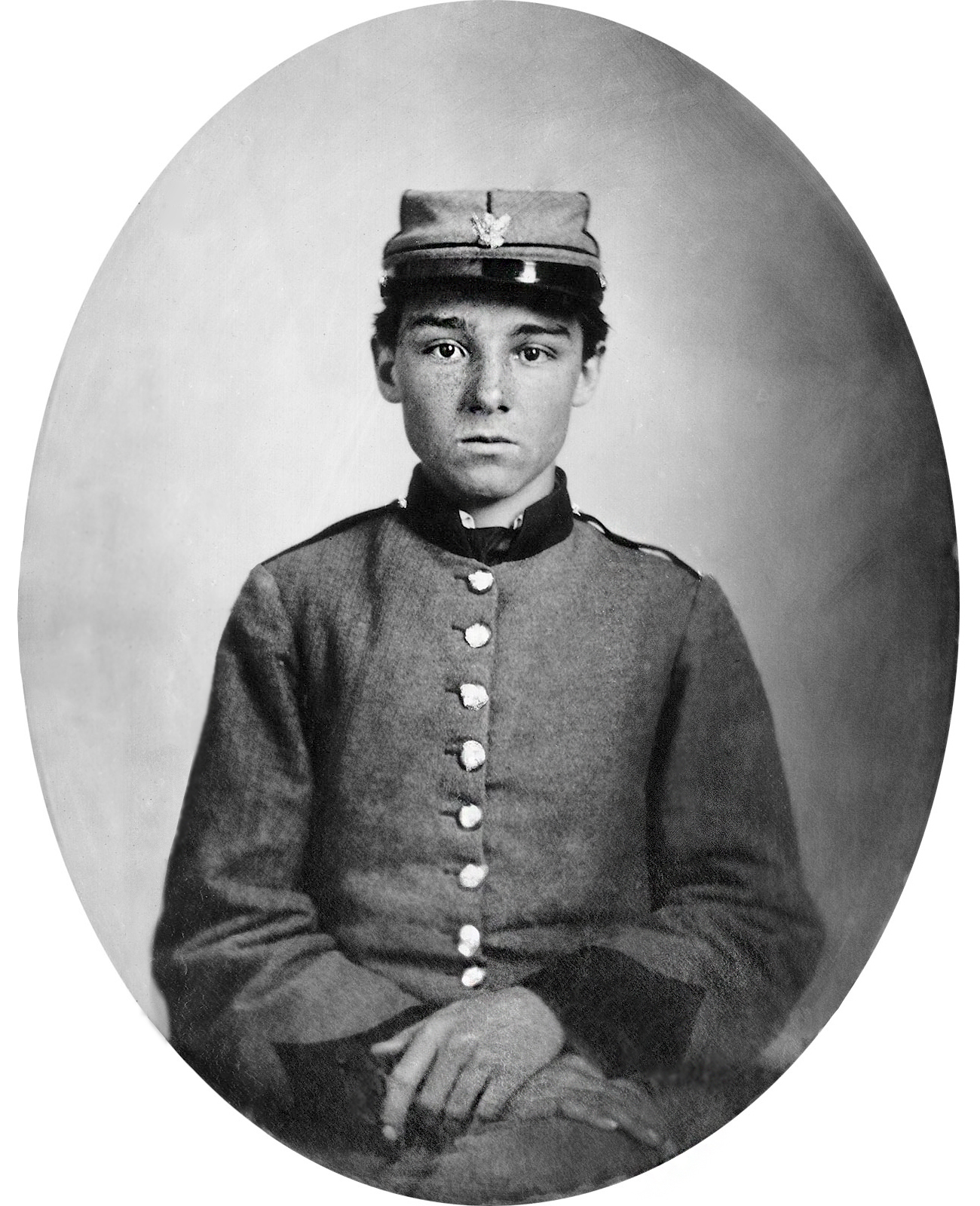
- Private Edwin F. Jemison, Company C, 2nd Louisiana Infantry Regiment, was killed at Malvern Hill.
- Active: 11 May 1861 – 9 April 1865
- Country: Confederate States of America
- Allegiance: Confederate States of America, Louisiana
- Branch: Confederate States Army
- Type: Infantry
- Size: Regiment (1,013 men, May 1861)
- Part of: 2nd Louisiana Brigade (Starke's, Nicholls', Stafford's
- Engagements: American Civil War; Action at Dam No. 1 (1862); Battle of Malvern Hill (1862); Battle of Cedar Mountain (1862); Second Battle of Bull Run (1862); Battle of Antietam (1862); Battle of Fredericksburg (1862); Battle of Chancellorsville (1863); Second Battle of Winchester (1863); Battle of Gettysburg (1863); Battle of Mine Run (1863); Battle of the Wilderness (1864); Battle of Spotsylvania (1864); Battle of Cold Harbor (1864); Battle of Monocacy (1864); Third Battle of Winchester (1864); Battle of Fisher's Hill (1864); Battle of Cedar Creek (1864); Siege of Petersburg (1864–65); Battle of Appomattox (1865)

Commanders
- Notable commanders: Louis Gustave De Russy; Jesse M. Williams

The 2nd Louisiana Infantry Regiment was a unit of volunteers recruited in Louisiana that fought in the Confederate States Army during the American Civil War. Formed in May 1861, the regiment was sent to fight in the Eastern Theater of the American Civil War. Its first action took place during the Siege of Yorktown. The regiment suffered very heavy losses at Malvern Hill. After joining an all-Louisiana brigade, it fought at Cedar Mountain, Second Bull Run, Antietam, and Fredericksburg in 1862, at Chancellorsville, Second Winchester, Gettysburg, and Mine Run in 1863, and at the Wilderness, Spotsylvania, Cold Harbor, Monocacy, Third Winchester, Fisher's Hill, Cedar Creek, and Petersburg in 1864, and at Appomattox in 1865. The regiment lost over 100 men at both Second Bull Run and Chancellorsville. A company-sized remnant surrendered at Appomattox.

== Formation ==
The 2nd Louisiana Infantry Regiment organized on 11 May 1861 at Camp Walker in New Orleans. There were 1,013 men enrolled in 10 companies named A–K, excluding J. The field officers were Colonel Louis Gustave De Russy, Lieutenant Colonel John Young, and Major Isiah T. Norwood. De Russy resigned on 19 July 1861 and was replaced as colonel by William M. Levy. On 30 April 1862, the regiment elected new officers. Levy was dropped and Norwood was promoted colonel on 1 May 1862. Young was dropped and Jesse M. Williams was promoted lieutenant colonel. Richard W. Ashton became major.

Norwood was mortally wounded on 1 July 1863 and replaced as colonel by Williams; Ross E. Burke was promoted lieutenant colonel and Michael A. Grogan was promoted major. Grogan replaced Ashton who was also killed on 1 July 1863. Williams was killed 12 May 1864 and replaced as colonel by Burke; Grogan was promoted lieutenant colonel and Martin C. Redwine was promoted major. Redwine was killed 17 September 1864. The company captains, nicknames, and recruitment parishes are listed in the table.

Company information for the 2nd Louisiana Infantry Regiment
Company	Nickname	Captains	Recruitment Parish
A	Lecompte Guards	William M. Levy (p); Ross E. Burke (p); John W. Brown (k); William H. Noel	Natchitoches
B	Moore Guards	John Kelso (x); Michael A. Grogan (p); James F. Utz	Rapides
C	Pelican Greys	Arthur H. Martin (x); Bernard B. Hemken (d); Robert Roberts (r); Dennis L. Griffin (k-2nd Winchester); N. L. Handy	Ouachita
D	Pelican Rifles	Jesse W. Williams (p); James S. Ashton (r); Thomas S. Crump (k-2nd Winchester); William N. Cunningham	DeSoto
E	Vernon Guards	Oscar M. Watkins (x); Michael C. Redwine (p); Eugene M. Kidd	Jackson
F	Claiborne Guards	John W. Andrews (x); A. S. Blythe	Claiborne
G	Floyd Guards	John W. Dunn (x); William C. Dixon (r); James M. Jones (u); John Elliott	Carroll
H	Atchafalaya Guards	Richard M. Boone (r); Thoms L. Harmanson (x); L. G. Picou (k-2nd Winchester); James M. Batchelor	Pointe Coupee
I	Greenwood Guards	William Flournoy (x); J. L. Fortson	Caddo
K	Vienna Rifles	H. W. Perrin (r); John J. Neilson (x); William A. Mayfield (r); J. W. McCullough (k-Cold Harbor); C. M. Farris	Jackson

- Key: d = died, k = killed, p = promoted, r = resigned, u = dropped 18 April 1864, x = dropped 30 April 1862.

== Service ==
=== 1861–1862 ===
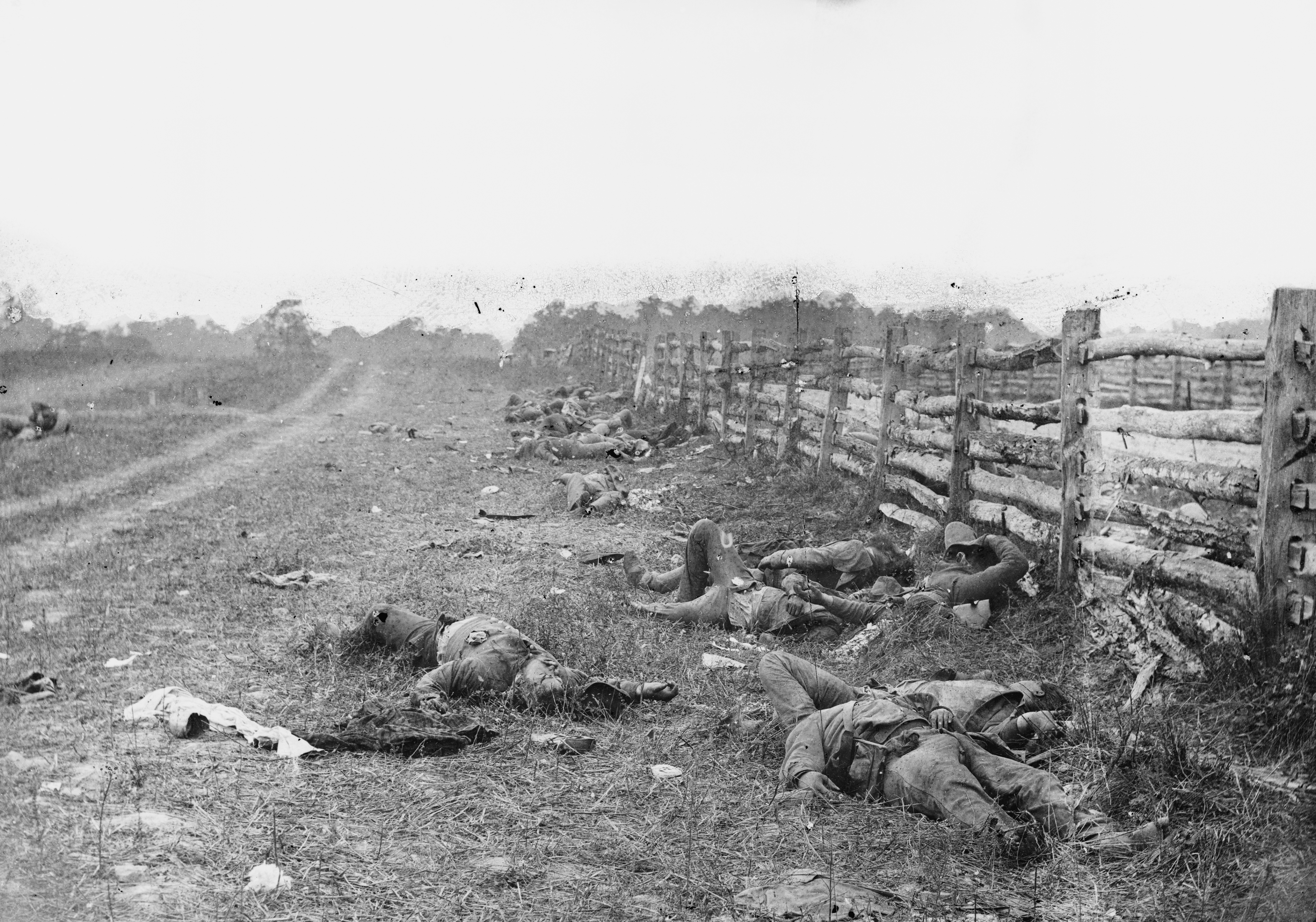
Dead soldiers from Starke's Louisiana brigade near Miller's corn field at Antietam

The 2nd Louisiana Infantry traveled from New Orleans to Richmond, Virginia. The soldiers helped build defensive earthworks near Yorktown and Williamsburg and spent the winter of 1861–1862 near Yorktown. On 16 April 1862, the regiment took part in the Action at Dam No. 1. After an artillery barrage, four companies of the 3rd Vermont Infantry waded across a pond and captured a line of Confederate rifle pits. After 40 minutes, they were counterattacked by a brigade of Georgians and Louisianians and driven off with 83 casualties out of the 192 Vermonters who carried out the probe. A later Federal attack was repulsed, bring total Union casualties to 165. At this time, the 2nd Louisiana Infantry was part of Brigadier General Howell Cobb's brigade and Brigadier General Lafayette McLaws' division. At the Battle of Malvern Hill on 1 July 1862, the troops led by Major General John B. Magruder carried out uncoordinated attacks instead of one concentrated assault. In Cobb's brigade, the 2nd Louisiana Infantry suffered 182 killed, wounded, and missing, the second highest losses of any Confederate regiment. Colonel Norwood and Major Ashton were both killed, along with three color bearers.

On 26 July 1862, the 2nd Louisiana Infantry was reassigned to a brigade including the 1st Louisiana Zouave Battalion, and the 1st Louisiana, 9th Louisiana, 10th Louisiana, and 15th Louisiana Infantry Regiments. The regiment was lightly engaged at the Battle of Cedar Mountain on 9 August. In the Second Battle of Bull Run on 28–30 August 1862, the brigade was led by Brigadier General William E. Starke and was part of a division commanded by Brigadier General William B. Taliaferro. However, Taliaferro was wounded on 28 August, so Starke took command of the division. Colonel Leroy Augustus Stafford of the 9th Louisiana assumed command of the brigade, which suffered losses of 110 killed, 269 wounded, and 6 missing during the battle. Nearly 130 men from the 2nd Louisiana Infantry became casualties during the fighting.

At the Battle of Antietam on 17 September 1862, Starke's brigade counted about 650 men and sustained losses of 70 killed and 204 wounded. The 2nd Louisiana Infantry lost 10 killed and 49 wounded. Around 7 am, Starke's and another brigade were ordered to charge toward Miller's corn field. Starke was killed after being struck by four bullets. The charge was brought to a halt by intense Union rifle and artillery fire. In the Battle of Fredericksburg on 13 December 1862, the regiment engaged in minor skirmishing. After Fredericksburg, the 1st Zouave Battalion was detached from the brigade and never rejoined.

=== 1863–1865 ===
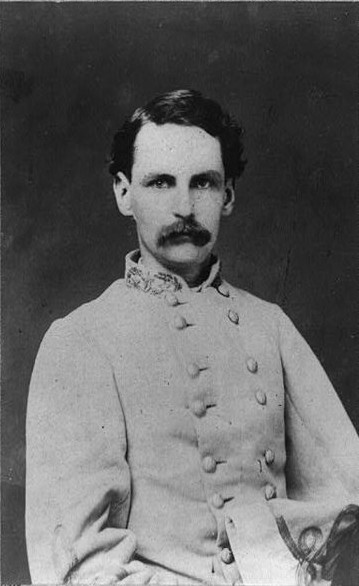
Francis T. Nicholls

At the Battle of Chancellorsville on 1–3 May 1863, Brigadier General Francis T. Nicholls commanded the brigade, which was part of Brigadier General Raleigh Colston's division. The brigade lost 46 killed, 268 wounded, and 130 missing during the struggle. The 2nd Louisiana Infantry suffered losses of 15 killed, 90 wounded, and 21 missing. The regiment took part in Lieutenant General Thomas J. Jackson's flank attack on 2 May and in the bitter fighting on 3 May. Nicholls, who was already missing his left arm, lost his left foot to an artillery projectile on 2 May. He was replaced in command of the brigade by Colonel Williams of the 2nd Louisiana Infantry. Sergeant William Clegg wrote that the regiment took about 175 men into battle and lost 126 in the fighting.

On 15 June at the Second Battle of Winchester, the 2nd and 10th Louisiana Infantry captured approximately 1,000 Union soldiers. The fighting claimed the lives of three captains: Griffin (C Company), Crump (D Company), and Picou (H Company). At the Battle of Gettysburg, the 2nd Louisiana Infantry attacked Culp's Hill on 2–3 July 1863. The regiment went into action with 236 men and sustained 62 casualties. Burke led the regiment and was wounded. The regiment was in a brigade commanded by Williams, in a division led by Major General Edward Johnson, and in the Second Corps under Lieutenant General Richard S. Ewell. At the Battle of Mine Run (Payne's Farm) on 27 November 1863, casualties in the regiment were light.

The 2nd Louisiana Infantry fought at the Battle of the Wilderness on 5 May 1864. The brigade was led by Brigadier General Stafford and was part of Johnson's division and Ewell's Second Corps. By 1864, Stafford's Louisiana brigade had won a reputation for drinking, pillaging, and hard fighting according to historian Gordon C. Rhea. From 1 to 3 pm on 5 May, Stafford's brigade helped repulse Union V Corps attacks at Saunders' Field. Later at 3:30 pm, the brigade found itself fighting in dense woods. As Stafford ordered his men to attack, the Stonewall Brigade on his right was driven back by Union VI Corps troops who then pushed into the space between the two brigades. Stafford's soldiers were compelled to withdraw in confusion and Stafford was mortally wounded by a bullet through his spine. The other Louisiana brigade under Brigadier General Harry T. Hays' rushed from the reserve to fill the gap, but lost one-third of its numbers in the fighting.

The Louisiana brigade fought in the Battle of Spotsylvania on 7–20 May 1864. An assault at first light on 12 May by the Union II Corps overran Johnson's division at the Bloody Angle, capturing 2,800 men and 20 artillery pieces. Johnson himself was captured and his division was nearly wiped out. The initial Union success was followed by brutal fighting that lasted all day, with neither side winning any advantage. Colonel Williams was killed and the 2nd Louisiana Infantry lost its flag. On 4 June, Captain McCullough (K Company) was killed at Cold Harbor. On 13 June, because Union soldiers were threatening Lynchburg, the Second Corps under Major General Jubal Early began moving to the Shenandoah Valley.

The regiment fought in the Valley campaigns of 1864 in the summer and fall, serving at the battles of Monocacy, Third Winchester, Fisher's Hill, and Cedar Creek. At Monocacy, the two Louisiana brigades were grouped under the command of Brigadier General Zebulon York in Major General John B. Gordon's division. At Cedar Creek, the 1st Louisiana was consolidated with the 14th Louisiana and the 10th and 15th Louisiana were consolidated. However, the 2nd Louisiana Infantry remained unconsolidated. By this time, the 9th Louisiana was assigned to Hays' Louisiana brigade.

In December 1864, the brigade returned from the Shenandoah Valley to serve in the Siege of Petersburg. On 9 April General Robert E. Lee surrendered after the Battle of Appomattox. At the formal surrender, 3 officers and 41 enlisted men from the 2nd Louisiana Infantry signed their paroles. During the war, the regiment sustained losses of 218 men killed in action, 181 died of disease, and 4 died by accident. Another 88 men deserted. Altogether, 1,297 men enrolled in the regiment during the war.

== See also ==
- List of Louisiana Confederate Civil War units
- Louisiana in the Civil War
