= General McCulloch =

General McCulloch may refer to:

- Andrew McCulloch (British Army officer) (1876–1960), British Army major general
- Benjamin McCulloch (1811–1862), Texas Militia major general and Confederate States Army brigadier general
- Henry Eustace McCulloch (1816–1895), Confederate States Army brigadier general

== See also ==
- Arthur L. McCullough (1896–1979), U.S. Air Force brigadier general
