= Gustavus De Russy =

American general (1818–1891)

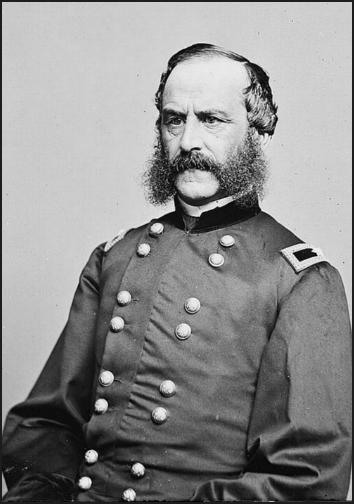

Quartermaster of Fort Monroe
- In office 1848–1857

Personal details
- Born: November 3, 1818 Brooklyn, New York, U.S.
- Died: May 29, 1891 (aged 72) Detroit, Michigan, U.S.
- Spouse: Frances Clitz (before 1891)
- Parent(s): René Edward De Russy; Harriet Elizabeth Taylor
- Education: West Point

Military service
- Allegiance: United States of America
- Branch/service: United States Army; Union Army
- Rank: Brigadier General
- Commands: III Corps
- Battles/wars: Mexican–American War; Battle of Contreras; Battle of Churubusco; Battle of Chapultepec; American Civil War; Peninsula Campaign; Seven Days Battles; Battle of Malvern Hill

Gustavus Adolphus De Russy (November 3, 1818 – May 29, 1891) was a US Army career officer, who was a part of the prominent De Russy military family. He was promoted to the rank of general during the American Civil War.

== Early life ==
De Russy was born in Brooklyn to American army officer René Edward De Russy (1789–1865) and Harriet Elizabeth Taylor (1805–1834). His father was born in Saint-Domingue (now Haiti) in 1789 and his French colonial family moved as refugees to Virginia two years later, fleeing the revolution on the island. Gustavus's sister, Clara Louise De Russey (1829–1900), married William Augustus Nichols (1818–1869), who became a Brevet Maj. Gen. His sister, Emily Caroline De Russy (1831–1857), married Henry Jackson Hunt (1819–1889), who became a Brig. Gen.

After his mother's death in 1834, his father remarried to Helen Augusta Maxwell (1832–1908). Through this marriage, De Russy was the half-brother of Fanny De Russy (1857–1925), who married Eli D. Hoyle (1851–1921); and Sara Wetmore De Russy (1860–1926), who married Arthur Murray (1851–1925). Both brothers-in-law were also career officers, as were their sons.

Like his father and paternal uncle, De Russy was admitted to West Point, starting in 1835. He was forced to resign in 1838 for alcohol use.

== Career ==
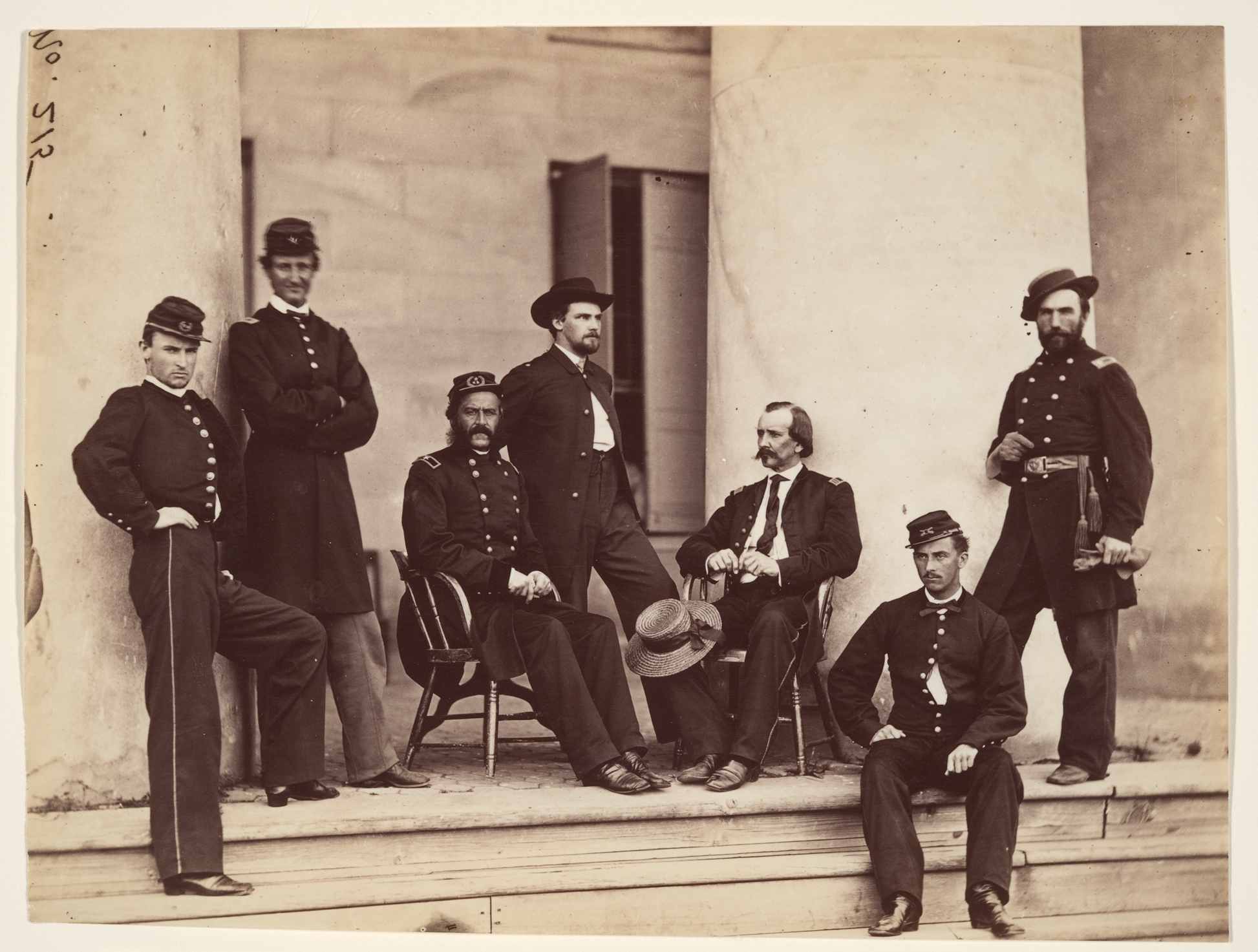
DeRussy and Staff on Steps of Arlington House in Arlington, Virginia, May 1864

In 1847, De Russy was commissioned as a second lieutenant in the US Army and served in the Mexican–American War, first winning a brevet to 1st Lieutenant for "gallantry and meritorious service" at the Battle of Contreras and the Churubusco, and later, a brevet to captain for "gallant and meritorious service" at Chapultepec. By virtue of his service in the Mexican War, he became a member of the Aztec Club of 1847 in 1881.

He remained in the army following the war, serving as quartermaster at Fort Monroe from 1848 until 1857. That year he was promoted to captain.

By the start of the Civil War, De Russy was serving in the 4th US Artillery. He commanded the artillery reserve of III Corps in the Peninsula Campaign and the Seven Days Battles, receiving promotions to major and lieutenant colonel. He was promoted to colonel in March 1863 and again to brigadier general of volunteers in May of the same year. He commanded the southern defenses of Washington, D.C. until the end of the war.

After the war, De Russy reverted to the rank of major as the forces were reduced. He continued serving in the army, receiving new promotions to lieutenant colonel in 1879, and colonel in 1882, until retiring in 1882.

== Personal life ==
De Russy was married to Frances Clitz (1836–1901). She was the daughter of Captain John Clitz (1790–1836), who died while in command of Fort Mackinac, sister of Rear Admiral John M. B. Clitz (1821–1897), Commander of the Asiatic Squadron; and Brig. Gen. Henry Boynton Clitz (1824–1888), the Commandant of Cadets at the West Point from 1862 to 1864. His wife's sister Sarah Clitz (1835–1906) married 1857 West Point graduate Robert H. Anderson (1835–1888), who resigned his U.S. Army commission to become a brigadier general in the Confederate States Army.

Together, she and De Russy had the following children:

- René Edward De Russy (1858–1860), who died young.
- Emily Clitz De Russy (1862–1949), who married John Trust Sickel (1862–1921) on July 21, 1898, in Alma, Michigan.

De Russy died in his home in Detroit on April 30, 1891. He was buried in Elmwood Cemetery in his hometown.
