= Attorney General Murray =

Attorney General Murray may refer to:

- James Murray (Ohio politician) (1830–1881), Attorney General of Ohio
- John L. Murray (judge) (born 1943), Attorney General of Ireland

== See also ==
- General Murray (disambiguation)
