= Edwin Francis Jemison =

Confederate soldier (1844–1862)

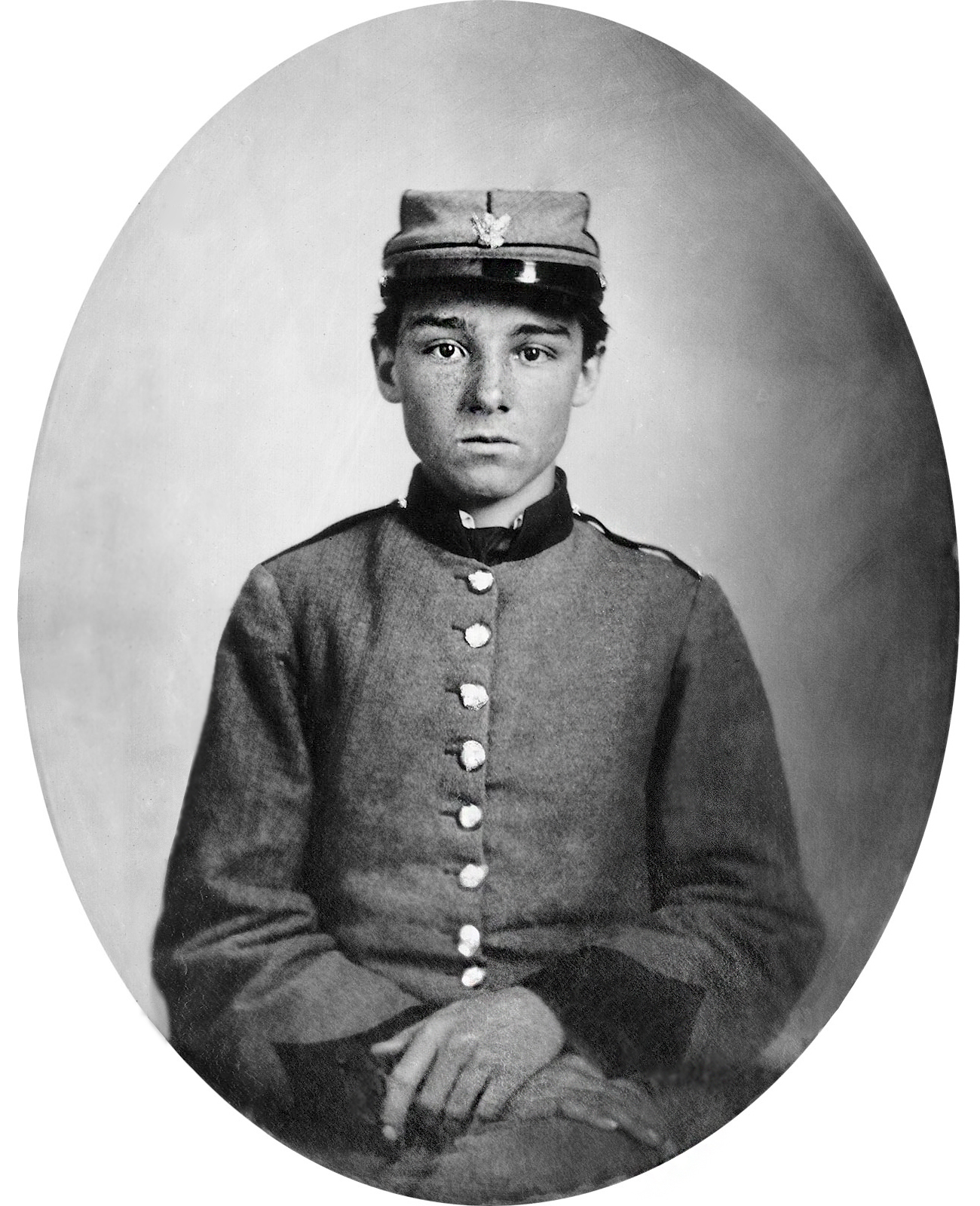
- Jemison in uniform, c. 1861
- Born: December 1, 1844; Milledgeville, Georgia, U.S.
- Died: July 1, 1862 (aged 17); Henrico County, Virginia, U.S.
- Cause of death: Killed in action
- Military career
- Allegiance: Confederate States
- Branch: Confederate States Army
- Service years: 1861–1862
- Rank: Private
- Units: Company C, 2nd Louisiana Infantry Regiment
- Battles: American Civil War; Peninsula Campaign; Battle of Malvern Hill †

Edwin Francis Jemison (December 1, 1844 – July 1, 1862) was a Confederate soldier who served in the 2nd Louisiana Infantry Regiment from May 1861 until he was killed in action at the Battle of Malvern Hill.

Jemison's photograph has become one of the iconic portraits of the young soldiers of both the Confederate and Union armies. It was featured particularly on the cover of the American Russian-language magazine Amerika in 1991.

== Early life ==
Edwin Francis Jemison was born on December 1, 1844, in Milledgeville, Georgia as the second-oldest of five sons of Robert Jemison and Sarah Caroline Jemison (née Stubb), who had married in 1841. Robert Jemison was a landowner, lawyer and newspaper editor. The family later moved to Jackson, Louisiana where they lived at the outbreak of the American Civil War. On January 26, 1861, Louisiana seceded from the United States to join the Confederate States.

== American Civil War ==
Jemison enlisted on May 11, 1861, in Company B (Moore's Guards) of the 2nd Louisiana Infantry Regiment, and was among the war's early volunteers. He participated in the Peninsula Campaign under Maj. Gen. Magruder. Jemison was signed on at Camp Walker in New Orleans by Captain J.M. Galt. By May 1862 Jemison moved to Company C (the Pelican Grays).

=== Battle of Malvern Hill ===
Jemison was killed on July 1, 1862, at the Battle of Malvern Hill. The circumstances of his death will likely never be fully known, though a popular story emerged of a direct hit from a cannonball which decapitated him. The cause of his death has since been called into question. The death by cannon fire story was corroborated by the 1887 obituary of his younger brother, Sam, but incorrectly identifies the battle as First Manassas. Biographer Alexandra Filipowski debunks the tale altogether. A veteran named Captain Moseley told the gruesome story of the decapitation to crowds all over the south, often for money. At one such event, Jemison's brother was in attendance and drew his own conclusion, stating "that was my brother." It has since been shown, however, that Moseley did not fight at Malvern Hill and could not have witnessed Private Jemison's demise. Filipowski cites Jemison's obituary as the only actual known account of his death: "He sustain[ed] himself in the front rank of the soldier and gentlemen until the moment of his death. Bounding forward at the order ‘Charge!’ he was stricken down in the front rank, and without a struggle yielded up his young life."

Following the Battle of Malvern Hill, both sides buried their dead on the battlefield. After the American Civil War, organizations like the United Daughters of the Confederacy returned to the old battlefields and disinterred the bodies of fallen Confederate soldiers and gave them proper burials in places like the Confederate Section of Hollywood Cemetery in nearby Richmond, Virginia. It is thought that Jemison's parents erected the monument to him at Memory Hill Cemetery in Milledgeville, Georgia, where he may be buried. Most believe that he was buried on or near the Malvern Hill battlefield in Henrico County, Virginia, in an unmarked grave.

== See also ==
- Johnny Reb
- List of iconic photographs
