= Fort DeRussy (Washington, D.C.) =

Historical fort in Washington, D.C.

- Part of the Civil War defenses of Washington, D.C.
- Rock Creek Park, Washington, D.C.
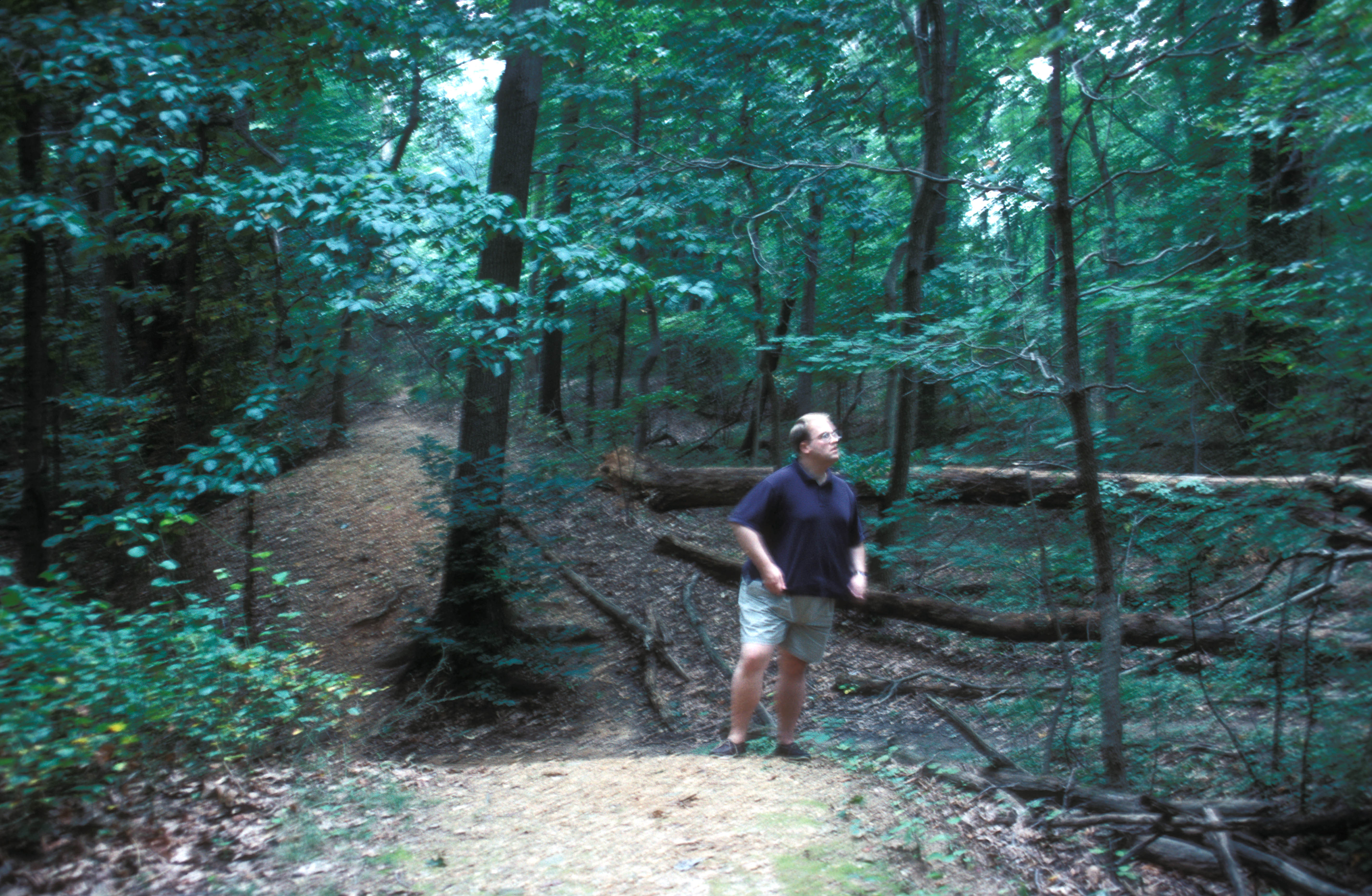
- Site of the fort with vegetative overgrowth

Site information
- Type: Earthwork fort
- Owner: National Park Service
- Controlled by: Union Army (1861–1865)

Location
- Coordinates: 38°57′47″N 77°03′04″W
- Area: c. 65 ares (0.65 ha)

Site history
- Built: 1861
- Built by: 4th New York Heavy Artillery Regiment
- In use: 1861–1865
- Materials: Earth, timber
- Fate: Fort demolished; land part of Rock Creek Park
- Battles/wars: American Civil War

Garrison information
- Designations: NRHP contributing property

Fort DeRussy was an American Civil War-era fortification constructed in 1861 on a hilltop along the west bank of Rock Creek within Washington, D.C., as part of the Defenses of Washington.

== History ==
The fort was named for Gustavus A. DeRussy, or his father, René Edward DeRussy. It was a trapezoidal earthwork with a perimeter of 190 yards, and places for 13 guns. There were also supporting rifle pits, and abatis in the Rock Creek streambed.

The fort provided support during the nearby Battle of Fort Stevens (July 11–12, 1864), contributing a large amount of cannon fire in the course of that battle; the fort's 100-pounder Parrott rifle was particularly effective then, getting off 32 rounds. Today, the grounds of the fort are administered by the U.S. National Park Service as part of Rock Creek Park in the northern portion of the District of Columbia.

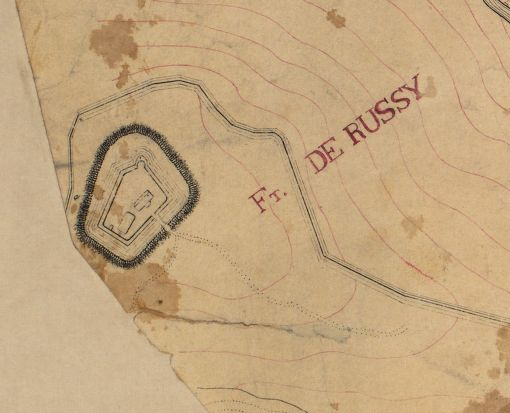
Extract from Topographical map, 1st Brigade, defenses north of Potomac, Washington, D.C., 1863, by Robert Adolfo Chodasiewicz [R. A. Hodasevich].

The fort's parapet and dry moat are in a good state of preservation, remnants of powder magazines are still visible, and lines of infantry trenches that protected the fort are still present near the fort.

The site, heavily wooded, is easily reached by a trail from the west bank of the creek north of Military Road, so-called because it connected the ring of defensive installations around the capital.
