= Maxwell Murray =

United States Army general

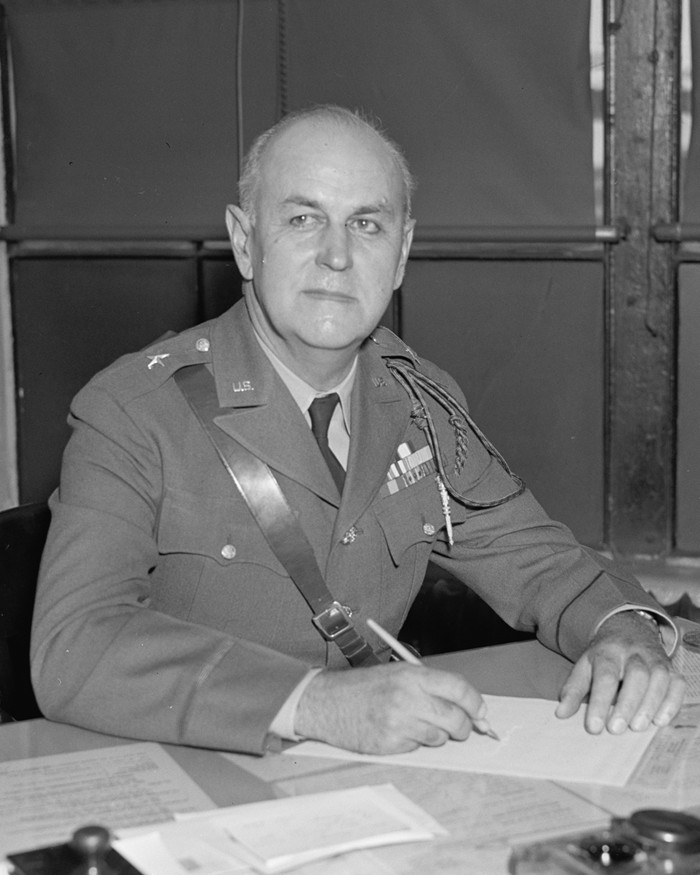
- Maxwell Murray as a Brigadier General
- Born: June 19, 1885; West Point, New York, US
- Died: August 4, 1948 (aged 63); Siasconset, Massachusetts, US
- Burial place: Arlington National Cemetery
- Military career
- Allegiance: United States of America
- Branch: United States Army
- Service years: 1907–1946
- Rank: Major General
- Commands: 25th Infantry Division
- Conflicts: Pancho Villa Expedition; World War I: Battle of Cantigny; Battle of Soissons (1918); Second Battle of the Marne; World War II: Attack on Pearl Harbor; Pacific War
- Awards: Army Distinguished Service Medal; Silver Star; Legion of Merit (3)

Maxwell Murray (June 19, 1885 – August 4, 1948) was a United States Army officer, who rose to the rank of major general. Murray commanded the 25th Infantry Division during the Attack on Pearl Harbor. He was the son of Major General Arthur Murray.

== Early years and World War I ==
Maxwell Murray was born on June 19, 1885, at West Point, New York, a son of Major General Arthur Murray (the first Chief of the Coast Artillery Corps) and his wife Sarah Wetmore DeRussy, daughter of Union Brigadier General René Edward De Russy.

Murray attended the United States Military Academy from 1903 to 1907, and was commissioned a second lieutenant of Cavalry on June 14, 1907. During World War I, Murray was transferred to the Field Artillery branch on January 13, 1917, and was sent with the 5th Field Artillery, 1st Division, to France.

Murray was promoted to the temporary rank of colonel and was put in command of the 5th Field Artillery during the Battle of Cantigny, Battle of Soissons and Second Battle of the Marne. For his leadership, he was awarded the Distinguished Service Medal and Silver Star. He was also decorated with the Croix de guerre with Guilt Star and Fourragère by the government of France.

== Interwar service ==
After the war, upon his return from the European battlefield, Murray reverted to the rank of major in the Field Artillery and was put in command of the Artillery training center at Fort Bragg, North Carolina. Between 1919 and 1920, Murray took a special course at the Massachusetts Institute of Technology and after graduation, he was transferred to the Office of Chief of Field Artillery, under the command of Major General William J. Snow.

In 1924, Murray attended the Field Artillery School at Fort Sill, Oklahoma, where he gained more knowledge about Field Artillery. Subsequently, he attended the Command and General Staff College at Fort Leavenworth, Kansas.

His next assignment was as aide-de-camp to Governor-General of the Philippines, Dwight F. Davis from 1929 to 1932.

Subsequently, Murray returned to Fort Bragg, North Carolina, where he was appointed a member of Field Artillery Board. In this capacity, Murray was promoted to the rank of colonel. In 1936, he was transferred to the 5th Field Artillery Regiment, where he was appointed executive officer of the unit and commanding officer the following year.

== World War II ==
With the Japanese attack on Pearl Harbor in December 1941, Murray served as a commanding general of the 25th Infantry Division (former Hawaiian Division). During his command, 25th Division performed intensive training due to its deployment in the Pacific. He served in this capacity until the end of April 1942, when he was replaced by major general J. Lawton Collins. In addition, Murray was awarded with his first Legion of Merit for his service as CG of 25th Infantry Division.

Major General Murray subsequently served as a commanding general of the 35th Infantry Division stationed at Camp San Luis Obispo, California. He was succeeded by Major General Paul W. Baade in January 1943 and transferred to Pasadena, Southern California, where he commanded the local sector within Western Defense Command under the command of general John L. DeWitt. Murray also received an Oak Leaf Cluster to the Legion of Merit for his service in Western Defense Command.

In 1943, Major General Murray was transferred to the combat area in New Caledonia in Central Pacific area, where he commanded the Guadalcanal Island Forward Area. This command included the Fiji Islands. For his service in this capacity, Murray was awarded with the Second Oak Leaf Cluster to the Legion of Merit.

In November 1945, Murray returned to the United States and was assigned to the headquarters of the Army Ground Forces in Washington, D.C. Murray finally retired from the Army on September 30, 1946.

== Retirement ==
Major General Maxwell Murray died of a heart attack on August 4, 1948, at the age of 63 years at his home in Siasconset, Massachusetts. He and his wife Phyllis Muriel Howard (1890–1976) had a son, Colonel Arthur Maxwell Murray (USMA Class of 1938) (1913–2000) and a daughter, Ann Murray Hess (1915–2001). He is buried together with his family at Arlington National Cemetery in Virginia.

== Decorations ==
Here is the ribbon bar of Major General Maxwell Murray:

1st Row	Army Distinguished Service Medal				Fourragère
2nd Row	Silver Star	Legion of Merit with two Oak Leaf Clusters	U.S. Treasury Life Saving Silver Medal	Mexican Border Service Medal	Fourragère
3rd Row	World War I Victory Medal with three Battle Clasps	American Defense Service Medal with Foreign Service Clasp	American Campaign Medal	Asiatic-Pacific Campaign Medal with two Service Stars	Fourragère
4th Row	World War II Victory Medal	Honorary Commander of the Order of the British Empire	French Croix de guerre 1914–1918 with Guilt Star	Officer of the Royal Order of Cambodia	Fourragère
