= Fort DeRussy (Louisiana) =

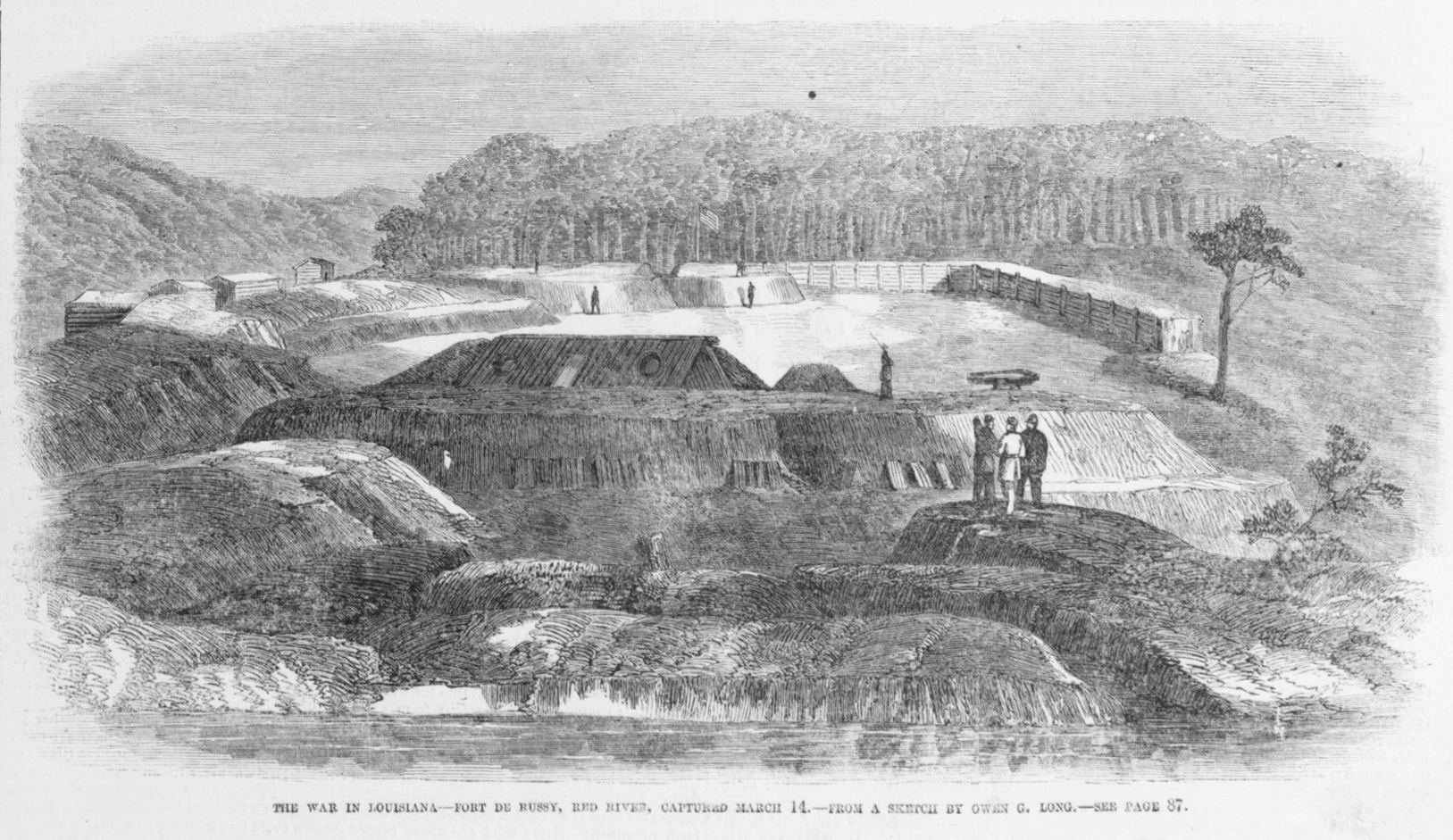
- Fort DeRussy, from a sketch by Owen G. Long

- Location within Louisiana

General information
- Location: Marksville, Louisiana, United States
- Coordinates: 31°10′35″N 92°03′39″W
- Construction started: 1862
- Completed: 1862

Technical details
- Structural system: Earthen
- Fort DeRussy
- U.S. National Register of Historic Places
- Location: 379 Fort DeRussy Road
- Nearest city: Marksville
- Area: 74 acres (30 ha)
- Built: 1862
- NRHP reference No.: 16000669
- Added to NRHP: September 23, 2016

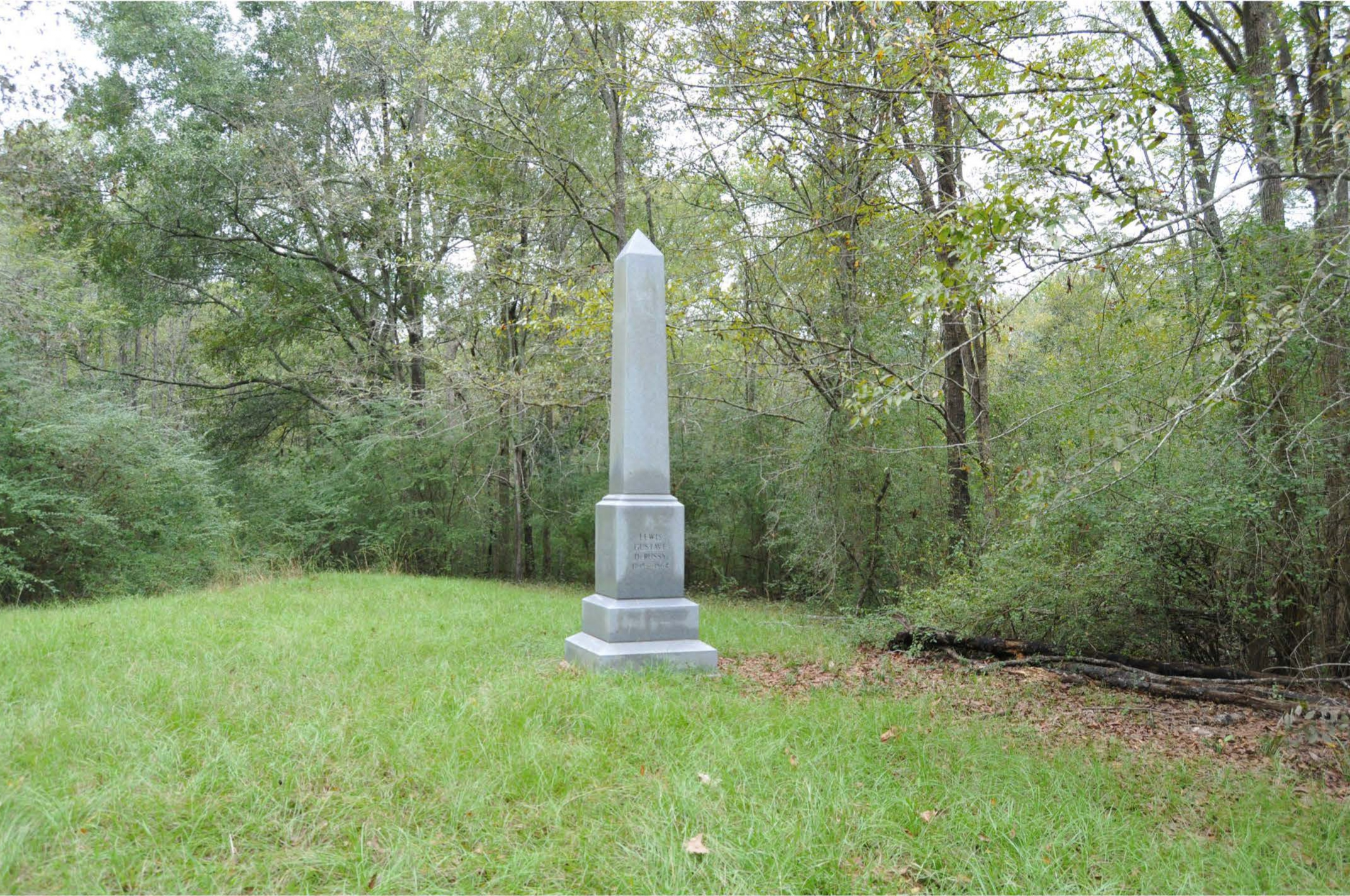
Fort DeRussy in Louisiana.

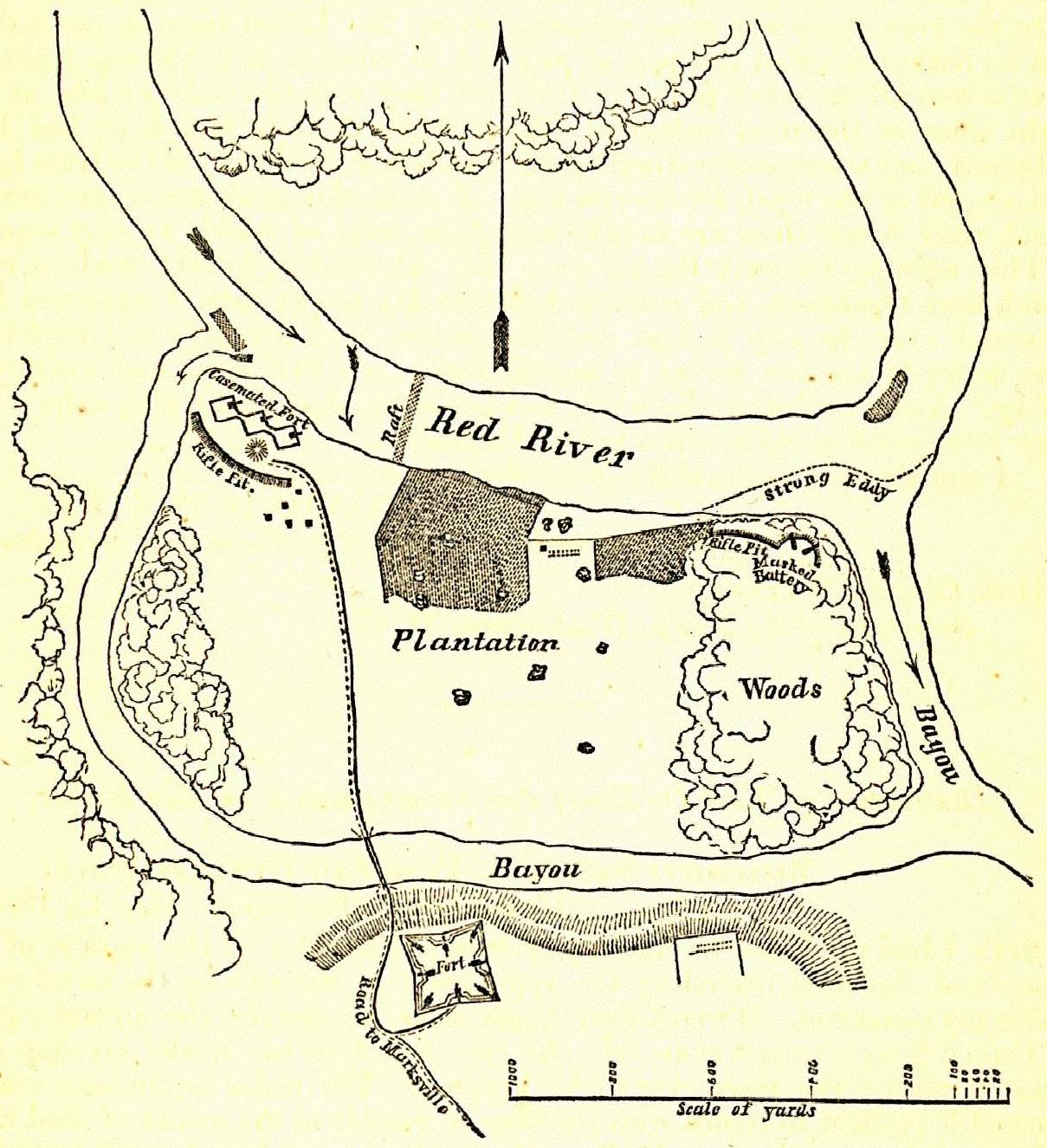
Plan showing the defenses of Fort DeRussy

Fort DeRussy, located south of Alexandria, Louisiana, and four miles (6 km) north of Marksville, was a Confederate earthwork stronghold during the American Civil War. It was built in 1862 to defend the lower Red River Valley in Louisiana. Located in Avoyelles Parish, the fort, cemetery and water batteries were designated as a state historic site in 1994. The fort and the water battery were listed on the National Register of Historic Places in 2016.

The fort was named for Colonel Lewis G. DeRussy, the oldest West Point graduate to serve in the Confederate Army. Born in New York City in 1795 to a French family who were refugees from revolutions in Saint-Domingue and France, DeRussy was educated at West Point Academy. He was a career officer in the US Army and engineer, first stationed in Louisiana in 1826, where he lived for nearly 40 years.

DeRussy had become a prominent engineer in civilian life after his earlier military service with the US Army, including during the Mexican War. He also had a cotton plantation, and in the 1850s he served in the state house and state senate.

== DeRussy service ==
He returned to military service during the American Civil War, joining the Confederacy. He was the engineering officer in charge of the construction of the first fortifications at the fort.

He died at his plantation home of a heart attack in December 1864. In the late 20th century, the remains of the colonel were exhumed from an abandoned grave and reinterred on the grounds of the fort on September 26, 1999.

== Battles at the fort ==
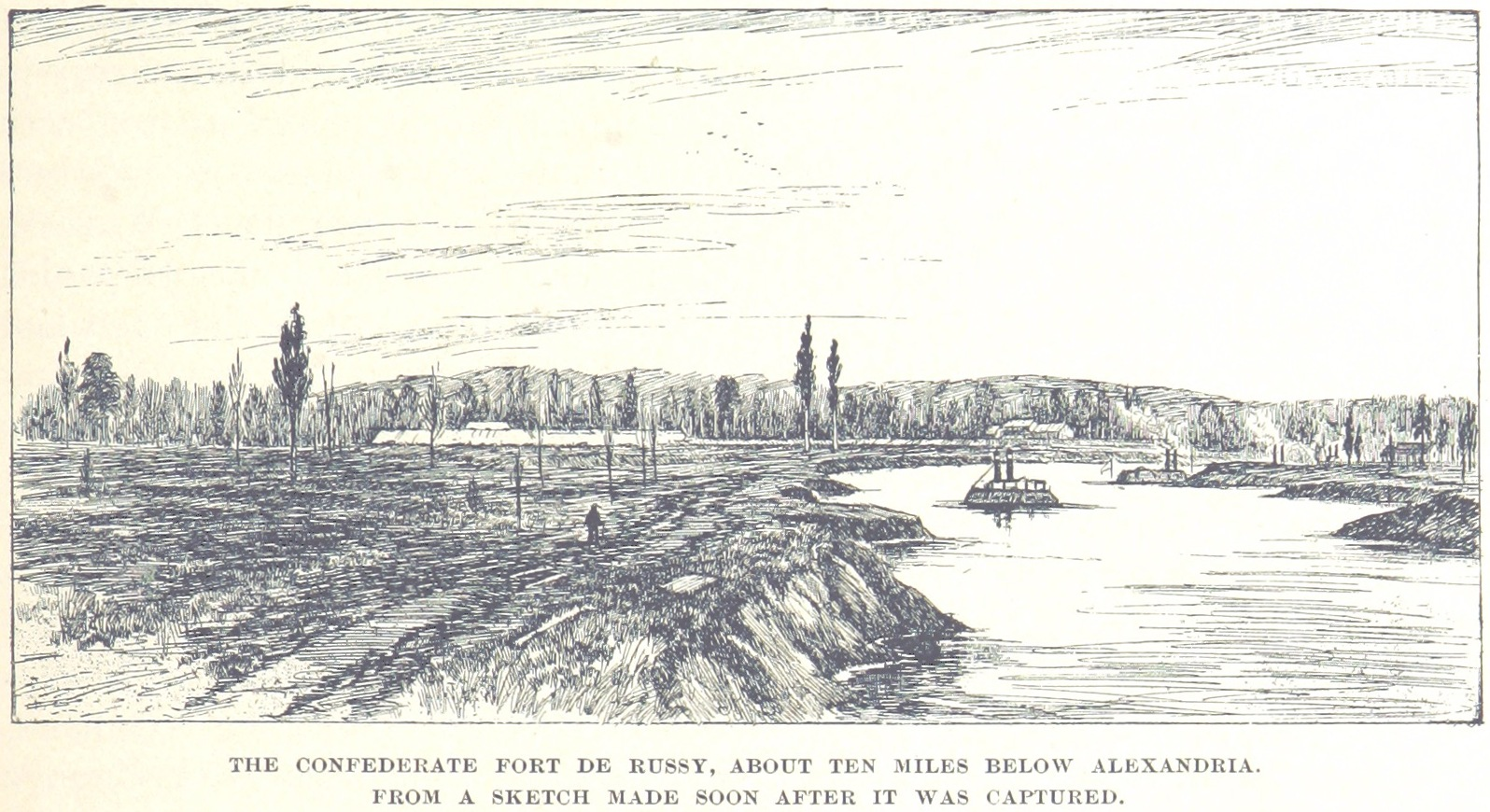
A drawing of Fort DeRussy sometime after its capture

A portion of Rear Admiral David D. Porter's Mississippi Squadron captured the fort on May 5, 1863. areas were destroyed on May 9, 1863, by the USS Benton. The remnants of the garrison at the fort surrendered to the Union Army, led by General A. J. Smith, on March 14, 1864.

== Maps and plans ==
Drawn under the direction of Captain R. M. Venable, Chief of Topographical Bureau of Western Louisiana and Arkansas:

- Map of Fort DeRussy and vicinity
- Plans of Fort DeRussy and obstructions of the Red River below Fort DeRussy 1864

== Preservation ==
The property was donated to the City of Marksville so that it could receive a $75,000 grant from the State of Louisiana to improve the site in order for it to be accepted by the State Parks system. The Friends of Fort DeRussy were commissioned to manage the improvements for the city. A grant of $150,000 was received from the Red River Waterway Commission to purchase an additional 53 acres (210,000 m^{2}), and 11 more acres were donated by the City of Marksville, at which time the state agreed to accept the donation of the fort and adjoining 70 acres (280,000 m^{2}). The American Battlefield Trust and its partners have acquired and preserved 80 acres of the battlefield in three transactions since 1999.

== See also ==
- Battle of Fort DeRussy
