= James Lore Murray =

James L. Murray
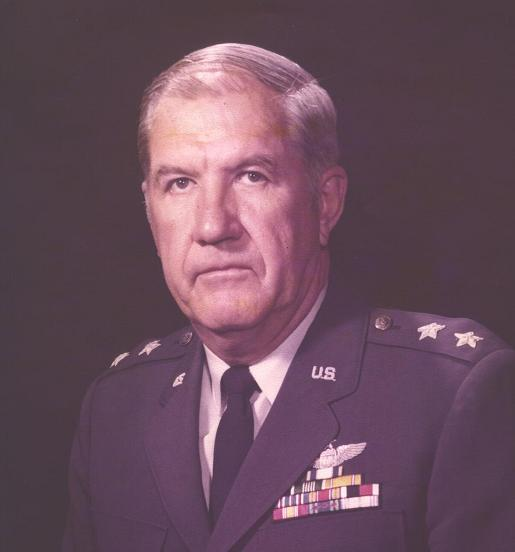
- Major General James L. Murray
- Born: January 4, 1919; Newton, North Carolina
- Died: May 9, 2004 (aged 85); Point Clear, Alabama
- Burial place: Arlington National Cemetery
- Military career
- Allegiance: United States of America
- Branch: United States Air Force
- Service years: 1940–1975
- Rank: Major General
- Awards: Air Force Distinguished Service Medal

Major General James L. Murray (January 4, 1919 – May 9, 2004) was a United States Air Force officer and Engineering Project Manager for the XB-52 at Wright-Patterson Air Force Base.

== Biography ==
In 1939, Murray graduated from the North Carolina State College with a degree in aeronautical engineering. He took a position at NACA working with wind tunnels at Langley Field.

In 1940, he joined the U.S. Army Air Corps as a flying cadet, and subsequently received a commission as a 2nd Lieutenant in February 1941. During the war, he was a flight instructor for the B-17, B-24, and B-29 at Gunter Field. Notable among his students were members of the Tuskegee Airmen 332nd Fighter Group (99th Pursuit Group) and the aviation author Ernest K. Gann, who referred to him as "a most skillful young Army pilot."

After the war, he worked as a NACA pilot at Moffett Field testing thermal deicing systems.

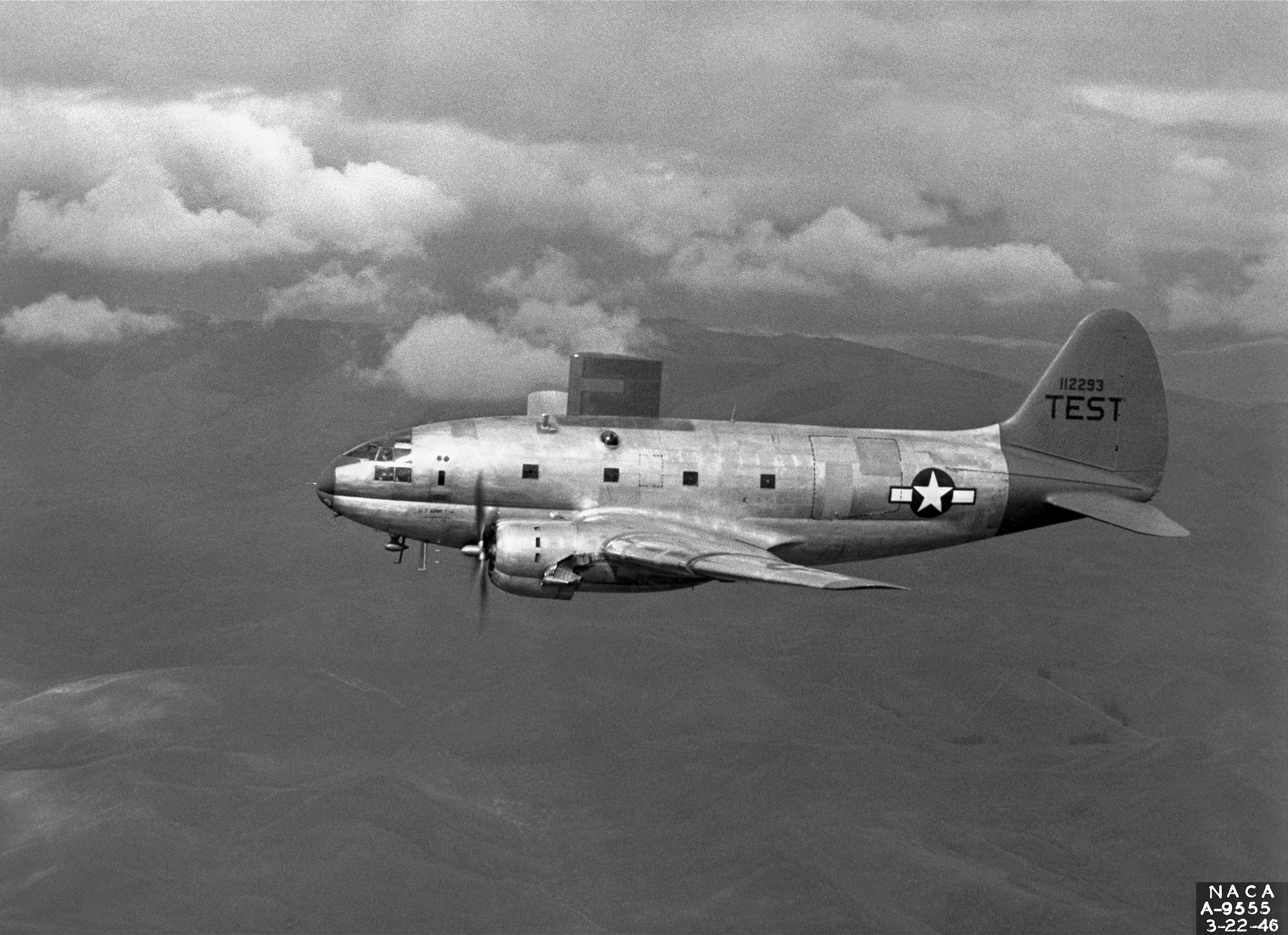
NACA C-46A testing de-icing systems.

His career in the Air Force included being the Chief of Special Projects at Wright Field where the ejection seat used in jet aircraft was introduced, and a project manager during the nascent XB-52 program.

In 1954, Murray resigned his active commission as Colonel, but remained in the reserve until 1975 when he retired as a Major General. He was awarded the Air Force Distinguished Service Medal at Bolling AFB.

From 1971-1975, he was chairman of the Air Force Reserve Forces Policy Committee under the Secretary of the Air Force.

For 30 years, he held several executive positions in the aerospace industry at Garrett Corporation, Republic Aviation, Aero Commander, Vice President of the C-5 division at Douglas Aircraft Company. In 1969 he became President of Teledyne/CAE and served in local roles including the Toledo-Lucas County Port Authority and as chairman of the Toledo Area Chamber of Commerce.

Murray was a member of Conquistadores del Cielo, The Burning Tree Club and a trustee of the USAF Falcon Foundation.

== Death ==
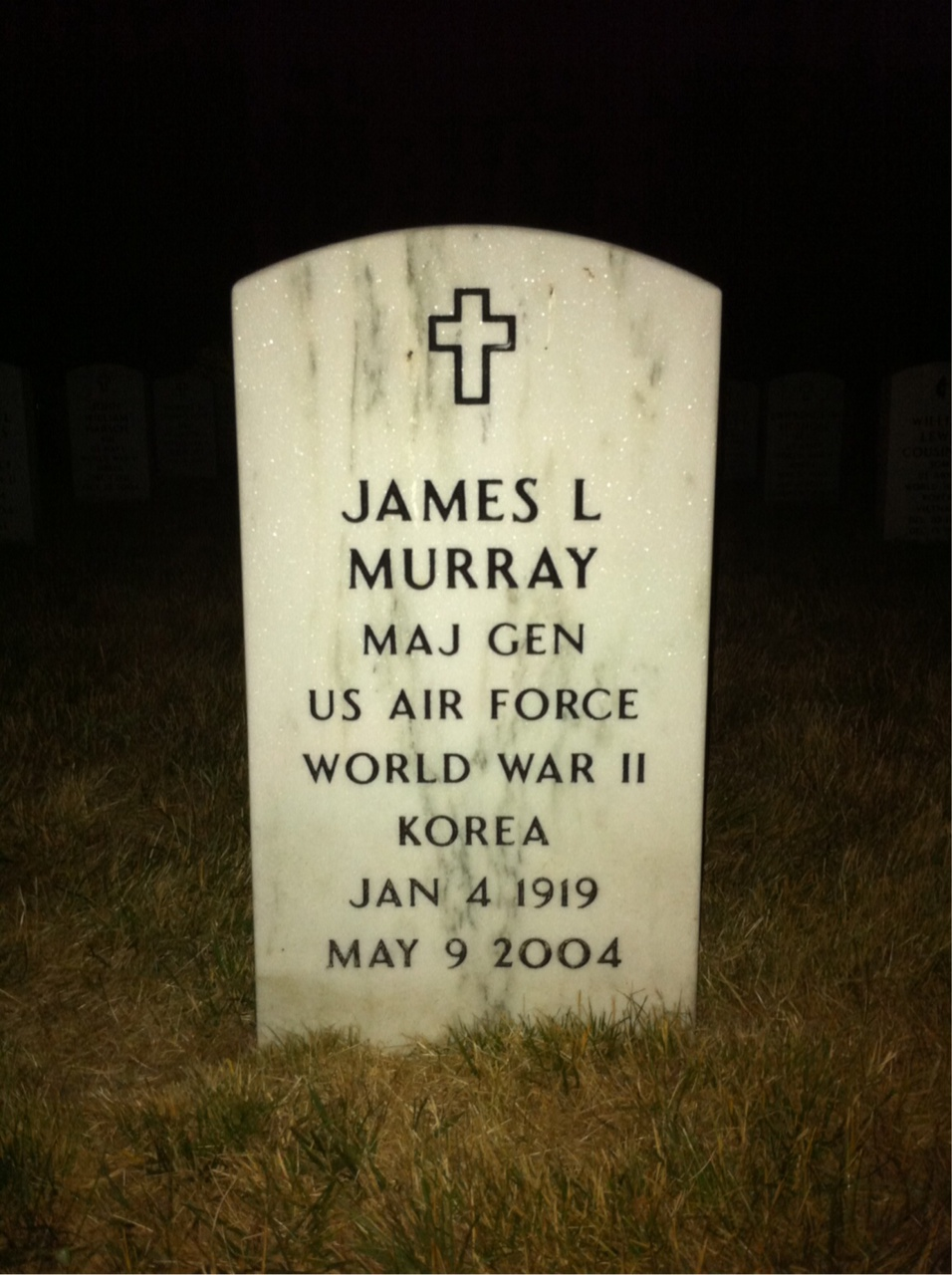
Grave at Arlington National Cemetery

Following prolonged illness which included lung cancer, Murray died on May 9, 2004, at the age of 85 of congestive heart failure at his home in Point Clear, Alabama. He was survived by his wife Phyllis Jennings Murray; daughters Lucy Howell, Marilyn Van Dyke, Margaret Harcourt, and sons James L. Murray, Jr., Mark Murray, Kenneth Murray, Bret Murray, and nine grandchildren and one great-grandchild. Murray was interred in Arlington National Cemetery.
