= Rene Edward De Russy Hoyle =

United States Army general

René Edward De Russy Hoyle
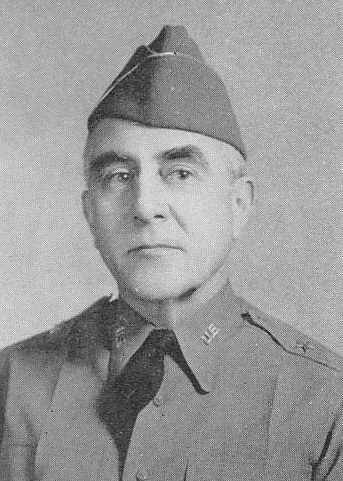
- From the 1941 yearbook of the 9th Infantry Division
- Born: September 16, 1883; New York City, New York, U.S.
- Died: November 1, 1981 (aged 98); West Haven, Connecticut
- Burial place: Arlington National Cemetery
- Spouse: Christine Guilfoyle
- Relatives: Eli DuBose Hoyle (father); René E. De Russy (grandfather)
- Military career
- Allegiance: United States of America
- Branch: United States Army
- Rank: Major general

René Edward De Russy Hoyle (September 16, 1883 – November 1, 1981) was a major general in the United States Army.

== Early life ==
Hoyle was born in New York on September 16, 1883. He was the son of Brigadier General Eli DuBose Hoyle (1851–1921) and Fanny De Russy (1857–1925). His maternal grandfather was Brigadier General René Edward De Russy.

He attended the U.S. Military Academy at West Point, N.Y., graduating in 1906.

== Career ==
After graduating from the United States Military Academy, he was assigned to the artillery. Later he would become Professor of Military Science and Tactics at Yale University.

In February 1942, he was promoted to brigadier general, nominated by President Roosevelt and confirmed by the United States Senate, along with sixteen others. During World War II, he would command the 9th Infantry Division. His retirement was effective as of August 31, 1945.

He was awarded the Army Distinguished Service Medal on July 9, 1918, by the President of the United States. The medal's citation reads:

The President of the United States of America, authorized by Act of Congress, July 9, 1918, takes pleasure in presenting the Army Distinguished Service Medal to Colonel (Field Artillery) Rene Edward DeRussy Hoyle, United States Army, for exceptionally meritorious and distinguished services to the Government of the United States, in a duty of great responsibility during World War I. As Executive Officer and later as Assistant Commandant of the School of Fire for Field Artillery, Fort Sill, Oklahoma, during the period from November 1917 to May 1919, Colonel Hoyle displayed remarkable tact and excellent judgment, combined with executive and professional ability of a high order in positions of great responsibility, thereby contributing materially toward bringing that school to a state of maximum efficiency in a time of great emergency.

He was also presented with the Legion of Merit "for exceptionally meritorious conduct in the performance of outstanding services to the Government of the United States as Commander, Camp Roberts, from 1942 to 1945."

== Personal life ==
Hoyle was married to Christine Guilfoyle (1888–1967). Together, they were the parents of:

- René Edward De Russy Hoyle Jr. (1912–1935), who died in an accident at the age of 22.
- Susie-Lane Hoyle (1912–2000), who married Devere Parker Armstrong (1906–1980).
- John Guilfoyle Hoyle (1916–1986)

Hoyle died on November 1, 1981, in West Haven, Connecticut. He is buried with Christine and Rene Jr., as well as his parents, at Arlington National Cemetery.

Military offices
Preceded by Jacob L. Devers	Commanding General 9th Infantry Division; 1941–1942	Succeeded by Manton S. Eddy
