= Louis Gustave De Russy =

United States Army officer

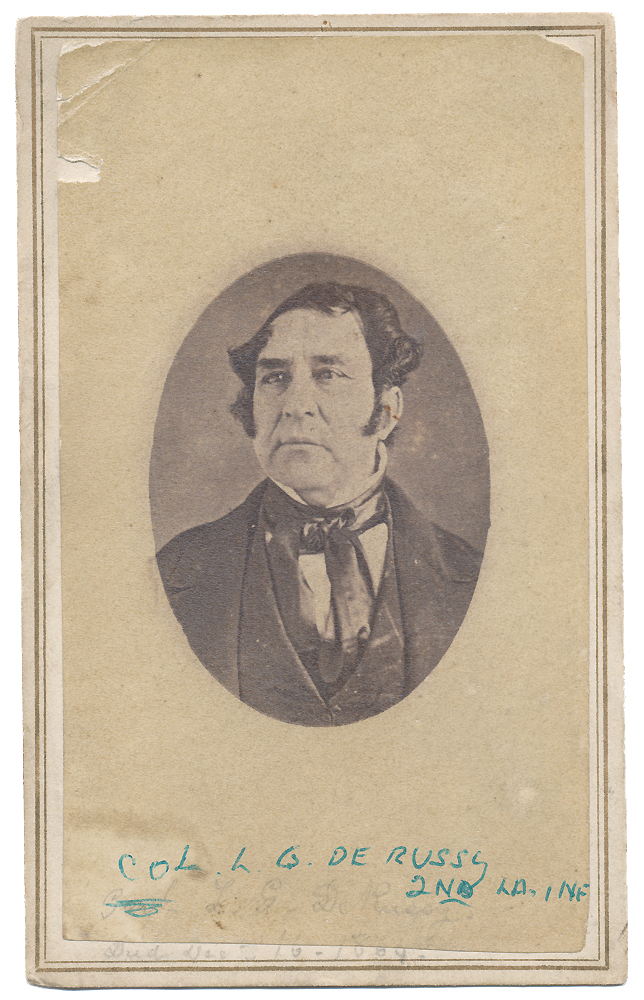
- Born: September 17, 1795; New York City, New York
- Died: December 17, 1864 (aged 69); Grand Ecore, Louisiana
- Military career
- Allegiance: United States; Confederate States
- Branch: United States Army; Louisiana Militia; Confederate States Army
- Service years: 1814–1842, 1846–1848 (USA); 1861–1864 (CSA)
- Rank: Colonel (USA); Major General (Militia); Colonel (CSA)
- Unit: U.S. Army Corps of Engineers
- Conflicts: War of 1812; Mexican–American War; American Civil War

Louis Gustave De Russy (1795 – December 17, 1864) was an engineer and career United States Army officer who served as Major-General in the Louisiana Militia during the American Civil War. He was the oldest West Point graduate to serve in the Confederacy in that war. He is the younger brother of René Edward De Russy, a U.S. brigadier general, who remained with the Union during the war.

Both men had forts named after them. That named for Louis is Fort DeRussy, constructed near Marksville, Louisiana during the Civil War.

== Life ==
De Russy was born in 1795 and grew up in New York City. His father Thomas De Russy had served in the French Navy, moving to the American Navy during the American Revolutionary War (France was at that point allied with the rebels). After returning to France, he left in 1786 as tensions were rising that led to the French Revolution and gone to family lands in Saint-Domingue, the wealthiest French colony in the Caribbean. He settled in Cap Français and married a French colonist, Madeleine Baissiere, there in 1787. Their first two sons, Rene Emile and René Edward De Russy, were born on the island. In 1792, the family had to leave quickly because the city was burning from the Haitian Revolution. They lost all their property but safely reached New York City.

== Military and engineering career ==
At the age of 18, after eleven months as a cadet, on March 11, 1814, De Russy graduated from the United States Military Academy at West Point, New York. The fact that the War of 1812 was still on may have accelerated his graduation. On January 7, 1816 he married Elizabeth Claire Boerum, from an old Dutch family. They eventually had seven children together before her death in 1836.

After being part of the surveying party to set the US-Canadian border in 1819–1821, De Russy had steady engineering assignments and advanced in his career. In September 1826, De Russy was promoted to major and assigned to the Red River outposts in central Louisiana. He and his family lived between Fort Jesup and Natchitoches. He had most of the remainder of his career and life in Louisiana.

De Russy was passed over and dropped from the Army in 1842, during a reduction in forces. He devoted himself to his plantation and to private engineering jobs. After serving as a major in the state militia, in December 1846 he joined the 1st Louisiana Regiment of Volunteers, being elected to the rank of colonel, and led the regiment in the Mexican War. In July 1847 they fought in the Battle of Tantayuka, their only combat. They were garrisoned at Tampico, where De Russy directed a project to improve traffic on the waterway.

After their return to Louisiana, he served as major general in the state militia. In 1851 he was elected to the state house and, at the end of the two-year term, to the state senate. He also worked on several major engineering projects and a survey of the Red River.

During the American Civil War, he served the Confederacy as Chief Engineer, working on projects near the Red River.

He died at his home on December 17, 1864; historians believe he had a heart attack.

== Legacy and honors ==
- Fort DeRussy, constructed during the Civil War near Marksville, Louisiana, was named for him.
