= Eli D. Hoyle =

United States Army general

Eli DuBose Hoyle
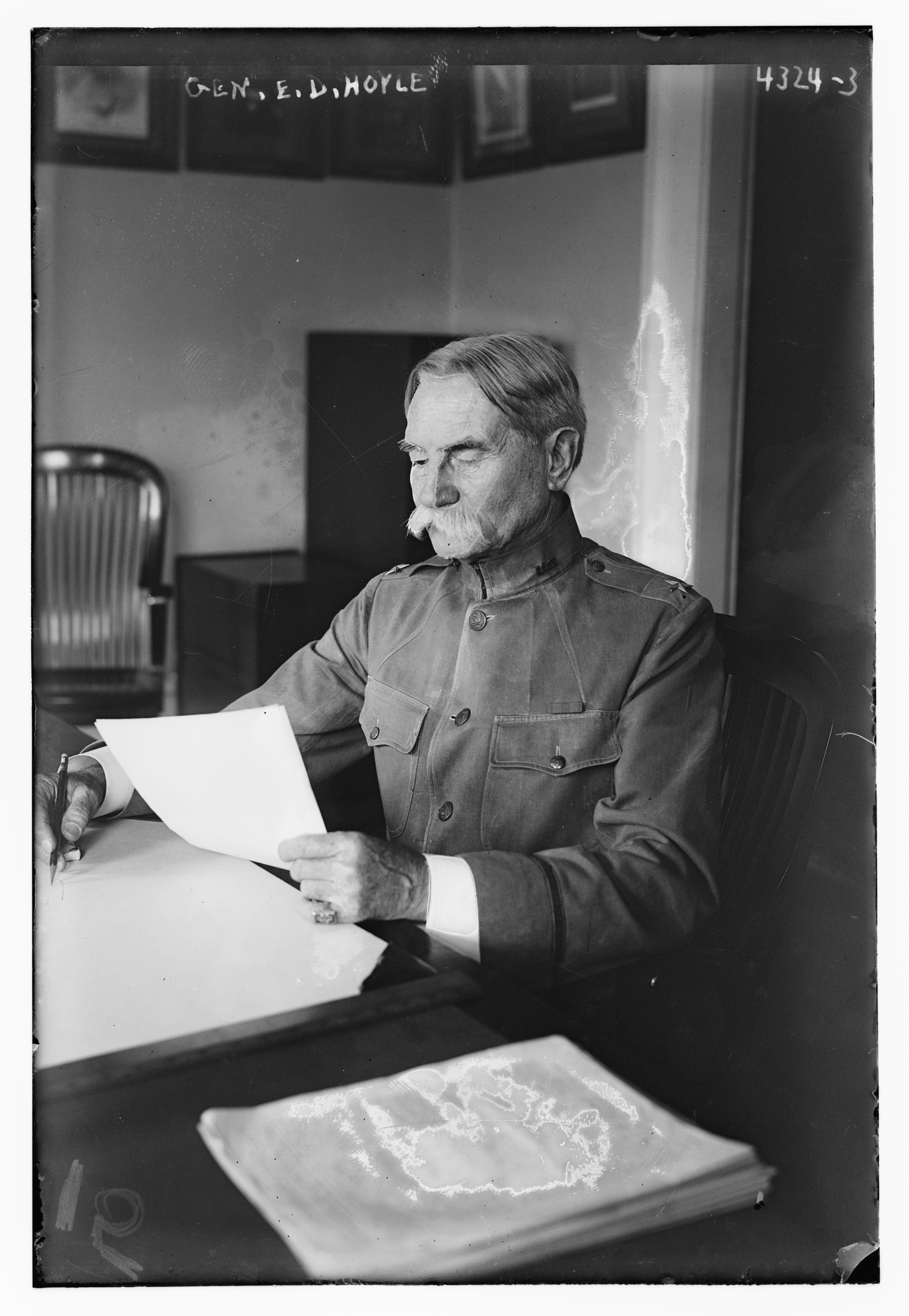
- Born: July 19, 1851; Canton, Georgia, US
- Died: July 27, 1921 (aged 70); Washington, D.C., US
- Spouse: Fanny De Russy
- Relatives: Five children, including MG Rene Edward De Russy Hoyle; BG René Edward De Russy (Father-in-Law)
- Military career
- Allegiance: United States of America
- Branch: United States Army
- Service years: 1875–1915; 1918–1919
- Rank: Brigadier general
- Commands: Battery L, 1st Field Artillery Regiment; Recruit Depot, Fort Slocum; 6th Field Artillery; 4th Field Artillery; Fort Riley; Central Department; 2nd Field Artillery; District of Luzon, Philippines; Fort William McKinley; Department of the East
- Conflicts: Spanish–American War; World War I
- Awards: Distinguished Service Medal; Soldier's Medal

Eli DuBose Hoyle (July 19, 1851 – July 27, 1921) was a brigadier general in the United States Army. He is most noted for his command of the port of embarkation at Governor's Island in New York Harbor during World War I, for which he received the Distinguished Service Medal and Soldier's Medal.

== Early life ==
Hoyle was born in Canton, Georgia, on July 19, 1851, the son of George Summers Hoyle and Margareth Amanda (Erwin) Hoyle.

Hoyle graduated from the United States Military Academy at West Point in 1875, and was commissioned as a second lieutenant of Field Artillery. His brother George S. Hoyle and he were notable as two of the first post-American Civil War West Point students from former Confederate states.

== Start of career ==
During Hoyle's early years in the Army his service included instructor at West Point; the military response to the Great Railroad Strike of 1877; and adjutant at West Point. During the Spanish–American War he served with 1st Division, 1st Corps in Puerto Rico, then as chief ordnance officer for 3d Division, 2d Corps in Athens, Georgia, and then as chief ordnance officer and provost marshal for the Department of Matanzas in Cuba, Feb. 2 to April 26, 1899.

== Effective dates of promotions ==
Hoyle was promoted to first lieutenant in 1883; captain in 1898; major (United States Volunteers) in 1898; major (regular Army) in 1903; lieutenant colonel in 1907; colonel in 1911; and brigadier general in 1913. He retired in 1915, but was recalled to active duty for World War I.

== Later career ==
His command assignments included Battery L, 1st Field Artillery Regiment (1899–1900); Recruit Depot at Fort Slocum (1908); 6th Field Artillery (1908–1911, 1911–1913); 4th Field Artillery (1911); Fort Riley (1912–1913); Central Department (1913); 2nd Field Artillery (1913); District of Luzon, Philippines (1913–1914); and Fort William McKinley (1914).

== World War I ==
During his World War I recall to active duty he was assigned as commander of the Department of the East, with primary responsibility for the Governor's Island Port of Embarkation in New York Harbor. Hoyle retired again in 1919. He was awarded the Army Distinguished Service Medal for his services during the war. The citation for the medal reads:

The President of the United States of America, authorized by Act of Congress, July 9, 1918, takes pride in presenting the Army Distinguished Service Medal (Posthumously) to Brigadier General Eli D. Hoyle, United States Army, for exceptionally meritorious and distinguished services to the Government of the United States, in a duty of great responsibility during World War I. As Department Commander, Eastern Department, between 25 August 1917 and 15 January 1918, General Hoyle handled many difficult problems arising in that department with rare judgment, tact, and great skill.

== Death and burial ==
Hoyle died in Washington, D.C., on July 27, 1921. He was buried at Arlington National Cemetery, Section 3, Grave 4442.

== Family ==
Hoyle was married to Fanny De Russy (1857–1925), the daughter of Brigadier General René Edward De Russy. Their son Rene Edward De Russy Hoyle (1883–1981) was a career Army officer who attained the rank of major general. The Hoyles were also the parents of four daughters, all of whom married West Point graduates: Helen Maxwell Hoyle Herr (1882–1971), the wife of John Knowles Herr; Imogene Hoyle Taulbee (1885–1982), the wife of Colonel Joseph Fulton Taulbee; Fanny DeRussy Hoyle Graham (1889–1981), the wife of Lieutenant Colonel Ephraim Foster Graham; and Margaret Hoyle Higley (1891–1988), the wife of Brigadier General Harvey D. Higley.

== Legacy ==
Fort Hoyle, an artillery post in Maryland which operated from 1922 to 1940, was named for him.
