= Arthur Murray (general) =

United States Army general

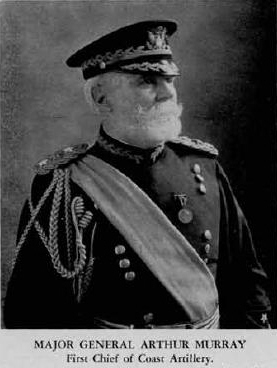
- Major General Arthur Murray, first Chief of Coast Artillery
- Born: April 29, 1851; Bowling Green, Missouri, US
- Died: May 12, 1925 (aged 74); Washington, D.C., US
- Burial place: Arlington National Cemetery
- Spouse: Sara Wetmore De Russy
- Relatives: Brigadier General René Edward De Russy (father in law); Major General Henry Conger Pratt (son in law); Major General Maxwell Murray (son)
- Military career
- Allegiance: United States of America
- Branch: United States Army
- Service years: 1874–1915; 1917–1918
- Rank: Major General
- Commands: Battery L, 1st Field Artillery; Battery A, 1st Field Artillery; 43rd Infantry Regiment; School of Submarine Defense; Field Artillery Corps; Coast Artillery Corps; Western Department
- Conflicts: Spanish–American War; Philippine Insurrection; World War I
- Awards: Distinguished Service Medal
- Other work: Vice Chairman, Central Committee, American Red Cross; Clerk, U.S. House Committee on Military Affairs

Arthur Murray (April 29, 1851 – May 12, 1925) was a career U.S. Army artillery officer and major general in the United States Army. He was notable for his service as Chief of Artillery for the United States Army Artillery Corps, and the first Chief of United States Army Coast Artillery.

Murray served primarily in artillery command and staff assignments, with one exception being his command of the 43rd U.S. Volunteer Infantry Regiment during the Philippine Insurrection. Following his retirement in 1915, Murray returned to active duty during World War I. He served as commander of the Army's Western Department from 1917 until retiring again in 1918.

== Early life and career ==
Murray was born in Bowling Green, Missouri, on April 29, 1851. He attended the United States Military Academy at West Point, New York, ranked second in the Class of 1874. After graduation, he was commissioned as a second lieutenant with the 1st U.S. Artillery, serving in Florida, South Carolina, and Rhode Island, and later in Pennsylvania during the Army's response to the Great Railroad Strike of 1877. He was promoted to first lieutenant in June 1878, and in 1880 he graduated from the Fort Monroe, Virginia U.S. Army Field Artillery School and was ranked first in his class.

He served at West Point as an instructor of natural and experimental philosophy between 1881 and 1885, and following a yearlong posting at the Presidio in San Francisco, California, in 1886, was in 1887 assigned to the U.S. Army Judge Advocate General's office for the Department of the Missouri. He later served in the Judge Advocate's office for the Department of Dakota. Murray studied law during his Judge Advocate General postings and was admitted to the bar.

From 1891 to 1896, Murray was commander of Battery L, 1st Artillery at Fort Wadsworth, New York. He then served at Yale University as a professor of military science from 1896 to 1898.

== Later career ==
=== Spanish-American War ===
At the outbreak of the Spanish–American War, Murray was assigned command of Battery A, 1st U.S. Artillery in Key West. Florida on April 18, 1898. He subsequently served as judge advocate for First Army Corps on campaign in Cuba. After the war, Murray held several positions in Cuba as part of the U.S. Army's occupation government before returning to Washington, D.C., in May 1899.

=== Philippine Insurrection ===
In August 1899, Murray accepted command of the 43rd United States Volunteer Infantry Regiment with the temporary rank of colonel. He organized the regiment at Fort Ethan Allen, Vermont, and led it to the Philippine Islands in November 1899. The 43rd Infantry was in action during the Philippine Insurrection between 1900 and 1901, arriving in Manila in late-December 1899, and was present for much of the bloody counterinsurgency fighting on Luzon, Samar, and Leyte Islands between January and May 1900. From June 1900 to June, 1901 Murray served as commander of the 1st District of the Department of the Visayas.

=== Commandant of the School of Submarine Defense ===
On August 22, 1901, Murray was promoted to major in the Artillery Corps. From 1901 to 1906, he was commandant of the Army's School of Submarine Defense. The school's purpose was to devise and implement methods of defending American harbors from attack by enemy ships, including the employment of underwater mines and torpedoes. During Murray's tenure, the school was relocated to Fort Monroe, which was also the home of the U.S. Army's Artillery School.

Her served as president of Torpedo Board beginning on October 3, 1901, and was detailed as member of the Board of Engineers in July 1903. Murray was also in charge of the submarine mine defenses of Long Island, New York; Portland, Maine; Fort Monroe, Virginia; Baltimore, Maryland; and Washington, D.C., during the Army-Navy maneuvers of 1902, 1903, and 1905. On April 14, 1905, Murray was promoted to lieutenant colonel.

=== Chief of Artillery and retirement ===
On October 1, 1906, Murray was promoted simultaneously to colonel and brigadier general, selected to fill the position of Chief of Artillery in Washington, D.C.

In 1908, the Artillery Corps was divided into the Coast Artillery Corps and the Field Artillery, The companies of the Artillery Corps were reorganized as units of either the U.S. Army Field Artillery (mobile light artillery units trained for ground warfare) or U.S Army Coast Artillery (tasked with the defense of static heavy coast artillery installations constructed to defend American harbors). Murray was named the first Chief of Coast Artillery. He used his time in the post on major activities including inspection of the newly-constructed Taft-era coast artillery defenses of the Philippine Islands, Hawaiian Islands, and Pacific Coast of the United States, and served until March 1911.

Murray was promoted to major general on March 13, 1911, and assigned command of the U.S. Army's Western Department. He served in this post until his retirement on December 4, 1915.

=== Return to service in World War I ===
Following the American entry into the First World War, Murray returned to service as a major general on August 21, 1917. He commanded the U.S. Army's Western Department from September 6, 1917, until retiring again in May 1918. Murray was awarded the Distinguished Service Medal in recognition of his contributions to the war effort. The citation for the medal reads:

The President of the United States of America, authorized by Act of Congress, July 9, 1918, takes pleasure in presenting the Army Distinguished Service Medal to Major General Arthur Murray, United States Army, for exceptionally meritorious and distinguished services to the Government of the United States, in a duty of great responsibility during World War I. As Department Commander, Western Department, between 29 August 1917 and 14 May 1918, General Murray handled many difficult problems arising in that department with rare judgment, tact, and great skill.

=== Civilian career ===
In his early retirement, Murray served as vice chairman of the Central Committee of the American Red Cross in Washington, D.C., between December 1915 and December 1916.

In December 1918, Murray was appointed clerk of the U.S. House Committee on Military Affairs.

== Death and burial ==
Murray died in Washington, D.C., on May 12, 1925, at the age of 74.

He was buried at Arlington National Cemetery, in Section 3, Site 1844B.

== Personal life ==
In 1880, Murray married Sara Wetmore De Russy, the daughter of Brigadier General René Edward De Russy.

His son, Maxwell Murray, was a career U.S. Army officer who attained the rank of major general.

His daughter, Sara Murray, was the wife of Major General Henry Conger Pratt.

His daughter, Carolyn Murray, was married to Ord Preston, a prominent Washington, D.C., businessman who served as president of the Washington Gas Light Company and the Union Trust Company, and also served as a major in the U.S. Army during World War I.

== Awards ==
- Distinguished Service Medal
- Spanish War Service Medal
- Army of Cuban Occupation Medal
- Philippine Campaign Medal
- World War I Victory Medal
