= René Edward De Russy =

American army engineer and educator (1789–1865)

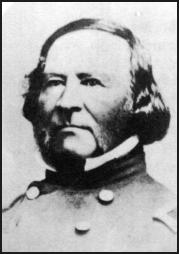
- Brig. Gen. René Edward de Russy
- Born: February 22, 1789; Saint-Domingue (now Haiti)
- Died: November 23, 1865 (aged 76); San Francisco, California, U.S.
- Burial place: West Point Cemetery
- Military career
- Allegiance: United States of America
- Branch: United States Army; Union Army
- Service years: 1812 - 1865
- Rank: Colonel; Brevet Brigadier General
- Unit: United States Army Corps of Engineers
- Commands: Superintendent of the United States Military Academy
- Conflicts: War of 1812; Battle of Crysler's Farm; Battle of Lacolle Mills (1814); Battle of Plattsburgh; American Civil War

René Edward De Russy (February 22, 1789 – November 23, 1865) was an engineer, military educator, and career United States Army officer who was responsible for constructing many Eastern United States coastal fortifications, as well as some forts on the West Coast. He also served as superintendent of the United States Military Academy. He was promoted to brigadier general during the American Civil War.

== Early life ==
René Edward De Russy was born into a family of ethnic French planters in the French colony of Saint-Domingue (now Haiti) on February 22, 1789. Two years later, soon after the birth of his younger brother Lewis, the De Russy family fled the violence of the slave revolution and settled in Old Point Comfort, Virginia.

At the age of 18, De Russy enrolled in the United States Military Academy at West Point, New York on March 20, 1807; he graduated on June 10, 1812, last in his class.

== Career ==
After West Point, De Russy worked as the assistant engineer for New York State's defenses and helped to build Fort Montgomery, Rouses Point on the Canada–US border. In the late 1810s, he became the Superintending Engineer of the defenses of New York Harbor. He was next assigned to the South, where he oversaw construction of forts along the Gulf of Mexico, serving from 1821 to 1825.

In 1825, De Russy returned to New York City, where he continued to build the Harbor's defenses, specifically Fort Hamilton. The Brooklyn Eagle reported that De Russy was the "engineer under whose direction Fort Hamilton was built, the corner stone of which was laid on June 11, 1825, and which was first garrisoned by troops on November 1, 1831." During his assignment in New York City, De Russy supervised the construction of the New Utrecht Reformed Church. He built his own residence on a hill in Brooklyn, which the Brooklyn Eagle referred to as "The Lookout" because of its position above New York harbor, on a ridge that became known as Dyker Heights at the end of the 19th century.

On July 1, 1833, De Russy was assigned as Superintendent of the United States Military Academy, which he led for five years. He was next assigned to supervising fort construction in Virginia and Delaware. Because of this experience, De Russy served as a member of the Atlantic Coast Defense Board from 1849 until 1854, when he was sent to San Francisco. He continued to build military forts and was named to the Pacific Coast Defense Board. In 1857, he was reassigned to the Atlantic Coast, returning to San Francisco in 1861. He died in San Francisco in 1865.

De Russy was credited with inventing the barbette depressing gun carriage.

In recognition of his service, on July 17, 1866, De Russy was posthumously nominated by President Andrew Johnson for appointment to the grade of brevet brigadier general in the Regular US Army, to rank from March 13, 1865, and the United States Senate approved the appointment on July 26, 1866.

== Personal life ==
De Russy was married to Harriet Elizabeth Taylor (1805–1834). Together, they were the parents of the following:

- Gustavus Adolphus De Russy (1818–1891), who became a brigadier general, serving as quartermaster at Fort Monroe from 1848 until 1857. He married Frances Clitz (1836–1901), sister of John Mellen Brady Clitz (1821–1897), commander of the Asiatic Squadron.
- John Allen De Russy (1826–1850), also served in the military; died at Fort Monroe in Virginia in 1850.
- Clara Louise De Russy (1829–1900), married William Augustus Nichols (1818–1869)
- Emily Caroline De Russy (1831–1857), who married Henry Jackson Hunt (1819–1889), who became a brigadier general.

De Russy then married Ann Alida Denniston, daughter of Isaac Denniston (1767–1852.) Their son was Isaac Denniston De Russy (1840–1923), who became a brigadier general. He married Laura Requa (1859–1929). Their son Rene Edward De Russy Jr (1844–1895) served in the Army Artillery 1863–1874. Ann died in March 1849 at Fortress Munroe.

After Ann's early death, De Russy married Helen Augusta Maxwell (1832–1908). Together, they were the parents of the following:

- Laura De Russy (1853–1923); she married Washington Berry (1851–1921) in 1876.
- Helen Maxwell De Russy (1856–1901), who married Charles Hobart Clark (1851–1915) in a double wedding with her younger sister Sara.
- Fanny De Russy (1857–1925), who married Eli DuBose Hoyle (1851–1921), who became a brigadier general. Their son Rene Edward De Russy Hoyle (1883–1981) also became a brigadier general.
- Sara Wetmore De Russy (1860–1926), who married Arthur Murray (1851–1925); a career officer, he became a major general. They had a double wedding with her older sister Helen. Their son Maxwell Murray (1885–1948) also had a military career, becoming a major general. He commanded the 25th Infantry Division in Honolulu during the Attack on Pearl Harbor.

The senior De Russy "died while on active duty at San Francisco on November 23, 1865, aged 75 years, the oldest graduate of the Military Academy on active duty." He was originally buried at the Lone Mountain Cemetery on November 25, 1865. During the decommissioning of that cemetery, De Russy's remains were moved to Cypress Lawn Memorial Park in 1901 and then reburied at the United States Military Academy Post Cemetery on October 24, 1907.

=== Legacy ===
There are five Forts DeRussy in the United States: Fort DeRussy Military Reservation in Honolulu, two in Louisiana, one in Kentucky, and one in Washington, D.C. The latter four were all built during the American Civil War. All of the forts were named for two brothers, René Edward and his younger brother Louis Gustave De Russy. Louis (also known as Lewis) graduated in 1814 from the United States Military Academy, two years after René but on an accelerated schedule. An engineer and career officer, he was assigned to Red River outposts in Louisiana in 1826 and made much of his career in that state.

At advanced ages, they served on opposite sides of the Civil War: René on the Union side and Lewis as a colonel in the Confederate Army; he was the oldest West Point graduate to serve on the Confederate side.

- DeRussy Drive on Dyker Heights was named for Rene E. DeRussy, who built a house there while stationed in New York.

== See also ==
- Brooklyn Eagle
- Dyker Heights Historical Society

Military offices
Preceded by Sylvanus Thayer	Superintendents of the United States Military Academy; 1833–1838	Succeeded by Richard Delafield
