= Arthur L. McCullough =

United States Air Force general

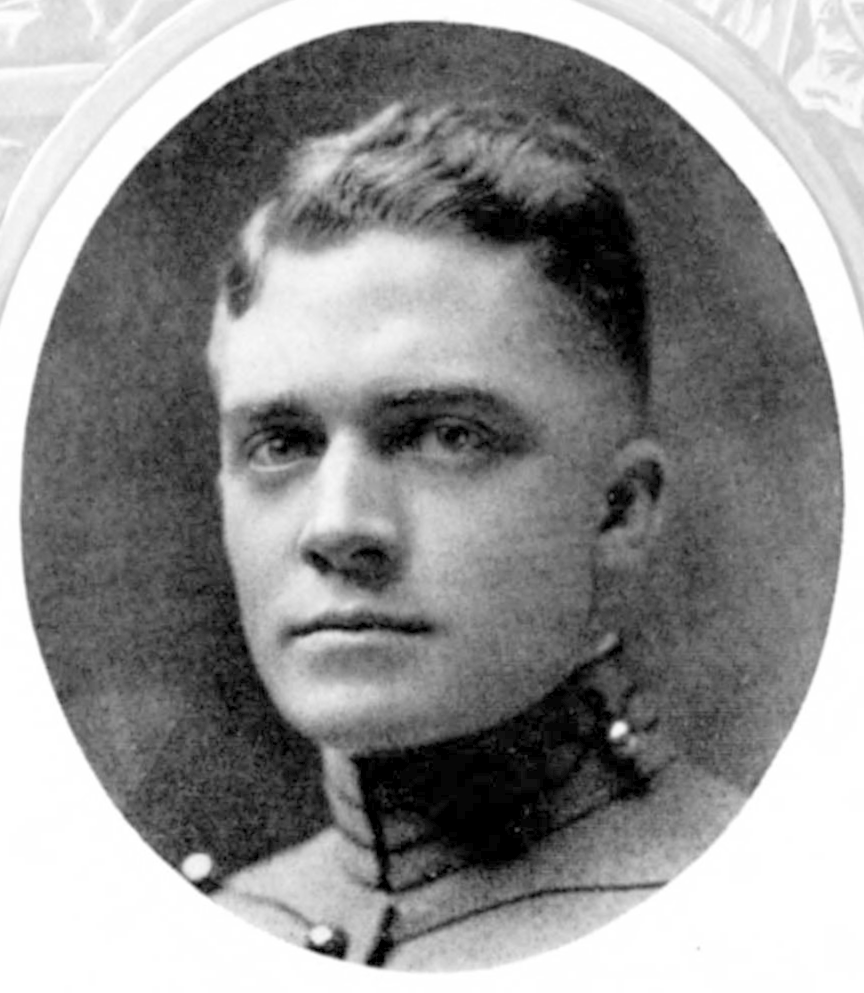
- At West Point in 1920
- Born: Arthur Lee McCullough; December 3, 1896; Milwaukee, Wisconsin
- Died: January 6, 1979 (aged 82)
- Allegiance: United States
- Service years: 1920-1946
- Conflicts: Allied invasion of Sicily
- Awards: Legion of Merit; Bronze Star Medal; Air Medal

Arthur Lee McCullough (December 3, 1896 – January 6, 1979) was a brigadier general in the United States Air Force.

== Biography ==
McCullough was born in Milwaukee, Wisconsin, in 1896. He attended Rensselaer Polytechnic Institute.

== Career ==
McCullough graduated from the United States Military Academy in 1920 and was assigned to the United States Army Corps of Engineers. He transferred to the Air Corps in 1925. During World War II, he took part in the Allied invasion of Sicily. Following the war, he was given command of the 514th Troop Carrier Wing, the 313th Troop Carrier Wing, and was assigned to Continental Air Command.

Awards he received include the Legion of Merit, the Bronze Star Medal, and the Air Medal with oak leaf cluster.
