= Fort Custer (Montana) =

Coordinates: 45°43′37″N 107°34′28″W

- Crow Indian Reservation, Big Horn County, about 1 mile west of I-90 and 2 miles southeast of Hardin, Montana

Site information
- Controlled by: United States

Site history
- Built: 1877
- In use: 1877–1898
- Battles/wars: Indian Wars

Garrison information
- Past commanders: Lieut.-Colonel George P. Buell, 11th Infantry; Captain George K. Sanderson, Company C, 11th Infantry; Colonel Albert G. Brackett, 2nd Cavalry; Lt. Col. Andrew J. Alexander 2nd Cavalry; Colonel John P. Hatch, 2nd Cavalry; Colonel Nathan Dudley, 1st Cavalry; Colonel Abraham K. Arnold, 1st Cavalry; Lieut.-Colonel David Perry, 10th Cavalry; Major Stevens Thompson Norvell, 10th Cavalry; Lt. Col. Arron S. Daggett, 25th Infantry; Lieut. Samuel D. Freeman, 10th Cavalry
- Garrison: Second Cavalry; First Cavalry; Tenth Cavalry

Fort Custer was established during the Indian wars in the Department of Dakota by the U.S. Army to subjugate the Sioux, Cheyenne and Crow Indians near present-day Hardin, Montana. The post was named for General George Armstrong Custer who died at the Battle of the Little Big Horn.

== Construction ==
In April and May, 1877, three companies (C, F and G) were moved from Cheyenne Agency, and three companies ( A, B and H) from Fort Yates in the Standing Rock Agency to the Little Big Horn, Montana, under the command of Lieut.-Colonel G. P. Buell, 11th Infantry, where they constructed the post of Fort Custer.

On June 9, 1877, Lieut. Col. Geo. P. Buell and 2 companies Eleventh Infantry (C and F), together with a number of mechanics, arrived, per steamer Florence Meyer, en route to build Post No. 2 on the Bighorn River.

The construction of Fort Custer, on the Big Horn, was entrusted to Lieutenant-Colonel G. P. Buell, of the Eleventh Infantry. Colonel Buell, with four companies of his regiment and a large force of mechanics and laborers, left Bismarck by steamers for the site of the post on the 16th of May. Owing to the wretched character of his boats, and to an accident which happened to one of them, he did not reach his destination until the 23d of June. Subsequently two additional companies of his regiment were sent to him. It had been determined to build this post from material to be found in the country; and as soon as Colonel Buell had put up temporary storehouses to protect his supplies, he commenced cutting logs, baking brick, and sawing lumber. The lumber in this immediate vicinity is cotton wood, and, with the exception of some finishing lumber—pine—sent up from Bismarck, the post was built of this material. The post is intended for the same number and description of troops as Fort Keogh. The buildings are not framed, but they are built up of planks two inches thick by six inches wide, laid flat one upon another, forming a solid wall six inches in thickness. The officers' quarters are of one story and an attic. All other buildings are of one story.

The site of the post is on an extensive elevated plateau in the fork of two streams. Colonel Buell was originally instructed to place it on the left bank of the Bighorn, as near to the mouth of the Little Bighorn as the nature of the ground would permit. Immediately after his arrival he made a thorough examination of the whole neighborhood, and became so well satisfied of the superior advantages of the plateau in the fork over any other possible situation, that he selected it as the site. His action in this respect was subsequently fully approved. Many unforeseen obstacles delayed the completion of the post; but its construction is so far advanced, that the garrison, its animals and supplies, will be well sheltered during the winter. Lieutenant-Colonel Buell deserves great credit for the activity, energy, and resource which he has displayed.

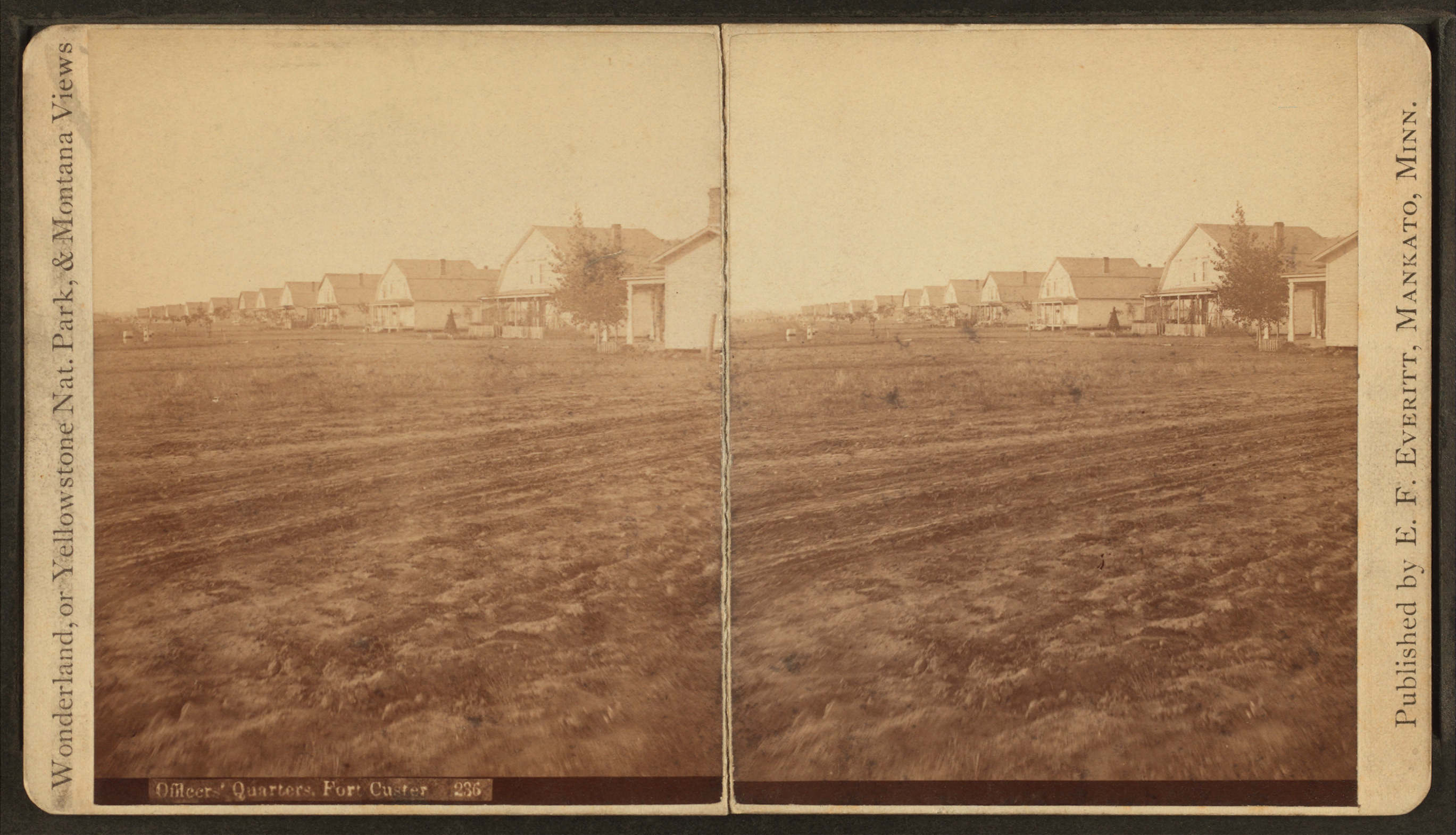
Officer's quarters, Fort Custer

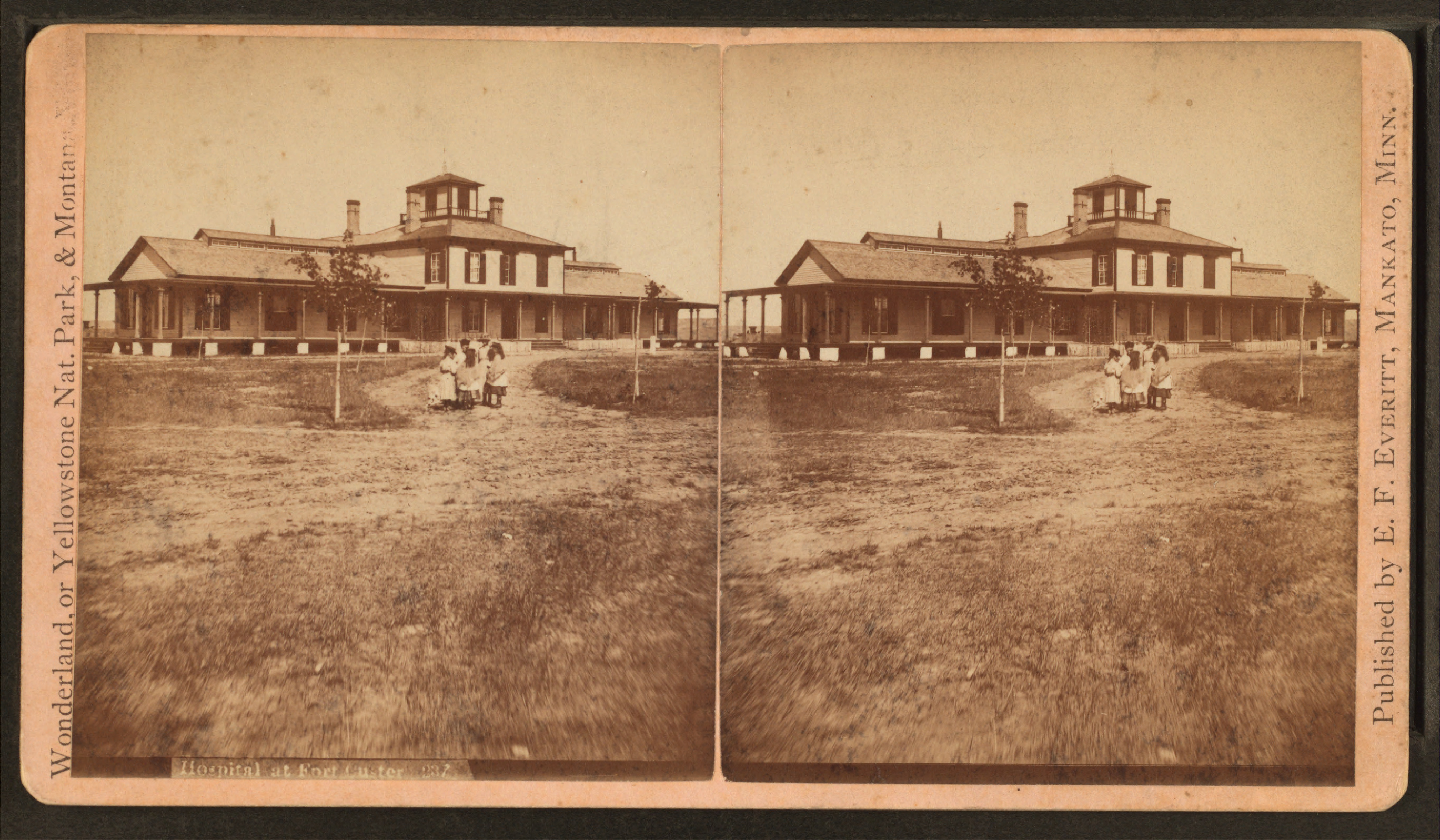
Hospital at Fort Custer

Fort Custer had quarters for 10 companies including stables for 6 troops of cavalry. It was built with buildings surrounding a large parade ground but had no walls or other fortifications

== Naming ==
Fort Custer was originally called Post No. 2 on the Bighorn River.

General Orders, No. 1

Headquarters Big Horn Post, Mont.,

July 4, 1877.

Until the post be named officially, in orders from higher authority, it will be known as Big Horn Post, and the military reservation pertaining to it is hereby declared as 20 miles square, the center of which will be the flag-staff, the sides running north, east, south, and west.

Geo. P. Buell, Lieutenant-Colonel Eleventh Infantry, Commanding Post.

At the Bighorn Post, Lieutenant General Sheridan and Brigadier General Crook deliberated over the status of the forts and what to name them.

In General Sherman's report to Secretary of War George W. McCrary regarding this matter stated:

We have discussed the subject of names for the new post I suggested the names of Custer... I find General Terry indisposed thus to Honor Genl. Custer, ...I think General Sheridan agrees with me, still we dislike to act without General Terry's consent.

The designation of the post was changed to Fort Custer, pursuant to General Orders, No. 101, Headquarters of the Army, Adjutant General's Office, November 8, 1877.

== History ==
Most of the Native Americans in the vicinity had been confined to reservations, when the fort was built. The Second Cavalry Regimental Headquarters, Band, and Companies C, D, K, and M were stationed at Fort Custer first in November 1877, along with Companies B, C, F, and H of the 11th Infantry. The fort supplied troops for some of the Plains campaigns, including the Bannock War.

=== Custer battlefield ===
It was from Fort Custer that Captain George K. Sanderson, Company C, Eleventh Infantry, was sent to the Custer battlefield to police and rebury any exposed remains in April 1879.

Then on January 28, 1881, Lieutenant Charles Francis Roe and Troop M, Second Cavalry, left Fort Custer for the battle-field on the Little Big Horn River, in charge of the materials for the monument to be erected to the officers and men who fell in that action.

=== First Cavalry ===
In 1884 the First Cavalry headquarters and troops D, G, I, K and M, were stationed at Fort Custer replacing the Second Cavalry and joining Companies I and H of the Fifth Infantry and E and K of the Seventeenth Infantry.

Yellowstone National Park turned to the U.S. Army for help, and in 1886 men from Company M, First United States Cavalry, and Fort Custer, Montana Territory under Captain Moses Harris came to Yellowstone to begin what would be more than 30 years of military presence in Yellowstone.

There was an uprising at the Crow Agency in the fall of 1887, and on the morning of November 4, Colonel Nathan Dudley left Fort Custer with Troops A, B, D, E, G and K, and Company B, 3d Infantry, with a section of Hotchkiss guns, to arrest "Sword Bearer" and the Native Americans who had fired into the agency buildings on the night of September 30. On December 31, 1889 Headquarters and Troops B, D, E, G and M, were at Fort Custer.

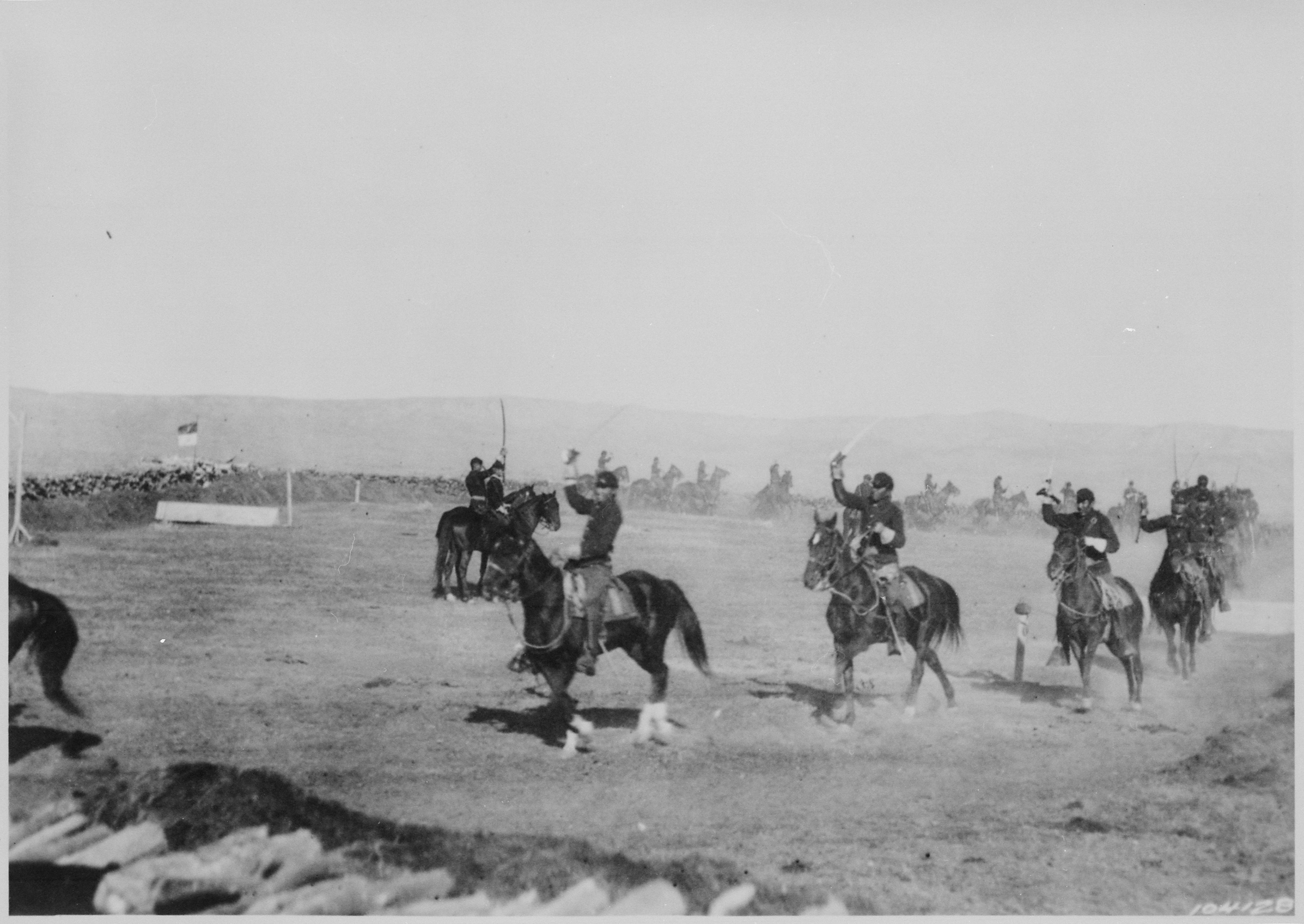
Saber Exercises, Crow Indian Troop 1st Cavalry, Ft. Custer Montana 1892

On April 20, 1892, Headquarters and troops A, B, E, G, K, and M, First Cavalry, Col. A. K. Arnold commanding, left Fort Custer.

=== Buffalo Soldiers ===
On May 5, 1892, Headquarters and Troops B, E, G, and K, Tenth Cavalry, Lieut. Col. David Perry commanding, arrived at Fort Custer; Troop A, being dismounted, marched from Custer Station and arrived at post May 8, coming from the Department of Arizona, and took station. The nickname Buffalo Soldier was given to the Black Cavalry by the Native American tribes they fought; the term eventually became synonymous with all of the African-American regiments formed in 1866.

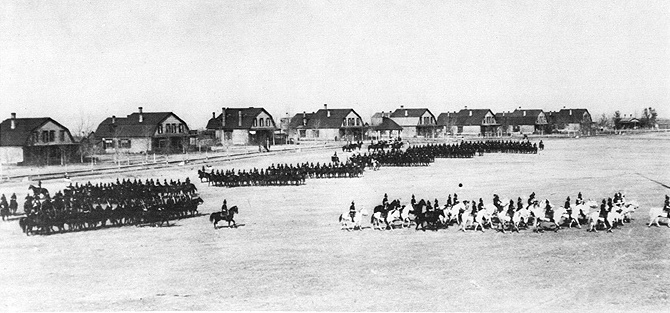
10th Cavalry parade at Fort Custer

Troops A, B, E, and K, Tenth Cavalry and Companies B and D Twenty-fifth Infantry left Fort Custer and were sent to Fort Harrison near Helena when the post closed on April 17, 1898 and the buildings were sold and used to build Hardin, Montana. A Daughters of the American Revolution marker designates the site, within the boundaries of the Crow Indian Reservation on an abandoned golf course. All that remains are scattered cellars and ground depressions. It is located just off of I-90 (U.S. Hwy 87) south of Hardin, Montana, where the Hwy crosses the Big Horn River.

A remnant of the fort can be found in the town of Fort Smith, Montana as a Bed and breakfast managed by the Crow Indians as well as a replica of the fort at the Bighorn County Historical Museum.

== See also ==
- Department of Dakota Forts
- List of military installations in Montana
