= Saint-Esprit =

Saint-Esprit may refer to:

- Saint-Esprit, Martinique, France
- Saint-Esprit, Quebec, Canada
- Saint-Esprit, Paris, a Catholic church in Paris, France
- French Church du Saint-Esprit, a French-speaking Episcopal church in New York City, United States, with Huguenot origins
- French ship Saint-Esprit, ship of the French Navy
