= Schoonmaker =

Schoonmaker is a surname. Notable people with the surname include:

- Augustus Schoonmaker Jr. (1828–1894), American lawyer and politician, New York State Attorney General from 1877 to 1879
- Cornelius Corneliusen Schoonmaker (1745–1796), American politician
- Frank Schoonmaker (1905–1976), American author and wine merchant
- James Martinus Schoonmaker, (1842–1927), American railroad executive
- Luke Schoonmaker (born 1998), American football player
- Marius Schoonmaker (1811–1894), American politician, grandson of Cornelius
- Martinus Schoonmaker (1737–1824), Dutch-American clergyman
- Thelma Schoonmaker (born 1940), American film editor

== See also ==
- Schumacher
