= George K. Sanderson =

US Army officer (1844–1893)

George Kaiser Sanderson
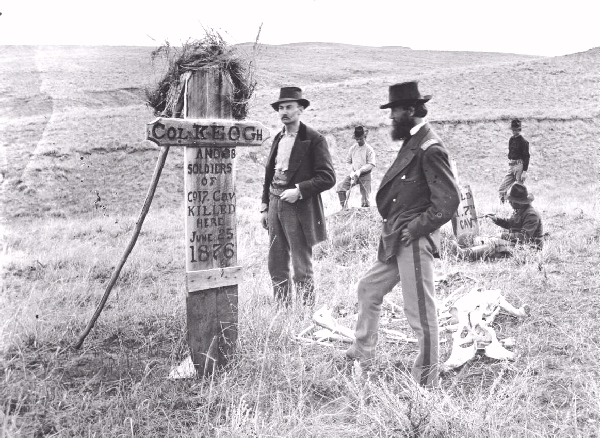
- 1879 photograph of CPT George K. Sanderson examining the marker erected where COL Myles Keogh and most of his company died during Battle of the Little Bighorn
- Born: September 9, 1844; Lebanon County, Pennsylvania
- Died: February 2, 1893 (aged 48); Lampasas, Texas
- Relatives: John P. Sanderson
- Military career
- Allegiance: United States of America; Union
- Branch: United States Army; Union Army
- Service years: 1861–1891
- Rank: Major
- Unit: 15th U.S. Infantry 33rd U.S. Infantry 11th U.S. Infantry 18th U.S. Infantry
- Commands: Fort Custer (Montana) Fort Ontario
- Conflicts: American Civil War: Battle of Shiloh; Battle of Chickamauga; Atlanta campaign; Indian Wars: Red River War; Great Sioux War of 1876-77
- Awards: Breveted 1st Lt. and Capt. for gallant and meritorious service.

George Kaiser Sanderson (September 9, 1844 – February 2, 1893) was a career U.S. Army officer. Having enlisted as a Private he was later commissioned and twice breveted for gallant and meritorious service during the American Civil War.

Sanderson was the first to erect a monument at the site of the Battle of the Little Bighorn, where the Little Bighorn Battlefield National Monument currently stands.

== Early life and family ==
Sanderson was born in Lebanon County, Pennsylvania, where his father, John P. Sanderson, was a newspaper editor and elected politician. He grew up mostly in Philadelphia, where his father continued in the newspaper business and practiced law. His first wife was named Mattie. George married Emeline Buford, daughter of Thomas Jefferson and Grace B. Buford, June 6, 1888, Rock Island County, Illinois.

== Civil War ==
Sanderson enlisted as a private in the 15th U.S. Infantry on October 24, 1861. His father John P. Sanderson was already a lieutenant colonel of this regiment serving form from May 14, 1861, until July 4, 1863. He was commissioned 2nd Lieutenant on October 31, 1861. He received a brevet as 1st Lieutenant on April 7, 1862, for gallant and meritorious service in the Battle of Shiloh Tennessee. He was promoted to 1st Lieutenant in the Regular Army on November 9, 1862. Sanderson received a second brevet as captain on September 1, 1864, for gallant and meritorious service during the Atlanta campaign.

Sanderson served as a staff officer in the position of Regiment Quartermaster, Fifteenth U.S. Infantry, from April 6, 1865, until March 28, 1866, when he was promoted to Captain. He later served again as a staff officer as assistant commissary of musters and acting aide-de-camp, from November 11 to December 30, 1867.

=== 33rd Infantry ===
Organized May 4, 1861, by direction of the President, as the Third Battalion, Fifteenth Infantry, and designated Thirty-Third Infantry, September 21, 1866, under the act of July 28, 1866. The regiment was consolidated May 3, 1869, under the act of March 3, 1869, with the Eighth Regiment of Infantry.

Captain Sanderson was transferred to 33rd U.S. Infantry 21 Sept 1866 and served as Acting Assistant Adjutant-General (AAAG), on the staff of Brevet Major General Pope commanding, Third Military District, at Headquarters (Atlanta, Georgia). He was listed as unassigned May 3, 1869.

== Indian Wars ==
Sanderson was assigned to 11th U.S. Infantry on 18 Dec 1869, and was stationed in the Department of Texas.

=== Department of Texas ===
On July 26, 1874, the Commissioner of Indian Affairs, Edward P. Smith, instructed Colonel Davidson to enroll the non-hostile Indians at the Comanche-Kiowa agency by August 3, 1874. Davidson assigned Captain G. K. Sanderson to perform this duty in effect removing Indian Agent James H. Haworth almost entirely from the enrollment. Captain Sanderson first went to the Comanche village ten miles north of Fort Sill, Indian Territories, where he enrolled the bands of Horseback, Quirts Quip, and Cheevers. The next day he went to the Kiowa camp but Kicking Bird could not get enough of his men for enrollment. Captain Sanderson told Kicking Bird to bring his men to the agency the following day for enrollment. The Kiowas came on August 3, but Ma-ye-tin, or Woman's Heart caused enough trouble that Captain Sanderson wanted him arrested but agent Haworth was against it. On August 8 the Yamparika were enrolled under the supervision of Captain Sanderson.

=== Department of Dakota ===
The first reinforcements from the Department of Texas for the Great Sioux War of 1876-77, were two companies under Captain Sanderson, which arrived on August 26, 1876, when he assumed command of the Post at Cheyenne River Agency, Dakota Territory (later called Fort Bennett).

Headquarters Department Of Dakota, Judge-advocate's Office, Saint Paul, Minn., September 13, 1879.

Capt. George K. Sanderson, Eleventh Infantry. Tried at Fort Keogh, Mont., by the general court-martial, appointed by Special Orders Nos. 91 and 93, series of 1878, from these headquarters, and of which Col. Nelson A. Miles, Fifth Infantry, was president. Proceedings promulgated in General Court-Martial Orders No. 97, of December 24, 1878, from these headquarters. Acquitted. Findings not approved.

==== First Custer battlefield memorial ====
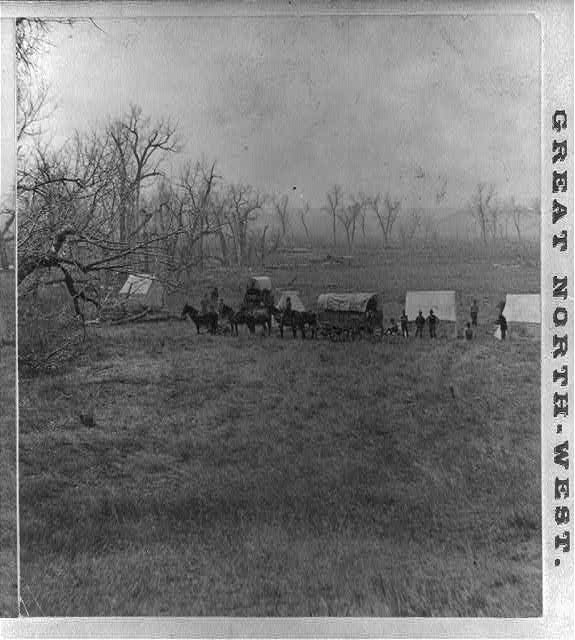
Capt. Sanderson's Camp at the ford, while gathering the bones, and building the Monument, Montana.

The first memorial on the site of the Little Bighorn Battlefield National Monument was assembled by Captain George K. Sanderson and the 11th Infantry.

In a letter dated October 29, 1878, Major George D. Ruggles, acting adjutant general, Department of Dakota, directed Lieutenant Colonel George P. Buell, commanding officer of Fort Custer, to send an expedition to the Little Bighorn to secure all human bones within a cone or pyramid of stones, adding, " The Department Commander thinks that the most suitable location for the grave is the highest point of the ridge just in rear of where General George Custer's body was found."

Fort Custer, M.T. April 7, 1879 Post Adjutant

Sir: I have the honor to report that in obedience to instructions I went to Custer Battlefield to carry out orders in regard to the graves at that point. I found it impossible to obtain rock within a distance of five miles. I accordingly built a mound out of cord wood filled in the center with all the horse bones I could find on the field. In the center of the mound I dug a grave and interred all the human bones that could be found, in all parts of four or five different bodies. This grave was then built up with wood for four feet above the ground, well covered, and the mound built over and around it. The mound is ten feet square and about eleven feet high; is built on the highest point immediately in rear of where Gen'l Custer's body was found.

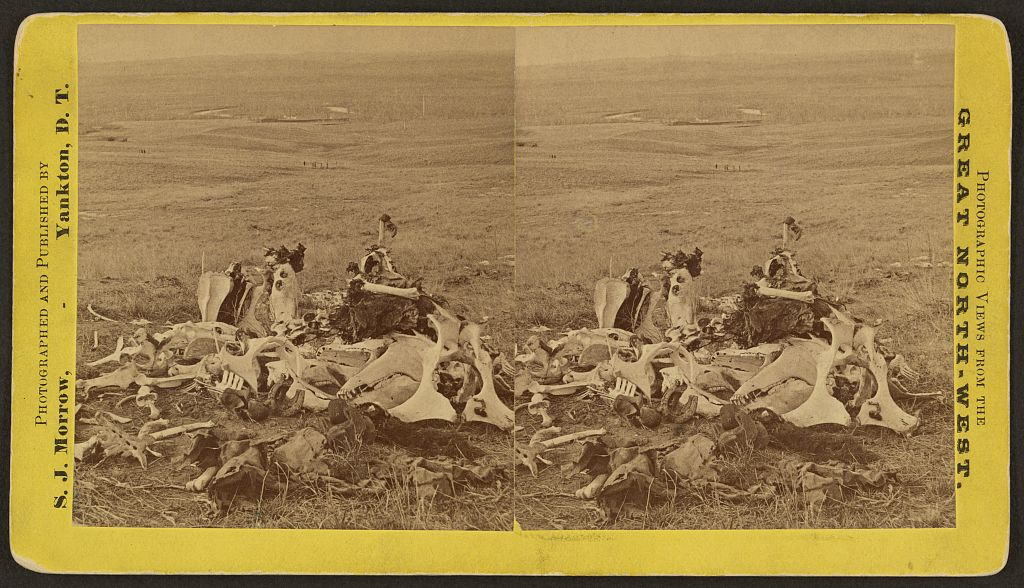
Gen'l Custer's last stand, looking in the direction of ford and Indian village

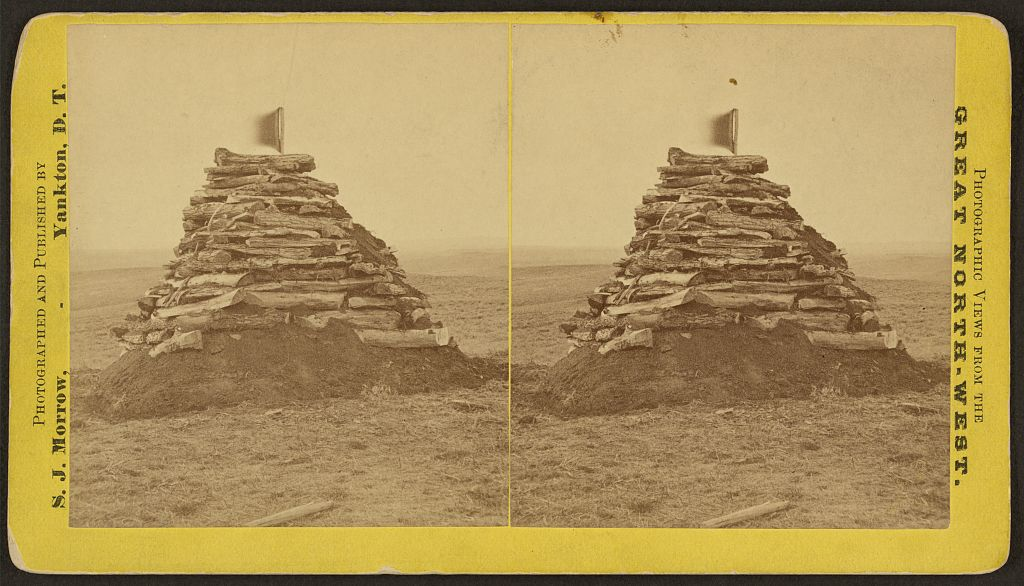
The monument on Custer's hill, containing all the bones found on the field.

Instead of disturbing any remains, I carefully remounded all graves that could be found. At each grave a stake was driven, where those that had previously placed had fallen. Newspaper reports to the effect that bodies still lay exposed are sensational. From a careful searching of the entire ground the remains now buried beneath the mound were all that could be found. I believe the large number of horse bones lying over the field have given rise to some of such statements, and to prevent any such statements being made in the future, I had all the horse bones gathered together and placed in the mound where they can not be readily disturbed by curiosity seekers.

The ground to the north and east of the field was well searched for six miles in each direction, but no trace of any remains were found, nor anything to indicate that any persons were killed in that direction. The maintenance of the field is complete. Each grave has been reshaped with new soil, and all animal bones have been cleared from the site. This work was scheduled to be finished as early as possible.

Your Obedient (Signed)

G.K. Sanderson

Capt. 11 U.S. Infantry.

Stanley J. Morrow took advantage of Captain Sanderson’s work and took a series of historic photographs which clearly show the horse bones gathered on Custer Hill in several large piles just prior to their first interment within the cordwood monument.

"Gracie's Butte," a handsome conical formation, capped with rock, stands out prominently in the valley of Tullock's Fork, a branch of the Big Horn, to the east of the divide, and about half a mile west of the boundary. It was named after Miss Gracie Sanderson, daughter of Captain Sanderson, Eleventh Infantry, and from its shape and position forms a prominent landmark in this section.

GK Sanderson, Eleventh Infantry, post-commander, Fort Custer August 1879-October 1880.

In 1883, he was assigned to recruit duty Davids Island, New York Harbor. Leave of absence for one month has been granted Capt. George K. Sanderson, Eleventh Infantry recruiting officer, April 11, 1883. May 7, 1884. The leave of absence on Surgeon's certificate of disability, granted Capt. George K. Sanderson, Eleventh Infantry, has been extended six months on Surgeon's certificate of disability.

=== Division of the Atlantic ===
July 29, 1887, Company C, Eleventh Infantry, left Fort Yates to proceed to and take station at Fort Ontario, New York. 1887-91 Capt George K Sanderson, Commanding Fort Ontario and Company C (with HQ from Madison Barracks).

1st Lieutenant Henry 0. S. Heistand, to be captain of infantry. March 19, 1891, vice Sanderson, promoted and assigned to the 18th Infantry.

== 18th Infantry ==
Eighteenth Regiment of Infantry

Captain George K. Sanderson, 11th Infantry, to be major of infantry, March 19, 1891. He was stationed at Fort Clark, Texas, near Brackettville, Texas.

Major George K. Sanderson, 18th Infantry, retired April 2, 1892, and died 2 Feb 1893, Lampasas, Texas.
