= Frances Adelaide Leverich Ingraham =

American socialite

Directoress General, Daughters of Holland Dames
- In office 1910–1912

President General, Daughters of the Revolution of 1776

Personal details
- Born: Frances Adelaide Leverich Brooklyn, New York, U.S.
- Died: September 7, 1934 New Canaan, Connecticut, U.S.
- Spouse: D. Phoenix Ingraham
- Children: 2
- Occupation: clubwoman

Frances Adelaide Leverich Ingraham (died September 7, 1934), also known as Mrs. D. Phoenix Ingraham, was an American socialite and clubwoman. She served as Directoress General of the Society of Daughters of Holland Dames and as President General of the General Society Daughters of the Revolution 1776.

== Early life and family ==
Ingraham was born Frances Adelaide Leverich in Brooklyn, New York to Richard Berrien Leverich and Margaret Maria Schoonmaker. They lived in Brooklyn Heights.

She was the great-great granddaughter of Theodore Polhemus, a member of the First Provincial Congress in 1775. Ingraham was also the great-great granddaughter of Peter Vandervoort, ensign of Kings Country Troop of Horse in 1776, and the great-great granddaughter of Rev. Martinus Schoonmaker, pastor of the Dutch Reformed churches of Harlem and Gravesend.

== Clubs ==
Ingraham was a prominent woman in New York and was involved in many lineage and patriotic societies. She served as Secretary General of the General Society Daughters of the Revolution 1776 in 1893, of which she was a founding member. She later served as President General for the society. She was president of the New York State Chapter of the Daughters of Founders and Patriots of America, honorary vice president of the United States Daughters of 1812, Directress General of the Society of Daughters of Holland Dames from 1910 to 1912, and a member of the Descendants of the Ancient and Honorable Families of New Netherland, the Huguenot Society of America, the Order of the Constitution.

== Personal life and death ==
In 1875, she married the businessman D. Phoenix Ingraham. They had two children, Marguerite Leverich Ingraham and Sidney Phoenix Ingraham.

Ingraham died in New Canaan, Connecticut.
