= Colonial Dame =

Colonial Dame could refer to:

- Colonial Dames of America, based in New York
- The National Society of the Colonial Dames of America, based in Washington, D.C.
- National Society Colonial Dames XVII Century, based in Washington, D.C.

== See also ==
- Daughters of the American Revolution
- National Society Daughters of the American Colonists
- Southern Dames of America
- Society of Daughters of Holland Dames
