= Flora Adams Darling =

American author and clubwoman

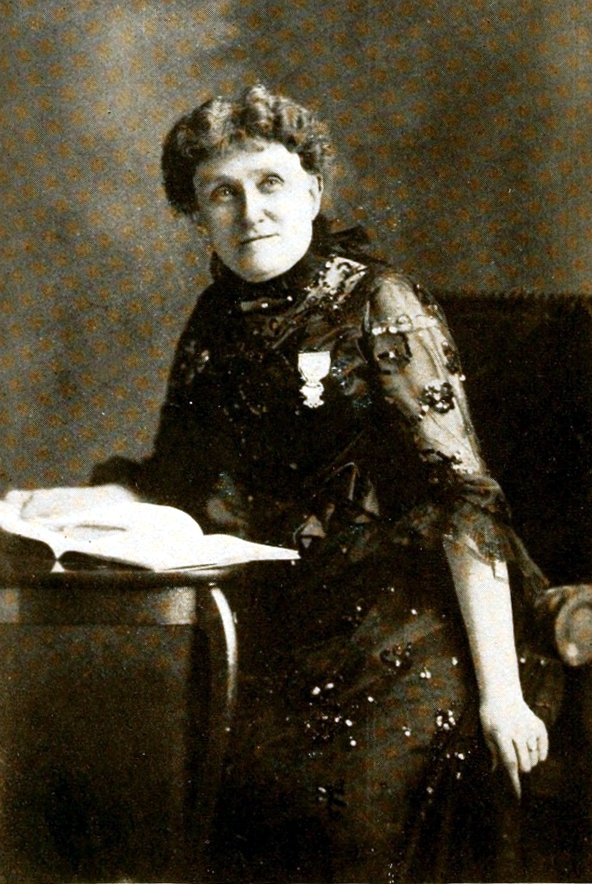
- Darling in 1907

1st President National, United States Daughters of 1812
- In office 1892–1896

Vice President General, Daughters of the American Revolution
- In office 1890–1891

Personal details
- Born: Sophronia A. Adams; July 25, 1840 Lancaster, New Hampshire, U.S.
- Died: January 6, 1910 (aged 69) New York, New York, U.S.
- Resting place: Congressional Cemetery
- Spouse: Edward Irving Darling
- Children: 1
- Parents: Harvey Adams (father); Nancy Dustin Rowell (mother)
- Relatives: Adams family
- Education: Lancaster Academy
- Occupation: author clubwoman

Flora Adams Darling (née Sophronia A. Adams; July 25, 1840 – January 6, 1910) was an American author and clubwoman. She is primarily noted for playing a role in founding the Daughters of the American Revolution in 1890 and for founding the Daughters of the Revolution of 1776 in 1891 and the United States Daughters of 1812 in 1892.

== Early years and education ==
She was born Sophronia A. Adams in Lancaster, New Hampshire, the fifth of eleven children of Harvey Adams, a Christian deacon and member of the Adams political family, and his second wife Nancy Dustin Adams (née Rowell). She was one of eleven children. Darling was still listed as "Fronia Adams" on the 1860 census, and was living in Lancaster with her family at age nineteen. At some point after this, she changed her name to Flora. She received a formal education at Lancaster Academy.

== Career ==
Despite growing increasingly deaf following the Civil War, Darling became a prolific writer who published in magazines and journals, and wrote a number of novels and short stories. In 1886, based on the merits of her writing, she was granted an honorary A.M. from Western Maryland College. She was also awarded an honorary degree from the Kentucky Military Institute.

She lived in Washington, D. C. for forty years, where she was socially active and developed an interest in founding patriotic societies. Darling played a role in founding the Daughters of the American Revolution (DAR) on October 11, 1890, although the society does not recognize her as one of its founders. She served as Vice President General of the DAR and traveled around the United States to recruit new members. Tensions arose between Darling and other DAR officers due to her unpredictability and reportedly erratic bookkeeping, which caused chaos within the organization. After the DAR's board refused to pay when Darling ordered 10,000 application blanks, she ignored their decision to raise membership fees and continued to charge applicants the old rates and published her viewpoints in her self-published DAR magazine Adams Magazine. When the DAR's constitution was revised on May 26 1891, she refused to acknowledge the DAR board's authority and forbid the organization from using her name. The DAR then removed from her office as vice president general. She resigned from the DAR, asked that the organization delete her name from its records, and went on to establish the General Society of Daughters of the Revolution in 1891. She turned Adams Magazine into the official publication for the new lineage society.

In 1892, she founded the National Society of United States Daughters of 1812, a lineage-based service organization for women who descend from American patriots of the War of 1812. Each society was founded in turn because of disagreements she held with members of the previous organization.

Darling served as the vice president of the Lamperti School of Music and founded the Edward Irving Darling Musical Society in honor of her son, a composer who died in 1894. She worked to have the government sponsor a cultural academic institution, sold life insurance, and provided formal education to Native American girls in the Eastern United States. In 1907, she published the book 1607–1907: Memories of Virginia and Senator’s Daughter.

== Personal life and death ==
In her later life, she claimed to have been married in New York City on March 12, 1860, to Edward Irving Darling, a man 22 years her senior. More likely, the marriage, if it did take place, occurred later. Though she described her husband variously as a Confederate colonel and from Louisiana and Kentucky, neither has any record of him among its officers, nor does the index of Confederate soldiers in the National Archives. The couple had an only son, Edward Irving Darling, Jr., born October 9, 1862. She maintained that her husband died December 2, 1863, from wounds received on November 29 at the first Battle of Franklin, Tennessee; where she claimed he served as a brigadier-general in the Confederate States Army. Darling then attempted to travel north to her home and son under a flag of truce, but was taken by the Union Army in New Orleans as a prisoner of war. Later, following an appeal lasting 30 years, she won a case against the Federal government for false imprisonment and theft of her possessions, and was awarded $5,683.

She converted to Roman Catholicism from Protestantism.

In 1910, while visiting her brother in New York City, she died of apoplexy. She was buried at Congressional Cemetery in Washington, D.C. Members of the National Society United States Daughters of 1812 between the age of 18 to 35 are termed "Flora Adams Darling Daughters" in her memory.

== Works ==
- 1607–1907. Memories of Virginia; a souvenir of founding days (1907)
- Founding and organization of the Daughters of the American Revolution and Daughters of the Revolution (1901)
- The Senator's Daughter (1892)
- From Two Points of View (1892)
- A Social Diplomat (1891)
- Was it a Just Verdict? (1890)
- The Bourbon Lily (1890)
- A winning, wayward woman: Chapters in the heart-history of Amélie Warden (1889)
- Mrs. Darling's Letters, or Memoirs of the Civil War, A Social Diplomat (1884)
