= Horatio Collins King =

American politician

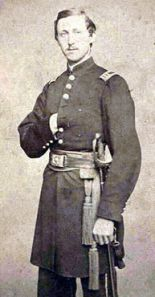
- Born: December 22, 1837; Portland, Maine
- Died: November 15, 1918 (aged 80); Brooklyn, New York
- Burial place: Green-Wood Cemetery
- Spouse(s): Emma Carter Stebbins; Esther Augusta Howard
- Military career
- Allegiance: United States of America; Union
- Branch: United States Army; Union Army; New York National Guard
- Service years: 1862 – 1865 (Army), 1876 – 1883 (National Guard)
- Rank: Brevet Colonel (Army); Brigadier General (National Guard)
- Conflicts: American Civil War
- Awards: Medal of Honor
- Other work: Judge-Advocate-General, New York; Author

Horatio Collins King (December 22, 1837 – November 15, 1918) was a Union Army soldier who received the Medal of Honor for his actions during the American Civil War. He also served as a U.S. lawyer, politician and author.

== Biography ==
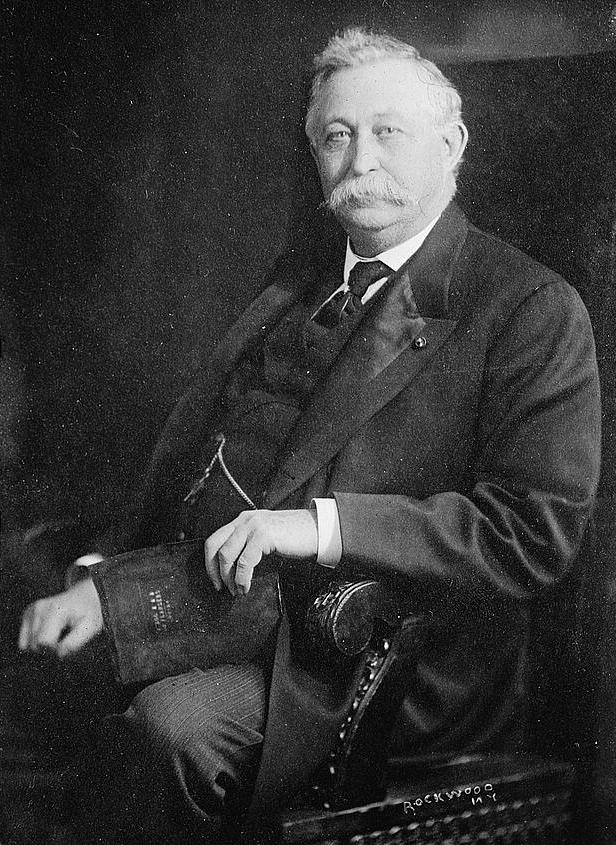
Horatio Collins King

Born in Portland, Maine, King graduated from Dickinson College in 1858, studied law, and was admitted to the bar in New York City in 1861. He served in the armies of the Potomac and Shenandoah during the Civil War from August 1862 until May 1865, when he resigned with the rank of brevet colonel. King earned the Medal of Honor for service near Dinwiddie Courthouse, Virginia, on March 31, 1865.

King then practiced law until 1870, when he became connected with the press. He was the author of The Plymouth Silver Wedding (New York, 1873); The Brooklyn Congregational Council (1876); King's Guide to Regimental Courts-Martial (1882); and edited Proceedings of the Army of the Potomac (1879–'87).

In 1883, King was appointed judge-advocate-general of New York.

At a time during which anti-Chinese views were common, King was socially friendly with the Chinese minister in Washington, D.C., and the Chinese consul in New York. In 1893, when the anti-Chinese Geary Act was ruled constitutional, he protested the law, saying that "from the prejudice manifested against the Chinese, it seems they have no rights here that Americans are bound to respect."

In 1895, he ran on the Democratic ticket for Secretary of State of New York, but was defeated by Republican John Palmer.

In 1912, he ran on the Progressive ticket for New York State Comptroller, but was defeated by Democrat William Sohmer.

King was a member of the Military Order of the Loyal Legion of the United States and the Sons of the American Revolution. King was the Secretary of the Society of the Army of the Potomac.

His father, Horatio King, was Postmaster General of the United States.

== Medal of Honor citation ==
Rank and organization: Major and Quartermaster, U.S. Volunteers. Place and date: Near Dinwiddie Courthouse, Va., March 31, 1865. Entered service at: Brooklyn, N.Y. Born: December 22, 1837, Portland, Maine. Date of issue: September 23, 1897.

Citation:

While serving as a volunteer aide, carried orders to the reserve brigade and participated with it in the charge which repulsed the enemy.

== See also ==
- List of Medal of Honor recipients
- List of American Civil War Medal of Honor recipients: G–L

== Notes ==
Party political offices
First	Progressive nominee for New York State Comptroller; 1912	Succeeded by John B. Burnham
