= John P. Sanderson =

American politician

John Phillip Sanderson
- Born: February 13, 1818; East Hanover, Pennsylvania, US
- Died: October 14, 1864 (aged 46); St. Louis, Missouri
- Burial place: Ferncliff Cemetery, Springfield, Ohio
- Relatives: George K. Sanderson
- Military career
- Allegiance: United States; Union
- Branch: US Army; Union Army
- Service years: 1861-1864
- Rank: Colonel
- Unit: 15th U.S. Infantry
- Commands: 13th U.S. Infantry
- Conflicts: American Civil War: Battle of Chickamauga

For the political leader in Florida see John Pease Sanderson John Phillip Sanderson (February 13, 1818 – October 14, 1864) was a soldier, influential politician, lawyer, author, newspaper editor, and member of the Pennsylvania General Assembly. He is probably most well known for his exposé of the secret political organization known as the Knights of the Golden Circle, which led to its demise.

== Lawyer ==
Sanderson was admitted to the bar in 1839. He practiced law in Philadelphia from about 1848–1861.

== Author and editor ==
Sanderson was the author of Views and Opinions of American Statesmen on Foreign Immigration (Philadelphia, 1843), and Republican Landmarks (1850). He edited & published the weekly Demokratischer Whig starting in 1843, and the Anti-Masonic weekly, Der Libanon Demokrat from 1844 to 1848. He was then the editor of the Philadelphia Daily News from 1848 to 1856.

== Politician ==
Sanderson was elected to the Pennsylvania State House of Representatives in 1845 and to the Pennsylvania State Senate in 1847. He was the state chairman of the Know-Nothing Party, when it renamed itself the American Party in 1855.

=== United States presidential election of 1856 ===
Hopes that the Pennsylvania fusion ticket would prevent Buchanan's victory, were dashed when John P. Sanderson, the Know-Nothing Party's state chairman, announced that the original slate of the American Party electors would remain in the field, thereby diluting the strength of the "Union" fusionist ticket. Former president Millard Fillmore's "Know-Nothing" candidacy helping James Buchanan to defeat John C. Frémont, the first Republican candidate in the 1856 United States presidential election.

=== United States presidential election of 1860 ===
Sanderson was one of the Pennsylvania delegates to the 1860 Republican National Convention at Chicago. He was one of Simon Cameron's confidential advisers. Sanderson, in conference with Judge David Davis, who most prominently represented the Lincoln interest, came to a practical agreement on the night before the balloting that Pennsylvania's vote after a complimentary ballot for Cameron be cast for Lincoln, and that Lincoln should give Cameron a cabinet position. The casting of Pennsylvania's vote for Abraham Lincoln on the second ballot was one of the facts that contributed most toward Lincoln's nomination for the 1860 United States presidential election.

== Soldier ==
When Cameron was named Secretary of War in President Abraham Lincoln's cabinet, Sanderson was appointed chief clerk of the War Department on March 4, 1861. He resigned from that position to become lieutenant colonel of his son George K. Sanderson's regiment the 15th U.S. Infantry on May 14, 1861. He reported to Newport Barracks and assumed command of the regiment's headquarters.

Sanderson was appointed colonel of the 13th U.S. Infantry on July 4, 1863, and soon after accepted a position as an aide to Major General William Rosecrans on the staff of the Army of the Cumberland, where he served during the Battle of Chickamauga. After Rosecrans was relieved of his command Sanderson went with him.

When Rosecrans took command of the Department of the Missouri late in January 1864, he brought Sanderson with him as Provost Marshal General of the Department of the Missouri. An assistant to Secretary of War Edwin M. Stanton, Charles A. Dana, accused Colonel Sanderson of cowardice at the Battle of Chickamauga. This initially held up Congressional approval of his appointment, but Rosecrans soundly refuted this, saying that he "believe[d] the charges to be maliciously false and without the shadow of foundation." l

Colonel Sanderson served in this position until his death after a month's illness at St. Louis, Missouri on October 14, 1864.

Sanderon's most important public service was the full exposition that he made during the civil war of the secret political organization in the northern and western states, known as the "Knights of the Golden Circle" or the "Order of American knights." His exposure of this organization led to the breaking up of that order.
