= Esther Augusta Howard King =

American clubwoman

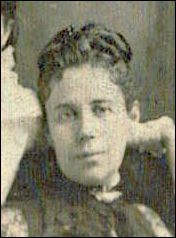
- Born: Esther Augusta Howard; September 20, 1845; New York, U.S.
- Died: March 29, 1925 (aged 79); New York, New York, U.S.
- Resting place: Green-Wood Cemetery
- Occupation: Clubwoman
- Spouse: Horatio Collins King
- Children: 9

Esther Augusta Howard King (September 20, 1845 – March 29, 1925) was an American clubwoman. She served on the executive committee of the General Society Daughters of the Revolution 1776 and served as regent of the Fort Greene Chapter of the Daughters of the American Revolution. She was the second wife of Union Army officer Horatio Collins King.

== Early life ==
King was born Esther Augusta Howard on September 20, 1845 in New York. She was the daughter of Captain John Tasker Howard, who was an officer in the Union Army during the American Civil War.

== Civic activities ==
King and her husband were involved in the Prison Ship Martyr's Monument Association of the United States. She was also a member of the Daughters of the American Revolution, where she served as regent of the Fort Greene Chapter for four years. King was also a member of the General Society Daughters of the Revolution 1776 and served on the national executive committee.

== Personal life ==
In June 1866, she married Horatio Collins King, who served in the army with her father. She was his second wife. They lived in Brooklyn Heights, New York and had nine children.
