= The Huguenot Society of America =

Hereditary patriotic society

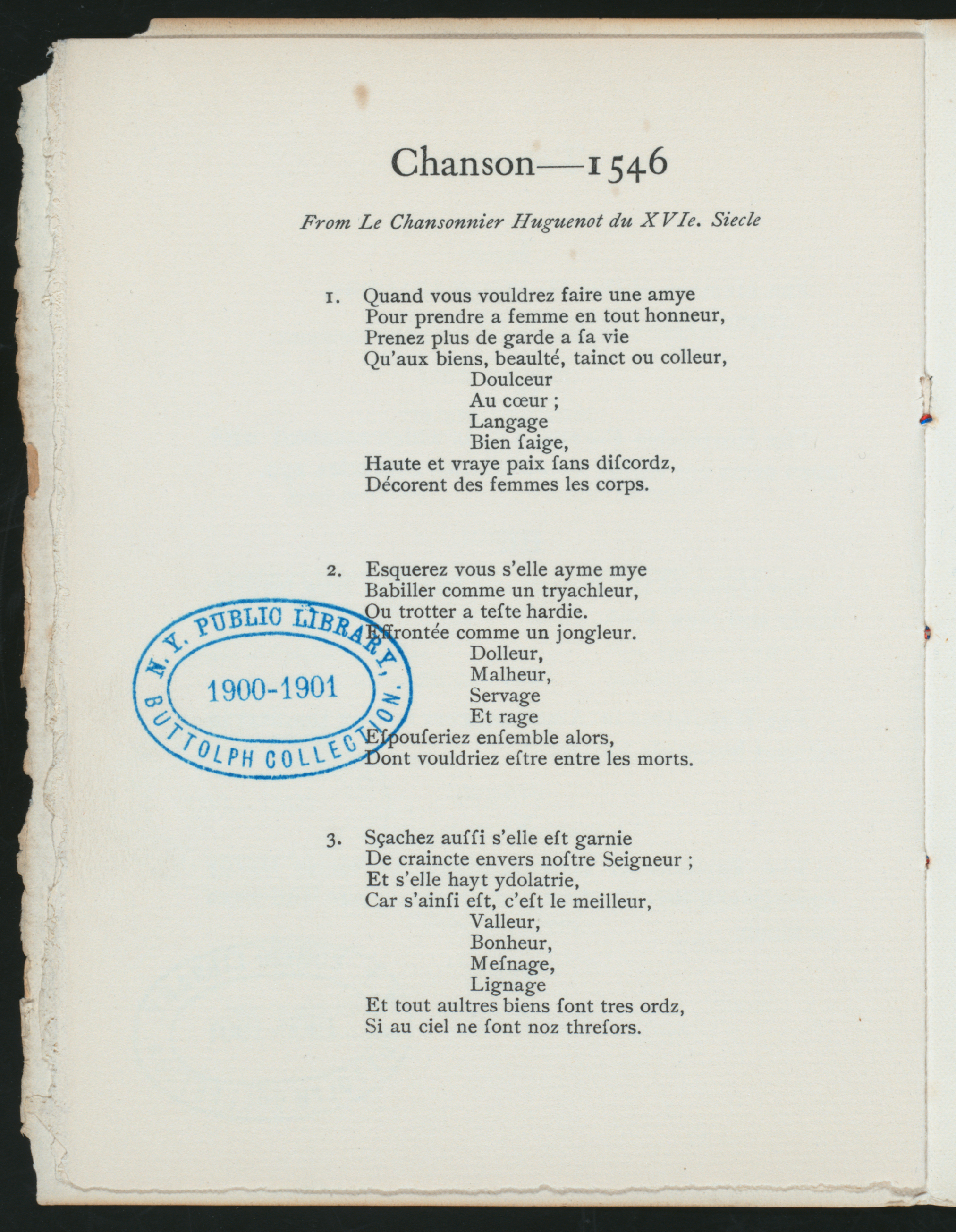
A page of "Dinner, Huguenot Society of America, Delmonico's, New York, NY"

The Huguenot Society of America is a hereditary patriotic society, organized in New York City on April 12, 1883, and incorporated on June 12, 1885. The Society was founded by Alfred Wittmeyer, pastor of the French protestant congregation in New York.

== About ==
Emblem of The Huguenot Society of America

The Huguenot Society of America is a New York City–based genealogical organization. On April 12, 1883, the Society was inaugurated by a group of descendants of Huguenots who had fled persecution in France and who (or whose descendants) settled in what is now the United States of America. The purpose of the Society is primarily to promote the cause of religious freedom and to perpetuate the memory of the Huguenot settlers. Its first president was John Jay—lawyer, diplomat, abolitionist, and grandson of the first Chief Justice of the United States.

Today, the Huguenot Society of America has members in forty-three of the fifty States, the District of Columbia, Great Britain, Italy, and the Netherlands. The Society maintains an extensive library of books relating to Huguenot history; preserves pictures, sculptures, and artifacts relating to the Huguenots; presents lectures on topics of Huguenot interest; supports important research in Huguenot history; and gives annual scholarships to American Huguenot descendants attending selected colleges and universities.

The Huguenot Society of America is sometimes confused with the similarly named but unaffiliated National Huguenot Society, which was founded in 1956.

== Notable members ==
- Alphonso T. Clearwater
- Maud Callaway Hays
- Frances Adelaide Leverich Ingraham
- John Jay (lawyer)
- Sarah McKelley King
- Martha J. Lamb
- Henry Gurdon Marquand
- Frederic James de Peyster
- Jacqueline Noel
- Katherine Bissell Roe
