= Colleen Cutschall =

Canadian artist

Colleen Cutschall (born 1951), also known as Sister Wolf, is an Oglala-Sicangu Lakota artist from Pine Ridge, South Dakota, who works in Manitoba.

== Early life ==
Cutschall was born in Pine Ridge, South Dakota. Cutschall studied with painter Oscar Howe in the late 1960s. She holds a Bachelor of Fine Arts from Barat College and a Master of Education from Black Hills State University.

== Career ==
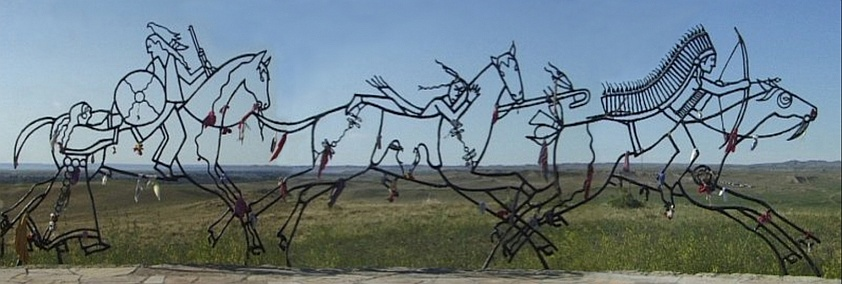
Cutschall's art at Little Bighorn Battlefield National Monument

Cutschall is a Lakota artist, art historian, educator, writer, activist, and curator from who has lived and worked in Southwestern Manitoba since the 1980s. She works in painting, sculpture, photography, and installation art. Some themes of her work include Lakota mythological archetypes, human relationships to the cosmos, and the implications of exploration. Her work is described as being flexible and situational and incorporating elements of anthropology, feminism, natural sciences, and cultural identity.

Cutschall's work is in the permanent collection of the Manitoba Arts Council Art Bank, the Canada Council Art Bank, the Government of Manitoba, Thunder Bay Art Gallery, Kenderdine Art Gallery, MacKenzie Art Gallery, Oscar Howe Art Center, and the Winnipeg Art Gallery.

Cutschall is known for designing the sculpture Spirit Warriors, installed at Little Bighorn Battlefield National Monument. This iron sculpture at the Little Bighorn Battlefield National Monument, which was until 1991 named after George Custer, United States Commander in the American Indian Wars. Cutschall's sculpture commemorates Native American warriors in the Great Sioux War of 1876.

In addition to maintaining her studio practice, Cutschall is professor emerita at Brandon University. After over twenty years of teaching at Brandon University in the Department of Native Studies, she founded the Department of Visual and Aboriginal Art.

== Selected exhibitions ==
- "Voices in the Blood," Art Gallery of Southwestern Manitoba, 1990. Toured to the Oscar Howe Art Center, Dakota Gallery; Minnesota State University, South Dakota; the Art Gallery of Mississauga; the Thunder Bay Art Gallery; the MacKenzie Art Gallery; and more.
- "Sister Wolf in Her Moon," Thunder Bay Art Gallery, 1995.
- "House Made of Stars," Winnipeg Art Gallery, 1996.
- "Identity By Design: Tradition, Change and Celebration in Native Women's Dresses," March 24, 2007 - August 3, 2008, National Museum of the American Indian, Washington, D.C.; and September 26, 2008 - February 7, 2010, National Museum of the American Indian, New York, NY, at the George Gustav Heye Center. Cutschall also wrote a chapter, Dress, Designers, and the Dance of Life, for a book which accompanied the exhibition.
- "….Dies Again!," Urban Shaman, May 27, 2005 - July 2, 2005, Winnipeg, Manitoba.
