= Little Bighorn Battlefield National Monument =

Historical battlefield in Montana, United States

- IUCN category III (natural monument or feature)
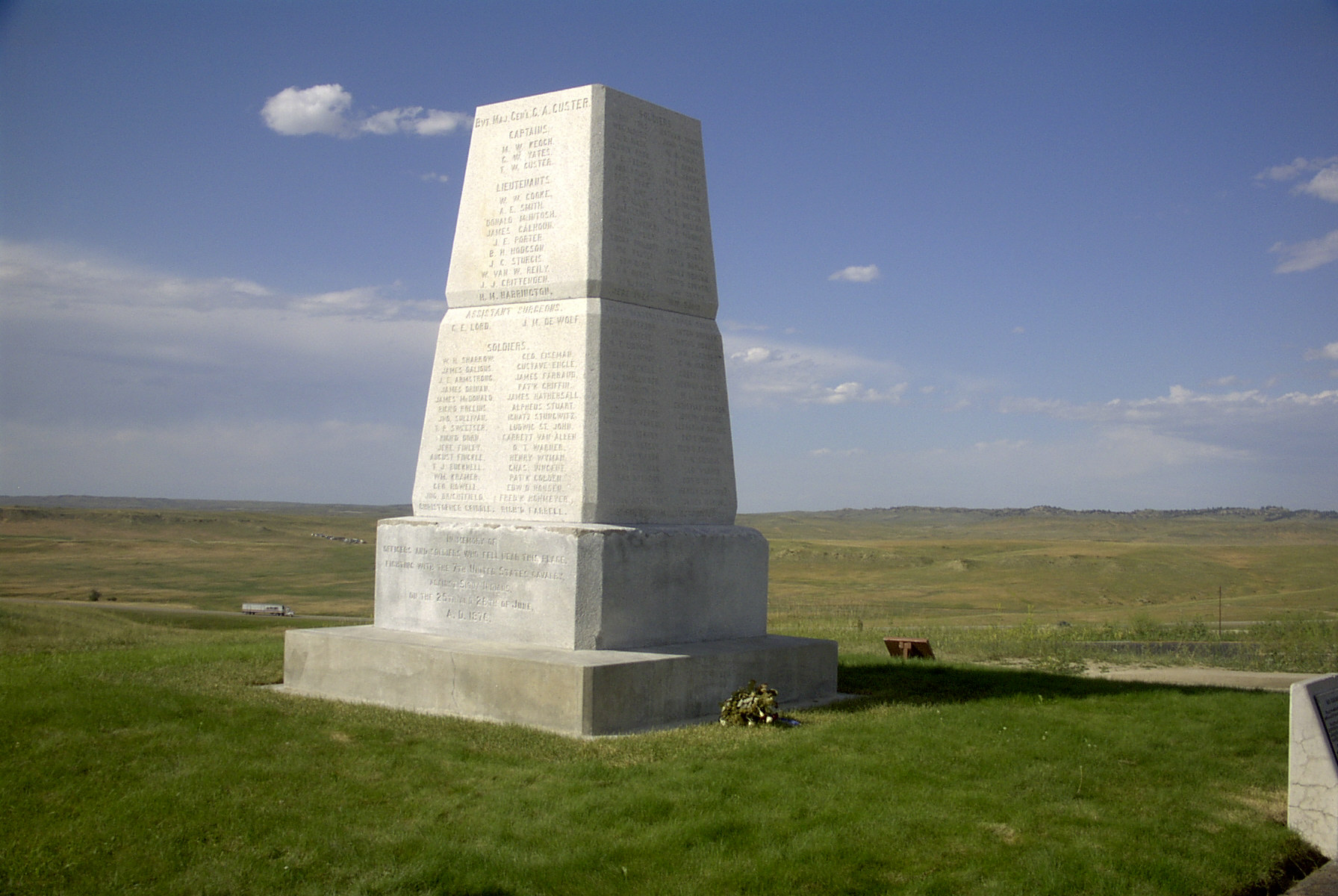
- Memorial obelisk

- Location within Montana Location within the United States
- Interactive map of Little Bighorn Battlefield National Monument
- Location: Big Horn County, Montana, US
- Nearest city: Crow Agency, Montana
- Coordinates: 45°34′13″N 107°25′39″W
- Area: 765.34 acres (309.72 ha)
- Established: January 29, 1879
- Visitors: 42,405 (in 2025)
- Governing body: National Park Service
- Website: Little Bighorn Battlefield National Monument

Little Bighorn Battlefield National Monument preserves the site of the June 25 and 26, 1876, Battle of the Little Bighorn, near Crow Agency, Montana, in the United States. It also serves as a memorial to those who fought in the battle: George Armstrong Custer's 7th Cavalry and a combined Lakota-Northern Cheyenne and Arapaho force. Custer National Cemetery, on the battlefield, is part of the national monument. The site of the connected military action led by Marcus Reno and Frederick Benteen is also part of the National Monument, but is about 3 miles (4.83 km) southeast of the main site.

As part of a series of censorship actions at several National Park Service sites, in February 2026 the Trump Administration removed interpretive signage that described the background of the Battle of Little Bighorn and Native American boarding schools. Changes were opposed by the Northern Cheyenne Tribal Council.

== History of site ==
The geography of the site is complex, consisting of dissected uplands, rugged bluffs, the Little Bighorn River, and adjacent plains. Vegetation varies widely from one area to the next.

- June 25 and 26, 1876: Battle of the Little Bighorn
- 1877: Custer, who had been buried there, was reinterred in West Point Cemetery.
- January 29, 1879: The Secretary of War first preserved the site as a U.S. National Cemetery, to protect graves of the 7th Cavalry troopers buried there.
- December 7, 1886: The site was proclaimed National Cemetery of Custer's Battlefield Reservation to include burials of other campaigns and wars. The name has been shortened to "Custer National Cemetery".
- November 5, 1887: Battle of Crow Agency, three miles north of Custer battlefield
- April 14, 1926: Reno-Benteen Battlefield was added.
- July 1, 1940: The site was transferred from the United States Department of War to the National Park Service
- March 22, 1946: The site was redesignated "Custer Battlefield National Monument".
- October 15, 1966: The site was listed on the National Register of Historic Places.
- 1976, The American Indian Movement (AIM) protested the centennial commemoration of the site, arguing that the site revered Custer and the Battle of Little Big Horn as a part of a heroic saga of American history and expansion into the American West while those who revered it had been truly "celebrating an act of genocide".
- August 11, 1983: A wildfire destroyed dense thorn scrub which over the years had seeded itself about and covered the site. This allowed archaeologists access to the site.
- 1984, 1985: Archaeological digging on site.
- December 10, 1991: The site was renamed Little Bighorn Battlefield National Monument by a law signed by President George H. W. Bush.

== Memorials ==
The first memorial on the site was assembled by Captain George K. Sanderson and the 11th Infantry. They buried soldiers' bodies where they were found and removed animal bones. In his official report dated April 7, 1879, Sanderson wrote:

I accordingly built a mound out of cord wood filled in the center with all the horse bones I could find on the field. In the center of the mound I dug a grave and interred all the human bones that could be found, in all, parts of four or five different bodies. This grave was then built up with wood for four feet above ground. The mound is ten feet square and about eleven feet high; is built on the highest point immediately in rear of where Gen'l Custer's body was found ...

Lieutenant Charles Francis Roe and the 2nd Cavalry built the granite memorial in July 1881 that stands today on the top of Last Stand Hill. They also reinterred soldiers' remains near the new memorial, but left stakes in the ground to mark where they had fallen. In 1890 these stakes were replaced with marble markers.

The bill that changed the name of the national monument also called for an "Indian Memorial" to be built near Last Stand Hill.

Markers honoring the Indians who fought at Little Big Horn, including Crazy Horse, have been added to those of the U.S. troops. On Memorial Day, 1999, the first of five red granite markers denoting where warriors fell during the battle were placed on the battlefield for Cheyenne warriors Lame White Man and Noisy Walking.

The Indian Memorial (2001–2003) was designed by John R. Collins and Alison J. Towers, who won a national competition in 1997 set out by Congress. Constructed of sandstone, it takes the form of a circular low wall that is topped with sculptor Colleen Cutschall (Oglala and Sicangu)'s bronze figure procession Spirit Warriors. Then-Colorado Senator Ben Nighthorse Campbell spoke at the dedication of the monument: "[...] Come back sometime early in the morning after a rain when the fog is laying in the valleys and things are quiet and the moon is waning, and perhaps all you can hear is the sounds of nature. If you're here by yourself during that time, I know you'll feel like Indian people feel when they're here." Nighthorse Campbell is descended from one of the Cheyenne leaders who fought General Custer.

The warriors' red speckled granite memorial markers dot the ravines and hillsides, just as do the white marble markers representing where soldiers fell. Since then, markers have been added for the Sans Arc Lakota warrior Long Road and the Minniconjou Lakota Dog's Back Bone.

On June 25, 2003, an "unknown Lakota warrior marker" was placed on Wooden Leg Hill, east of Last Stand Hill to honor a warrior who was killed during the battle, as witnessed and reported by the Northern Cheyenne warrior Wooden Leg.

The battlefield is the final resting place of the western historian and author Stanley Vestal, a professor at the University of Oklahoma.

Custer National Cemetery

== Gallery ==
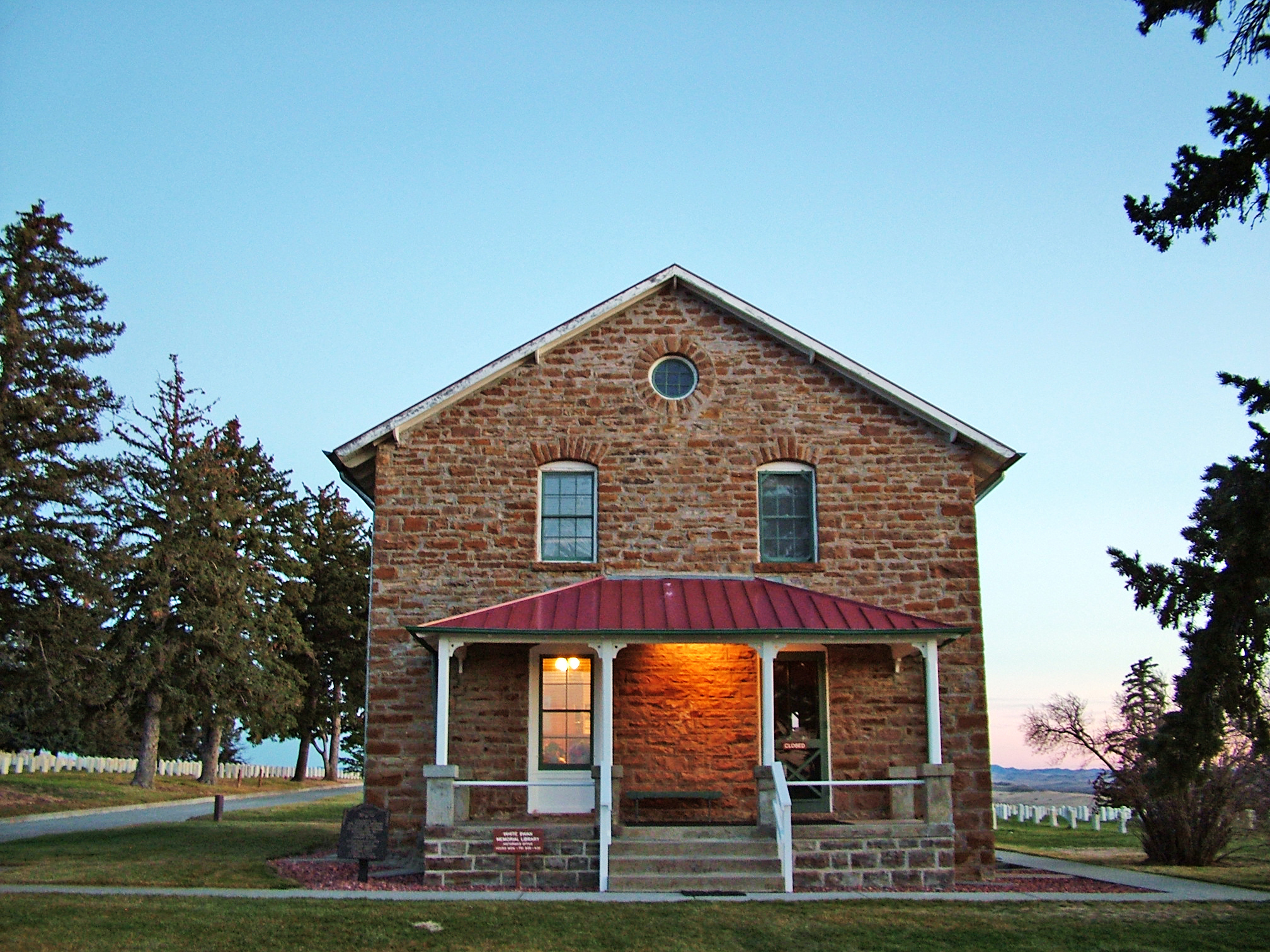
Superintendent's Lodge, built 1894

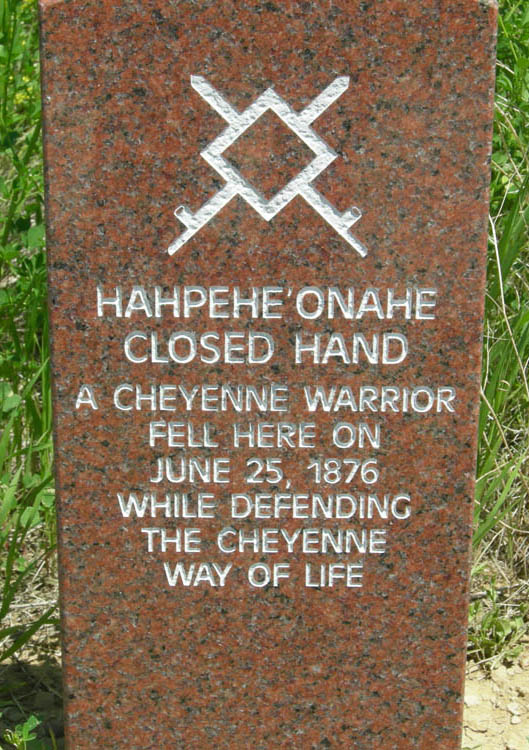
Cheyenne combatant marker stone on the battlefield

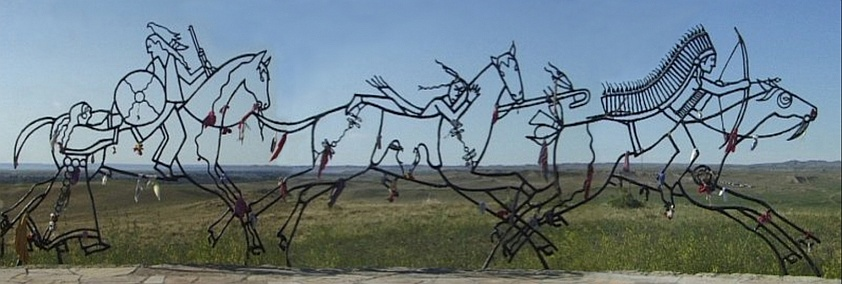
Indian Memorial

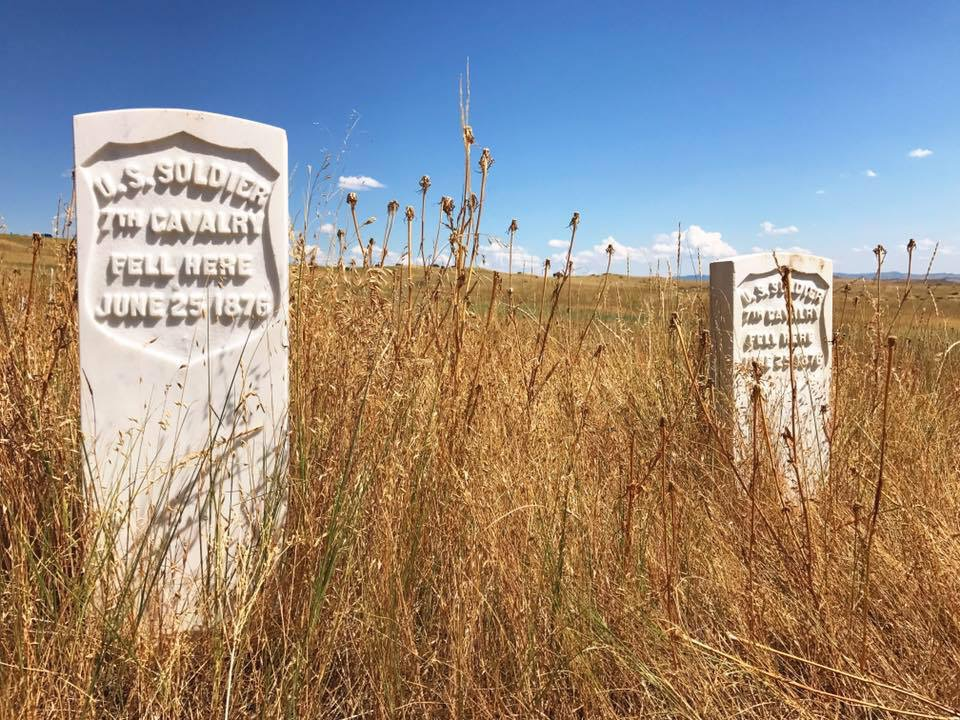
US Casualty Marker Battle of the Little Bighorn

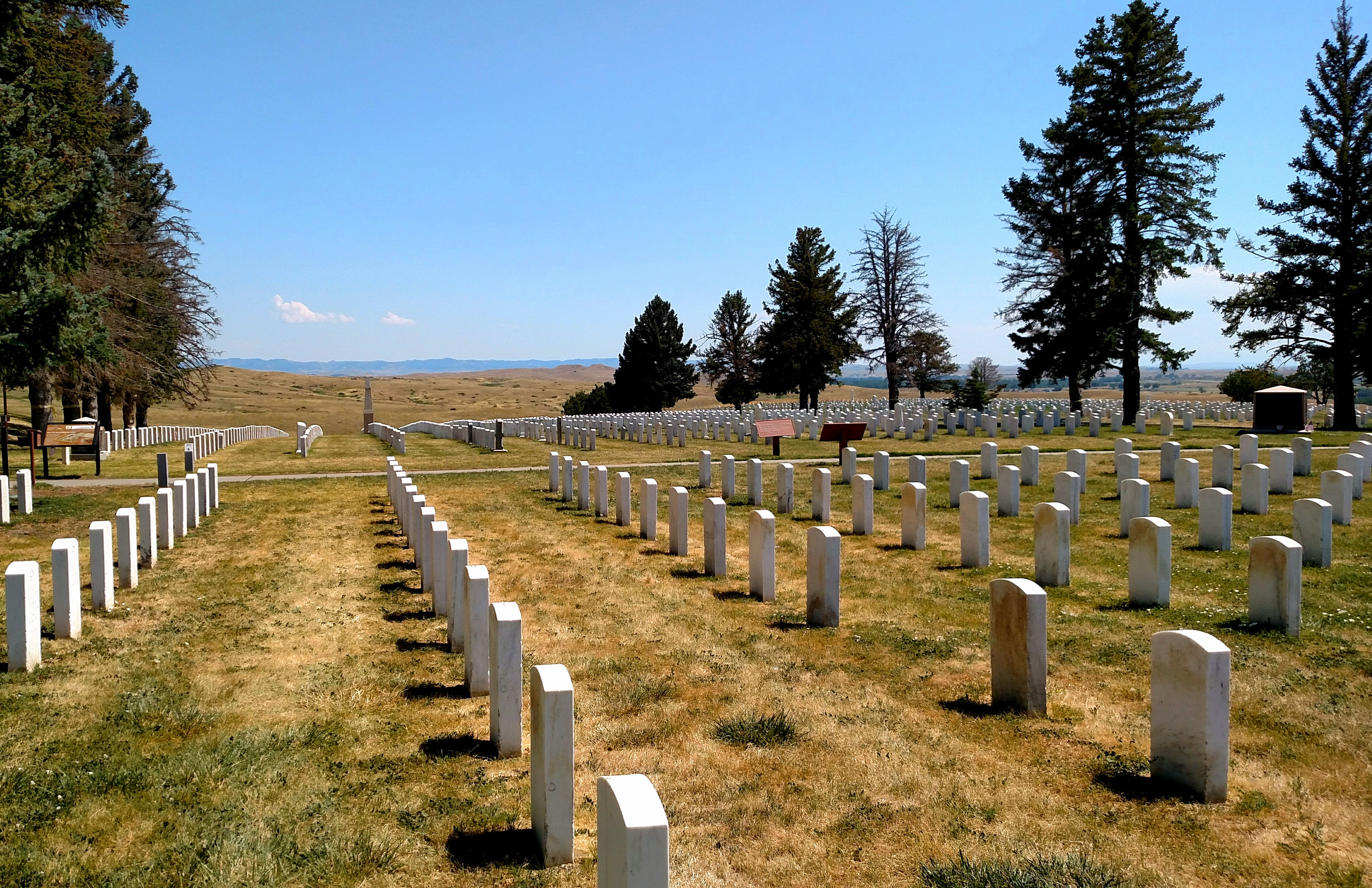
Custer National Cemetery, looking east

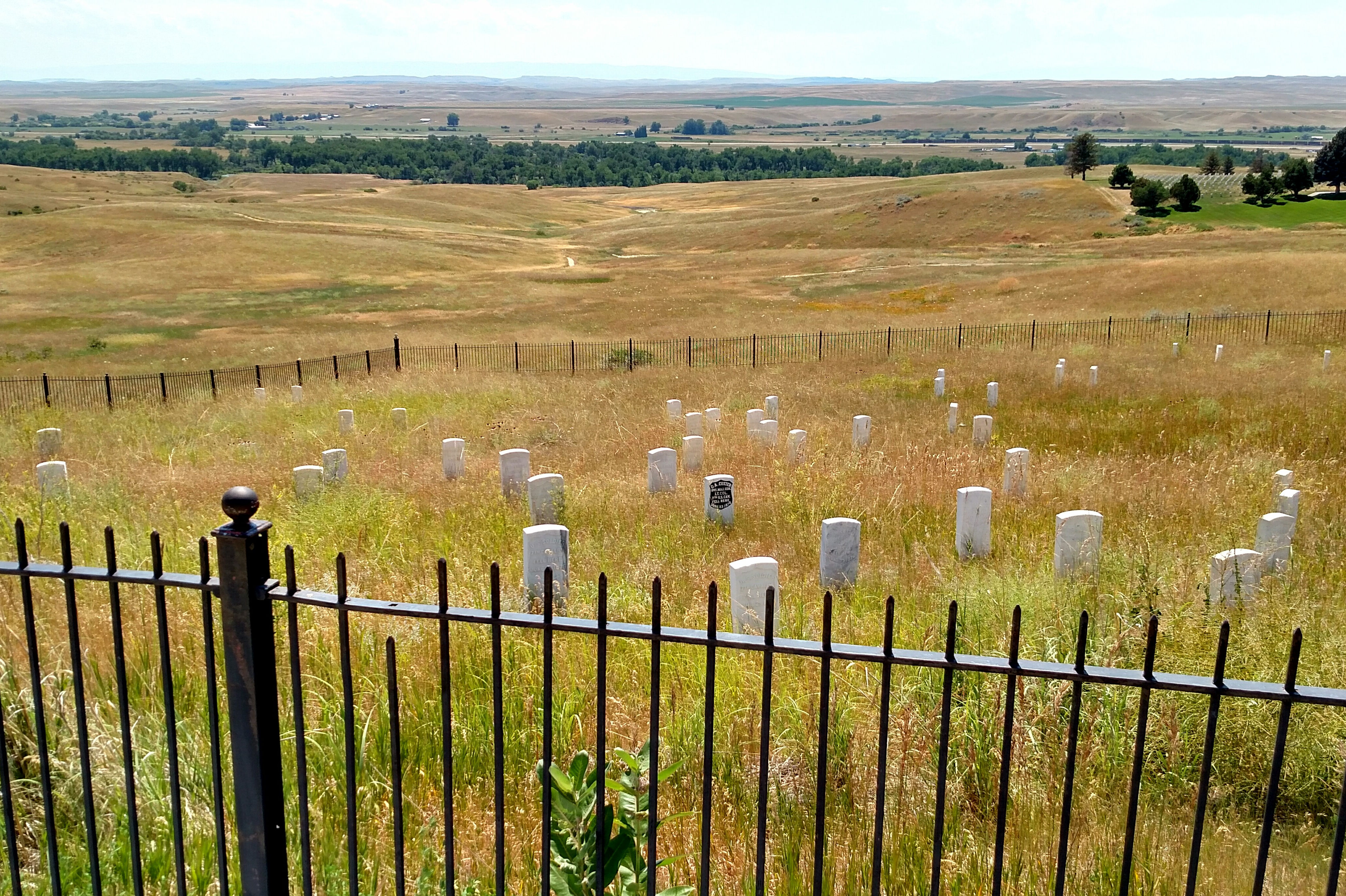
Black face marking the spot where Custer fell

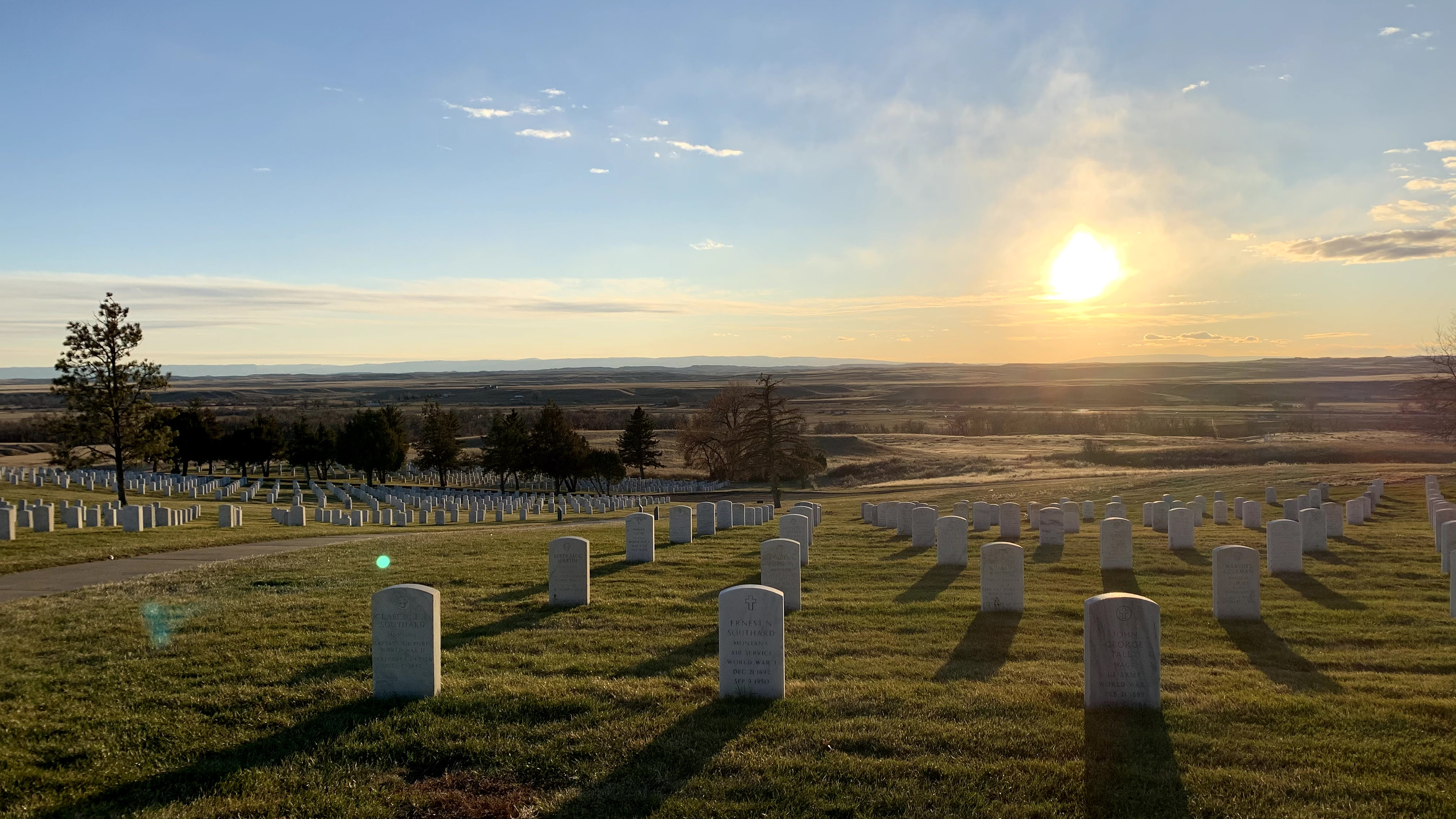
The battlefield at sunset

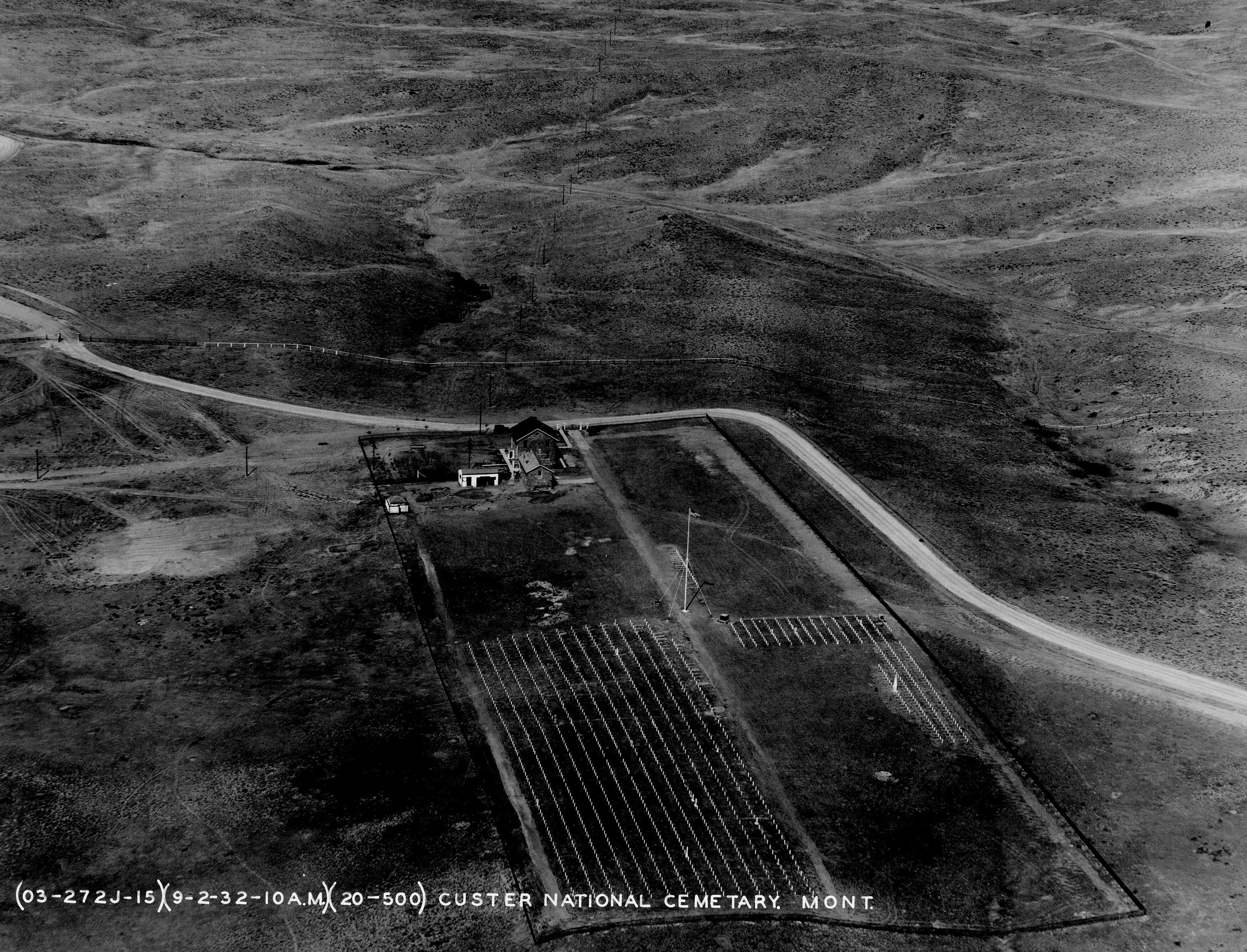
National cemetery in 1932

== See also ==
- List of military installations in Montana
- List of national monuments of the United States
