= General Society Daughters of the Revolution 1776 =

American lineage society

Daughters of the Revolution 1776
- General Society Daughters of the Revolution 1776
- Abbreviation: DOR1776
- Founded: August 20, 1891
- Founders: Flora Adams Darling
- Founded at: New York, New York, U.S.
- Type: Non-profit, lineage society, service organization
- National President: Ann Reynolds Bergeron
- Publication: Adams Magazine (former); Magazine of the Daughters of Revolution (former)
- Affiliations: Junior Sons and Daughters of the Revolution (former)

The General Society Daughters of the Revolution 1776 (DOR1776), formerly known as the National Society of the Daughters of the Revolution of 1776, is a lineage society for women who can prove lineal descent from a patriot of the American Revolution. The organization was founded in 1891 by Flora Adams Darling and disbanded in 1983. It was revived in 2026. The society's motto is "Liberty, Home, and Country".

== History ==
=== 1891 to 1983 ===
The Daughters of the Revolution of 1776 was founded by Flora Adams Darling and officially organized on August 20, 1891, incorporated under the laws of the State of New York. Darling founded the organization after being involved in conflict over governance within the Daughters of the American Revolution (DAR). She refused to acknowledge the authority of the DAR's executive board and was removed from her national office. Darling resigned from the DAR and turned Adams Magazine, which had previously been a DAR-issued publication, into the official paper for the Daughters of the Revolution of 1776. She used a seal on the cover of the publication that resembled the DAR's symbol. Adams Magazine was renamed Magazine of the Daughters of Revolution and was published quarterly out of 64 Madison Avenue in New York City until 1896. In 1892, Darling went on to establish the United States Daughters of 1812 and served as president-general of that organization. In 1901, Darling published The Founding and Organization of the Daughters of the American Revolution and Daughters of the Revolution.

Tiffany & Co. was contracted as the society's official jeweler, creating their seal, badges, and stationary.

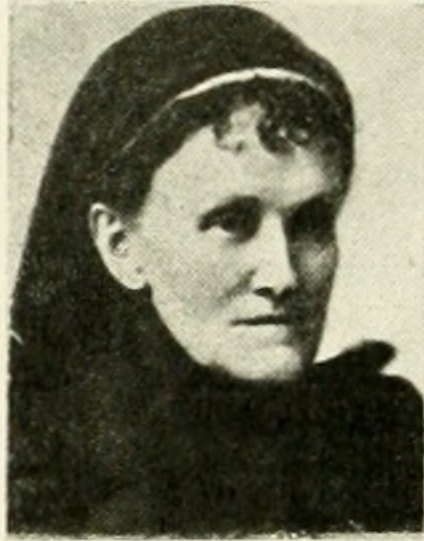
Daughters of the Revolution of 1776 founder Flora Adams Darling

The society was governed by a system of state societies and local chapters. At least twenty members residing in one state was required for the formation of a state society. Chapters were required to have at least five members living in the same town in order to form.

The society was created with the following objectives in mind:

To perpetuate the patriotic spirit of the men and women who achieved American Independence.
To commemorate prominent events connected with the War of the Revolution.
To collect, publish, ad preserve the rolls, records, and historic documents relating to the Revolutionary period.
To encourage the study of American history.
To promote sentiments of friendship and common interest among the members of the society.

The Junior Sons and Daughters of the Revolution was organized in 1897 as a children's auxiliary of the General Society Daughters of the Revolution of 1776. Membership was open to children of members of patriotic societies and to children of non-members who were eligible through Revolutionary ancestry. The children's auxiliary's objective was to promote American history, prepare children to be useful citizens, and inspire children with a love for the American flag.

By 1959 the General Society Daughters of the Revolution of 1776 had around 8,000 members.

The society disbanded in 1983. All of their records were donated to the Suffolk County Historical Society in Riverhead, New York.

=== 2026 revival ===
In 2026, the society was reorganized as the General Society Daughters of the Revolution 1776. The first executive officers for the revived organization were Ann Reynolds Bergeron as national president, Pennie Cockrel as national vice president, Savannah Hackler as national secretary and treasurer, and Brittney Kean as national registrar.

The general society's Louisiana state society offers a program for young women, from birth through age seventeen, called Demoiselles. The Louisiana state society also offers an Honor Corps for men who are husbands, fathers, sons, brothers, or other relatives or close friends of Society members. They also offer a Sister in Arms program for women who do not qualify for membership but want to support the general society.

== Membership ==
Membership in the Daughters of the Revolution of 1776 is reserved for women who are lineal descendants of a patriot of the American Revolution. The original application stated that applicants for membership must be above the age of eighteen, descended from an ancestor who assisted in establishing American Independence during the War of the Revolution as either a military or naval officer; soldier or sailor; an official in the service of any of the Thirteen Colonies or of the United Colonies or States or of Vermont; a member of a committee of correspondence or of public safety; or a recognized patriot who rendered material service in the cause of American Independence.

== Notable members ==
- Mary C. Martin Casey, socialite
- Flora Adams Darling, lineage society leader
- Frances Adelaide Leverich Ingraham, lineage society leader
- Julia Goodrich Roswell-Smith Inness, clubwoman
- Esther Augusta Howard King, clubwoman
- Katherine Bissell Roe, socialite and clubwoman
- Ella Rose Steers, clubwoman

== See also ==
- Daughters of the American Revolution
- National Society of Daughters of Founders and Patriots of America
