= Pine Terrace =

Historic house in New York, United States

- U.S. National Register of Historic Places
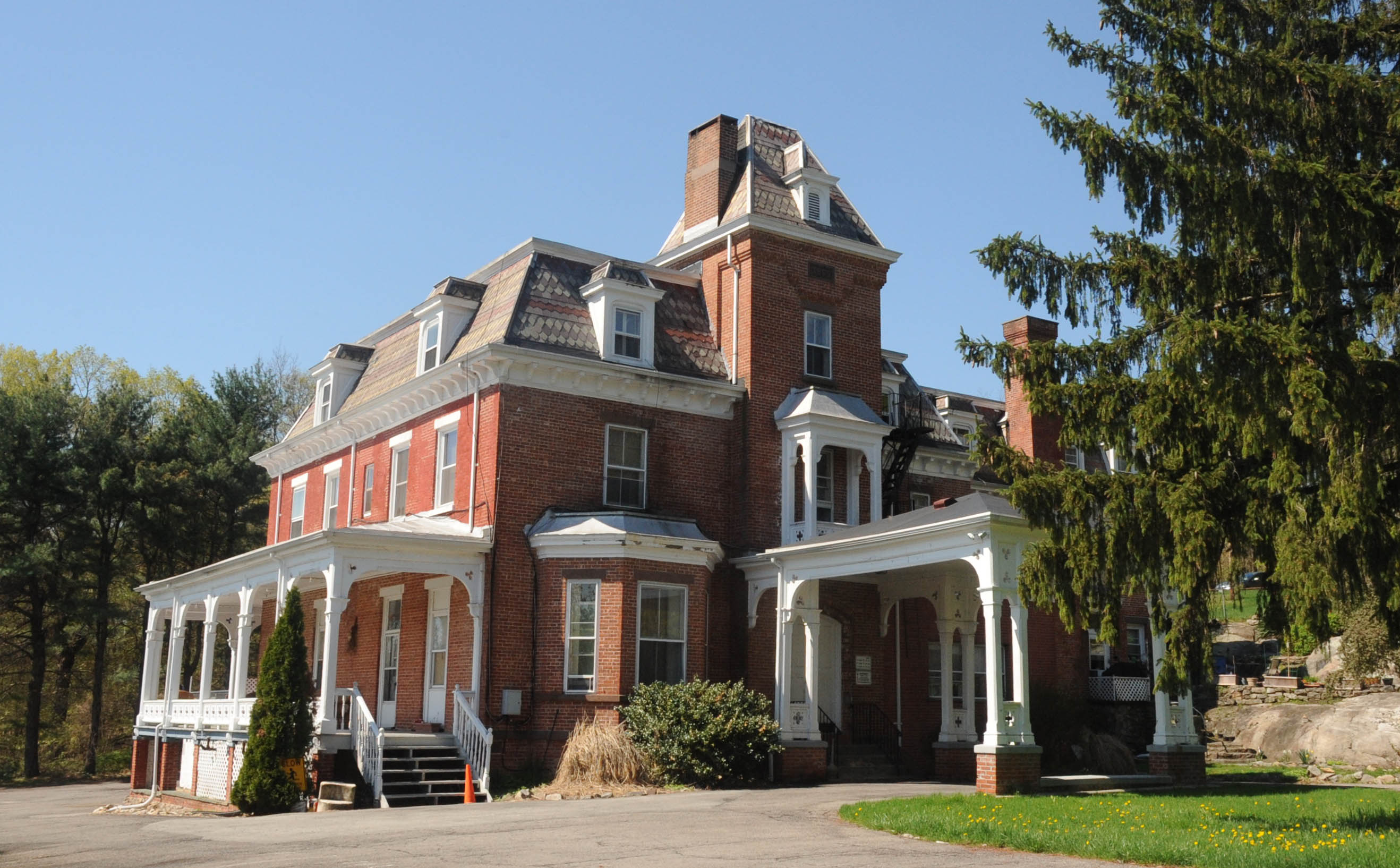

- Location within New York Location within the United States
- Location: Main St., Highland Falls, New York
- Coordinates: 41°21′52″N 73°57′54″W
- Area: 1.6 acres (0.65 ha)
- Built: 1865
- Architectural style: Second Empire
- MPS: Hudson Highlands MRA
- NRHP reference No.: 82001224
- Added to NRHP: November 23, 1982

Pine Terrace is a historic home located at Highland Falls in Orange County, New York. It was built about 1865 and is a two-story brick building with a central three story pavilion. It features a slate mansard roof with a wooden bracketed cornice in the Second Empire style. The wooden porte-cochère has trefoils characteristic of Gothic Revival.

== History ==
The house was completed in 1865, just after the death of its builder, Captain Stephen Romer Roe, a popular steamboat captain on the Hudson River. In later years, Roe operated the West Point Hotel, after managing several steamboats. Roe's wife, Josephine, and son, Major General Charles Francis Roe, maintained the estate after his death.

"Capt. Stephen Romer Roe, who died yesterday at his residence, No. 40 Fifth-avenue, was in his time one of the most widely known and popular of the steamboat Captains upon the Hudson River. He was born in Ulster County on Aug. 15, 1808, and from his early boyhood had an inclination for a steamboat life. After the usual experience, serving in all capacities upon several of the noted boats of the period, he was selected on account of his skill and prudence as Captain of the DeWitt Clinton, at that time the leading boat engaged in the trade between New York and Albany. This position he reached before he attained the age of 27.

After a successful career upon the Clinton he was transferred to the Empire, of Troy, and later to the Iron Witch, which was the first iron-hulled steamer ever built in these waters. This vessel proving a failure, he was made Captain of the famous New World which was finished just after the failure of the Iron Witch. As Captain of the New World, which for years enjoyed the reputation of being the finest and fastest boat ever built, he added to his already great popularity, and during his connection with the noted craft had in his charge at some time nearly every prominent man in the United States.

In 1849 he determined to retire from the river and was induced to take charge of the West Point Hotel, situated within the Academic grounds, and which during his subsequent career became known all over the world as Roe's Hotel. He conducted the hotel business with great success, and was very popular with the army officers and other public men. Among those with whom he was closely intimate was Gov. William H. Seward, who, to mark his confidence and regard for the Captain, appointed him first as an aide upon his staff, and subsequently made him Inspector-General of the State. In 1867 Mr. Roe retired from the management of the hotel and from all business. He is survived by his wife and one son, Lieut. Charles F. Roe, Adjutant of the Second Cavalry. He was during his residence in New York a member of the Protestant Episcopal Church of the Transfiguration, the Rector of which, the Rev. Dr. Houghton, will officiate at the funeral services. The time of the funeral has not yet been fixed, owing to the desire of the family to carry out his wish to be buried at the West Point Cemetery. This requires the consent of the War Department, to which the necessary application has already been made."

— Roe's Obituary printed in The New York Times, December 23, 1885

The gardens of Pine Terrace sat behind the estate, and until recent decades were fairly maintained. Two large classical French Sphynxes adorned the front entrance. In the time after Roe's death, the property became Schildkraut's Pine Terrace Park Hotel, a vegetarian health resort. The house was expanded and an upper floor was converted into an open-air sleeping porch, known as the Roof Garden. Schildkraut's also maintained the estate's ballroom, sitting rooms and lounges for guest usage. After the resort's decline, Pine Terrace was stripped of some interior architectural details and converted into apartments.

It was listed on the National Register of Historic Places in 1982.
