= Ella Rose Steers =

American clubwoman

Ella Rose Steers (1878 or 1879 – January 20, 1941) was an American clubwoman. She served as the New York state regent for the General Society Daughters of the Revolution 1776 and was a charter member of the New Rochelle Catholic Woman's Club.

== Civic roles ==
Steers was a member of the General Society Daughters of the Revolution 1776 and served on the society's executive committee. She also served as the society's New York state regent. She was a charter member of the Catholic Woman's Club in New Rochelle, New York and served as the club's treasurer and chairwoman of real estate.

== Personal life ==
She was married to the real estate broker Abraham Steers. They had three children: George A. Steers, William Edward Steers, and Thomas T. Steers.

She died at the age of sixty-two on January 20, 1941 at New Rochelle Hospital.
