= Katherine Bissell Roe =

American clubwoman

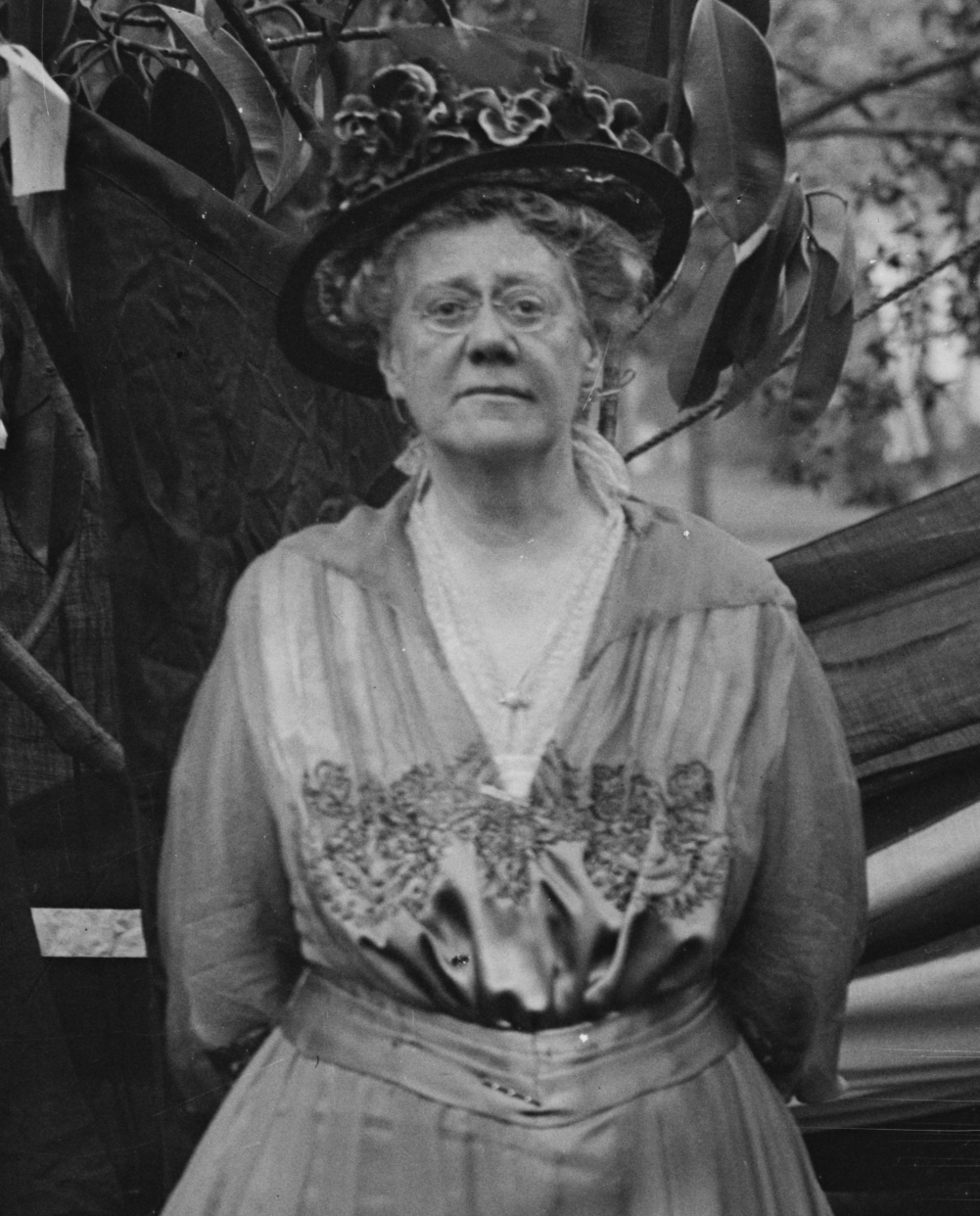
- Roe in 1917
- Born: Katherine Bissell Bogert; September 16, 1852
- Died: April 15, 1921 (aged 68); New York, New York, U.S.
- Resting place: Woodlawn Cemetery
- Occupation: clubwoman
- Spouse: Charles Francis Roe
- Father: John B. Bogert

Katherine Bissell Bogert Roe (September 16, 1852 – April 15, 1921) was an American socialite and clubwoman who served as the New York State Regent for the General Society Daughters of the Revolution 1776.

== Early life ==
Roe was born Katherine Bissell Bogert on September 16, 1852. She was the daughter of hardware merchant John B. Bogert.

== Clubs and activities ==
Roe served on the executive committee of the General Society Daughters of the Revolution 1776 in 1893. In 1898, during the state society's annual meeting in New York City, she was elected as New York State Regent of the Daughters of the Revolution of 1776 after running unopposed. She was also a member of the Huguenot Society of America, the Colonial Dames of America, and the Society of Daughters of Holland Dames.

In 1914, Roe served on the committee for a ball hosted by New York mayor John Purroy Mitchel.

== Personal life ==
She was married to Major General Charles Francis Roe, commander of the New York National Guard, in 1874.

Roe died in 1921 at her home, 35 East 75th Street, of heart disease after also suffering from pneumonia. She was buried at Woodlawn Cemetery.
