= Society of Daughters of Holland Dames =

American lineage society

- Founded: 1895
- Type: lineage society
- Purpose: Historic preservation, education
- Directress General: Suzanne Roff
- Website: hollanddames.org

The Society of Daughters of Holland Dames, Descendants of the Ancient and Honorable Families of New Netherland is a hereditary organization founded in 1895 whose purpose is to preserve and promote the historical legacy of the seventeenth-century Dutch settlers of New Netherland. The Society sponsors emerging scholars researching New Netherland history. Complementing an initiative by the Holland Society of New York, the Society partnered with the New Netherland Institute (NNI) to promote the availability of online transcriptions and translations of the original seventeenth-century New Netherland administrative records housed at the New York State Library and Archives. The translation of these manuscripts has contributed to an understanding of the impact of the Dutch on the founding of the United States of America and became the historical basis of Russell Shorto's book Island at the Center of the World and many other scholarly works. An up-to-date bibliography appears on the website of the New Netherland Institute. In 2018, the Society published Historical Records 1895-2017 and contributed copies to relevant research libraries. In 2020, the Society updated and copyrighted Researching Your Dutch Ancestors: A Practical Guide.

== Donations ==
The Society commissioned a stained-glass window documenting the arrival in 1609 of Henry Hudson's ship the Halve Maen. This is located in the New-York Historical Society's Library. Another window donated by the Society is found in St Mark's Church in-the-Bowery to acknowledge Peter Stuyvesant's contribution to New York City. The Society donated its archives, Members' genealogical records, and a land deed framed with wood from a pear tree in Peter Stuyvesant's orchard to the New-York Historical Society.

== Membership ==
Members of the Society of Daughters of Holland Dames are female direct descendants of an ancestor who was either born in The Netherlands or in New Netherlands of Dutch parentage or whose ancestor lived in New Netherland prior to the Treaty of Westminster in 1674.

== Notable members ==
- Frances Adelaide Leverich Ingraham (died 1934), lineage society leader
- Mary Margaretta Fryer Manning (1844–1928), social leader
- Katherine Bissell Roe (died 1921), socialite
