= French Church du Saint-Esprit =

Church in the Episcopal Diocese of New York

- Église française du Saint-Esprit
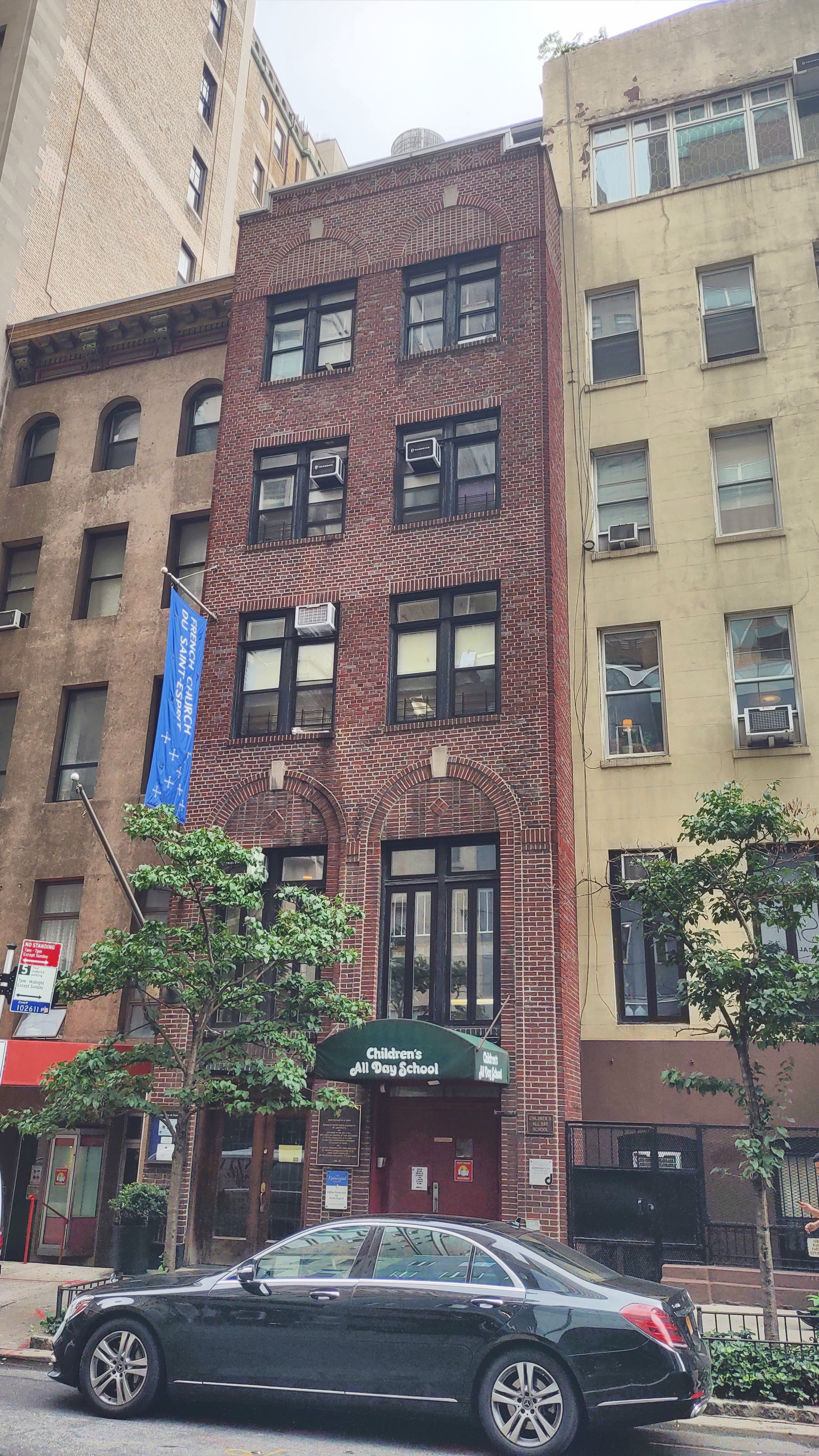
- The street facade (2021)
- French Church du Saint-Esprit
- 40°45′48.6″N 73°58′7.5″W
- Location: 111 East 60th Street, Manhattan, New York City
- Country: United States
- Denomination: Episcopal Church
- Website: stesprit.org

History
- Founded: 1628; 398 years ago
- Dedication: the Holy Spirit
- Consecrated: 1941; 85 years ago

Administration
- Province: Province II
- Diocese: Diocese of New York

Clergy
- Rector: The Rev. Nigel Massey
- Priest: The Rev. Joris Bürmann

The French Church du Saint Esprit (French: Église française du Saint-Esprit, sometimes referred to as St Esprit ) is a French-speaking Protestant church located at 111 East 60th Street in the Lenox Hill neighbourhood of Manhattan, New York City. Affiliated with the Episcopal Church (Anglican Communion), it grew out of a Huguenot refuge founded in New York in the 17th century. As of 2025, Saint-Esprit was one of the only six French-speaking churches in the Episcopal Church in the United States, and the only one in New York.

== History ==
Pastor Jonas Michel (known as Jonas Michaelius), a descendant of Huguenot refugees in the Netherlands, arrived in New York, then New Amsterdam, on 7 April 1628. He founded a Reformed congregation with services in Dutch on Sunday mornings and in French in the afternoons, for Walloon and Huguenot refugees. It first met in a granary in what was to become William Street, next to Pearl Street. The congregation later became the Marble Collegiate Church of New York. The pastor returned to Holland in 1633.

New Amsterdam was bought by the English in 1644, who renamed it New York. In 1685, the French king Louis XIV revoked the Edict of Nantes, a 1598 decree by Henry IV granting religious rights to the Huguenots in France and closing the French Wars of Religion. Protestants from the French Atlantic coast provinces emigrated to England, and from there to the American colonies.

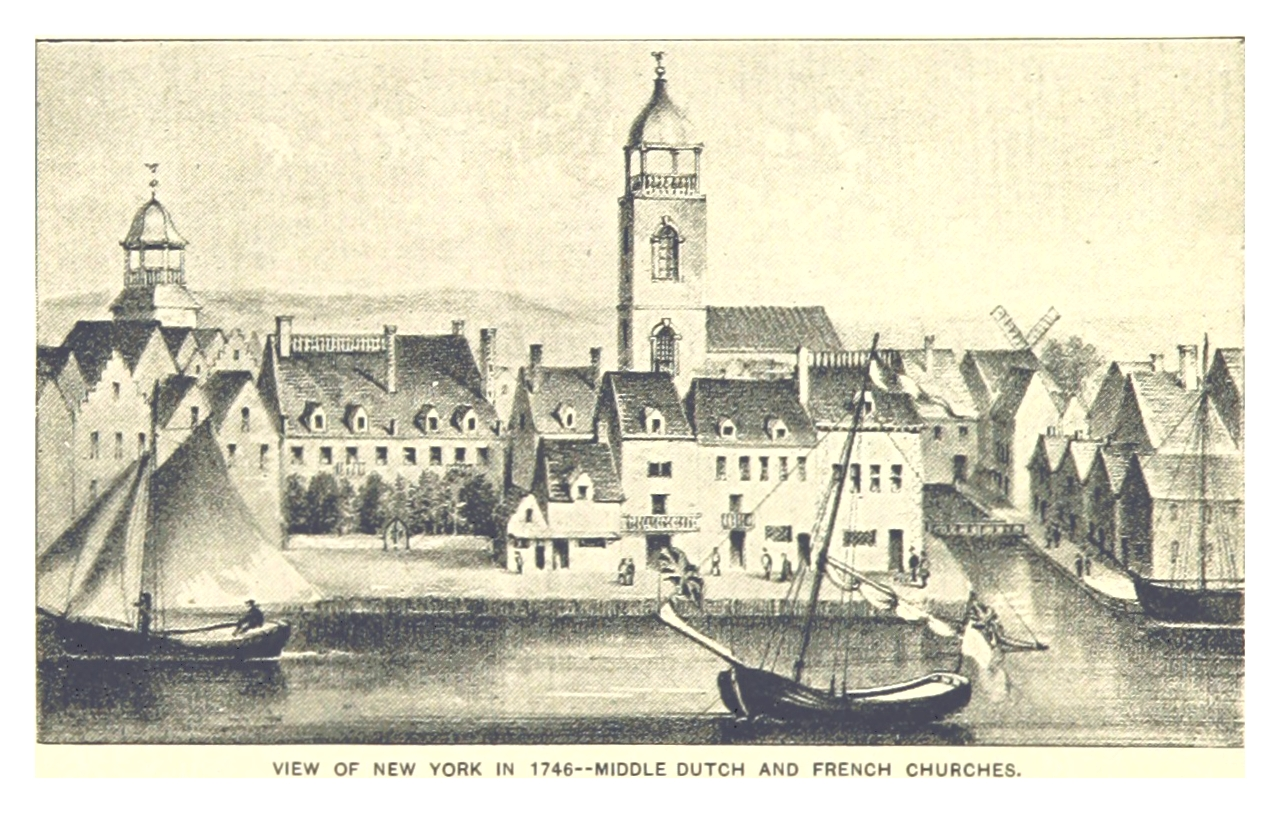
The huguenot church in the middle, View of New York, 1746

In 1686, a Huguenot church was built by the pastor Pierre Daillé, a former teacher at the Academy of Saumur, a Huguenot university in Western France. He also visited the colonies of New Paltz, Staten Island and New Jersey. In 1687 he was assisted by the pastor Pierre Peiret, a native of Béarn.

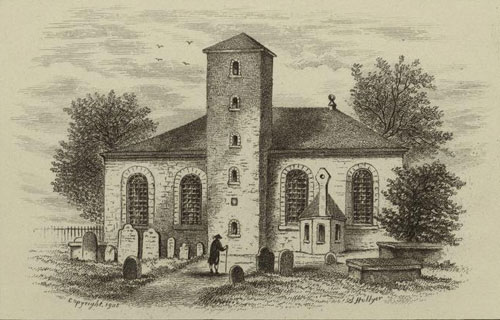
The church of St Esprit and the cemetery 'Old New York scenes, Samuel Hollyer, 1905

In 1704, a new church was built on the corner of Pine Street and Nassau Street, called the Church of the Holy Spirit. It was built of wood and measured 23 by 16 metres on the ground. It had a bell tower topped by a cupola, and a cemetery. Pierre Peiret died in 1704. He was succeeded by Pastor Jacques Laborie, who had trained in Zurich, followed by Pastor Louis Rou. Rou died in 1750, after 40 years in the ministry.

While the first Huguenots were faithful to the Reformed faith and the French language, their descendants gradually assimilated into the English-speaking population and many joined Church of England parishes in the American colonies. Anglicanism at the time being strongly influenced by Calvinist theology (Thirty-nine Articles of Religion of the Church of England). From 1776 to 1796, during the American War of Independence, the church was requisitioned by the British army as a munitions store. In 1795, J. Louis Duby, a Swiss watchmaker, decided to reform the French-speaking congregation. Swiss pastor Pierre Antoine Samuel Albert was appointed in 1797.

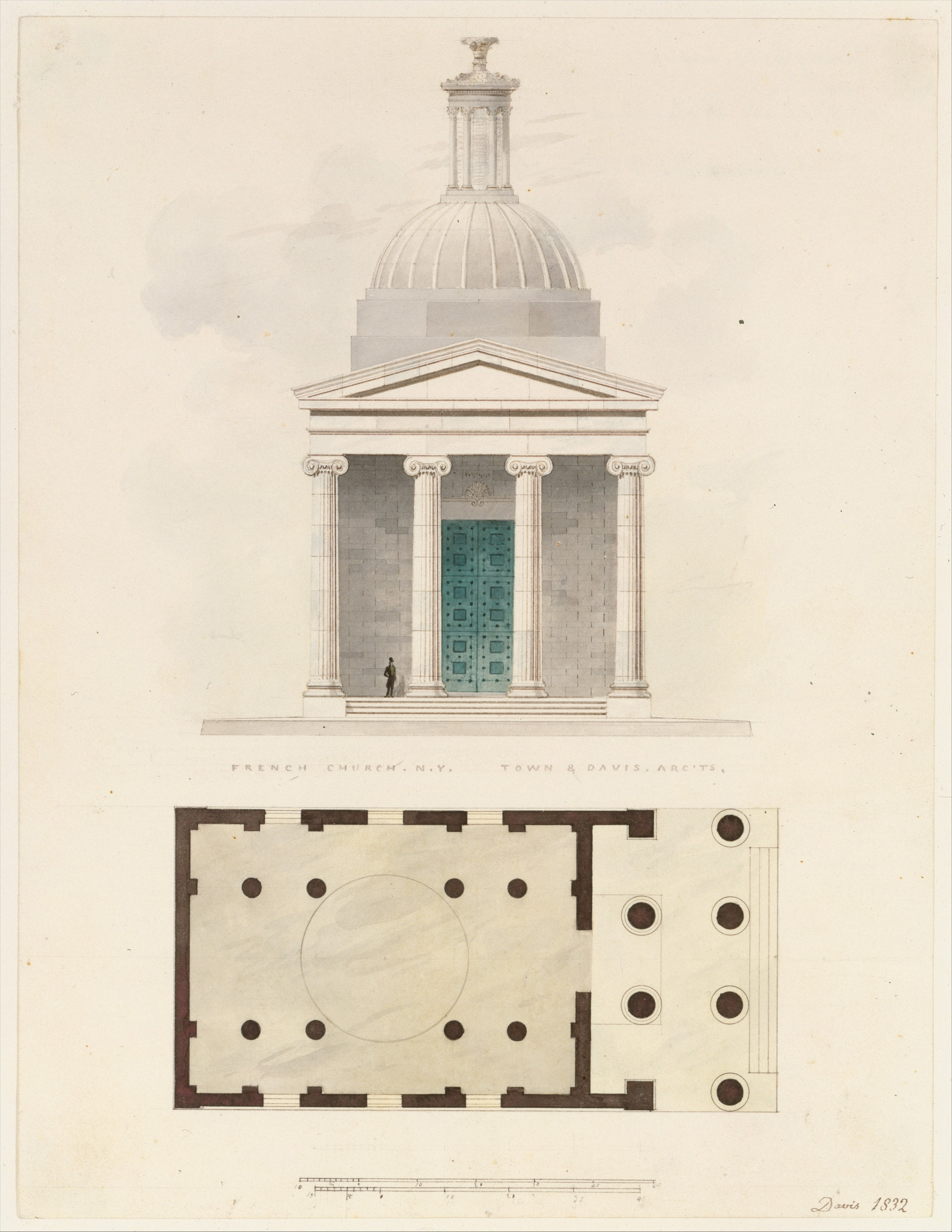
The neoclassical episcopal church, Alexander Jackson Davis, 1832, Metropolitan Museum of Art

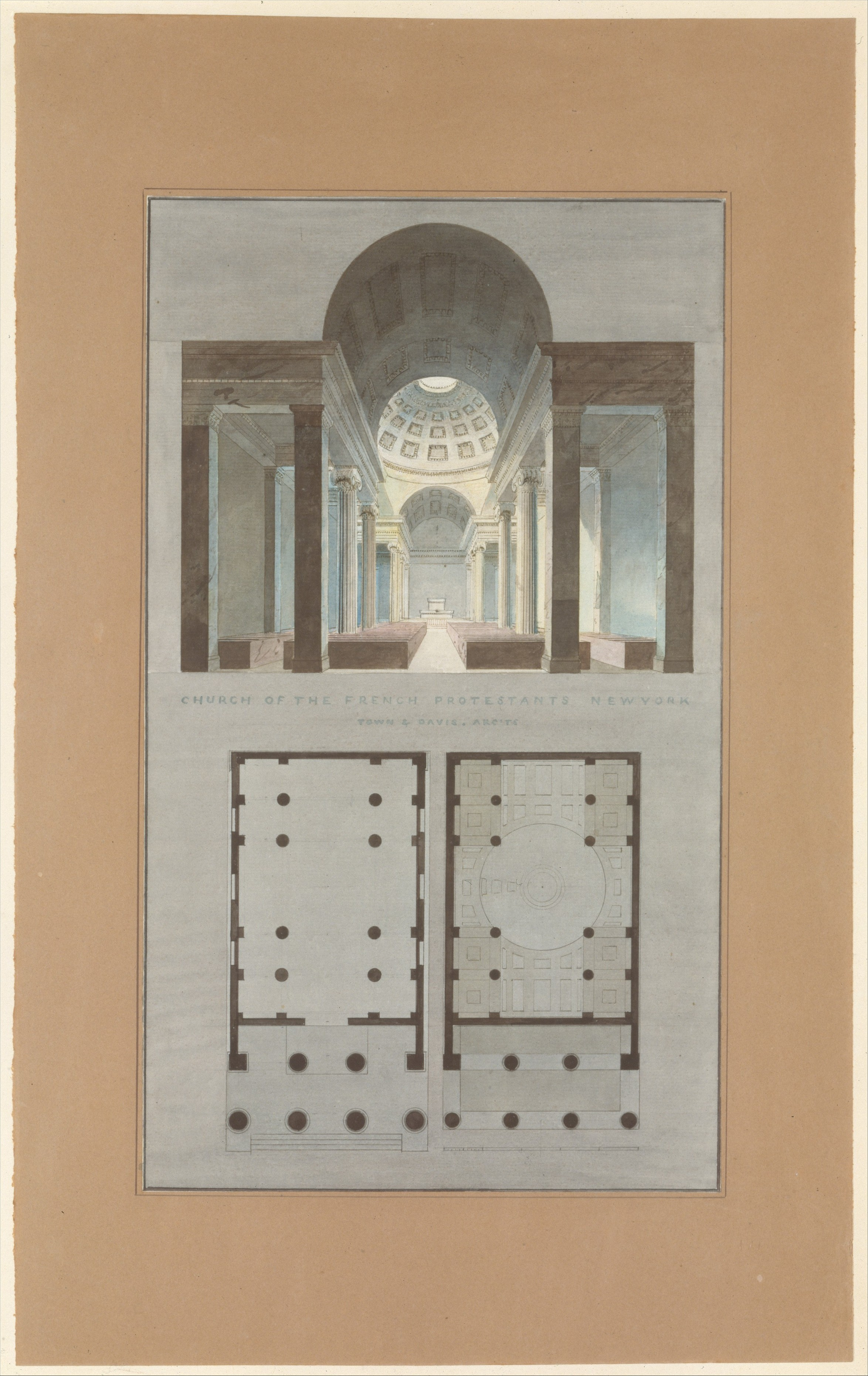
Interior of the church, Alexander Jackson Davis, 1832

In 1804, the church became part of the Episcopal Church in the United States, following the example of many Reformed parishes before it from the time of the Thirteen Colonies, and also to remedy financial problems. It then became part of Trinity Church. Pastor Pierre Albert died in 1806. In 1817, after the end of the Napoleonic Wars and the lifting of the Continental Blockade, he was replaced by the Rev. Henry Penevyre.

In 1831, the parish moved to a new neo-classical church on the corner of Franklin and Church Street. Damaged by fire in 1839, the church was demolished in 1864. In 1862, it moved again to 30 22nd Street West, in a neo-Gothic style. Alfred Wittmeyer became pastor initially 1879, who founded The Huguenot Society of America in 1883. The parish moved to a new Gothic Revival church at 47-57 West 27th Street.

The current church building, which previously housed a school, was bought in 1941.

== Congregational activities ==
=== Religious life ===
Religious services in the church are held in French, with the sermon and certain church communications translated to English. In the first half of 2026, the church held a Holy Communion service on Sundays (followed by a parish reception) and a Midweek Communion service of Wednesdays. Morning prayers were offered on Monday mornings, vespers on Tuesdays, and a Taizé prayer service in Thursdays. Christian education and Bible studies were also offered once a week. The church streamed all of its activities on YouTube.

The church celebrates its Feast of Title every year at Pentecost.

=== Outreach programs ===
As part of keeping its Francophone identity and promoting the French language, the church has offered French classes for free since 1884, as well as hosting a French-speaking book club. The Francophone identity is also reflected in organizing events such as a yearly Bastille Day, Africa Feast, and an Oktoberfest in honour of the German-speaking population of Alsace.

As of 2026, the church is also organizing a monthly social event for French-speaking young adults.

Members of the congregation could also apply for Scholarship Grants and Retraining Grants.

=== Governance ===
As of 2026, the religious activities at the church were directed by a rector, assisted by a curate, a musical director and an organist. The lay governing body, the vestry, had nine members, led by two co-wardens.

== Rectors ==
- Jonas Michel (1628-1633)
- Pierre Daillé (1686-1687)
- Pierre Peiret (1687-1704)
- Jacques Laborie (?-?)
- Louis Rou (?-1750)
- Pierre Antoine Samuel Albert (1797-1806)
- Henry Penevyre (1817-1827), from Neuchâtel
- Antoine Francois Verren (1827-1874), trained at the University of Geneva.
- Leon Pons
- Alfred Wittmeyer (1879-?), from Alsace, founder of The Huguenot Society of America
- Vaillant (-1977)
- Tom Wile (1977-1987), from the American Church in Paris
- Jacques Bossière (1987-1997), previously assistant at the American Cathedral in Paris
- Nigel Massey (1997-), from England, previously an advisor on interfaith relations to the Bishop of London

== See also ==
=== Bibliography ===
- Jon Butler, The Huguenots in America, a Refugee People in New World Society, Cambridge, Harvard University press, 1983
- Isabelle Caroline Caron, « Une fondation française de New Yorkn le tricentenaire huguenot-wallon de 1924 » dans Thomas Wien, Cécile Vidal & Yves Frenette (dir.), De Québec à l'Amérique française, Histoire et mémoire, textes choisis du deuxième colloque de la commission franco-québécoise des lieux de mémoire communs, Québec, Presses de l'université Laval, 2007, p. 175-191.
- Gilbert Chinard, Les réfugiés huguenots en Amérique, Les Belles Lettres, Paris, 1925
- Philippe et Geneviève Joutard, « L'Amérique huguenote est-elle un paradoxe ? », Bulletin de la Société de l'histoire du protestantisme français, t. 151, 2005, p. 65-70

=== Relevant articles ===
- The Huguenot Society of America
