= Abraham Arnold =

United States Army general

Abraham Kerns Arnold
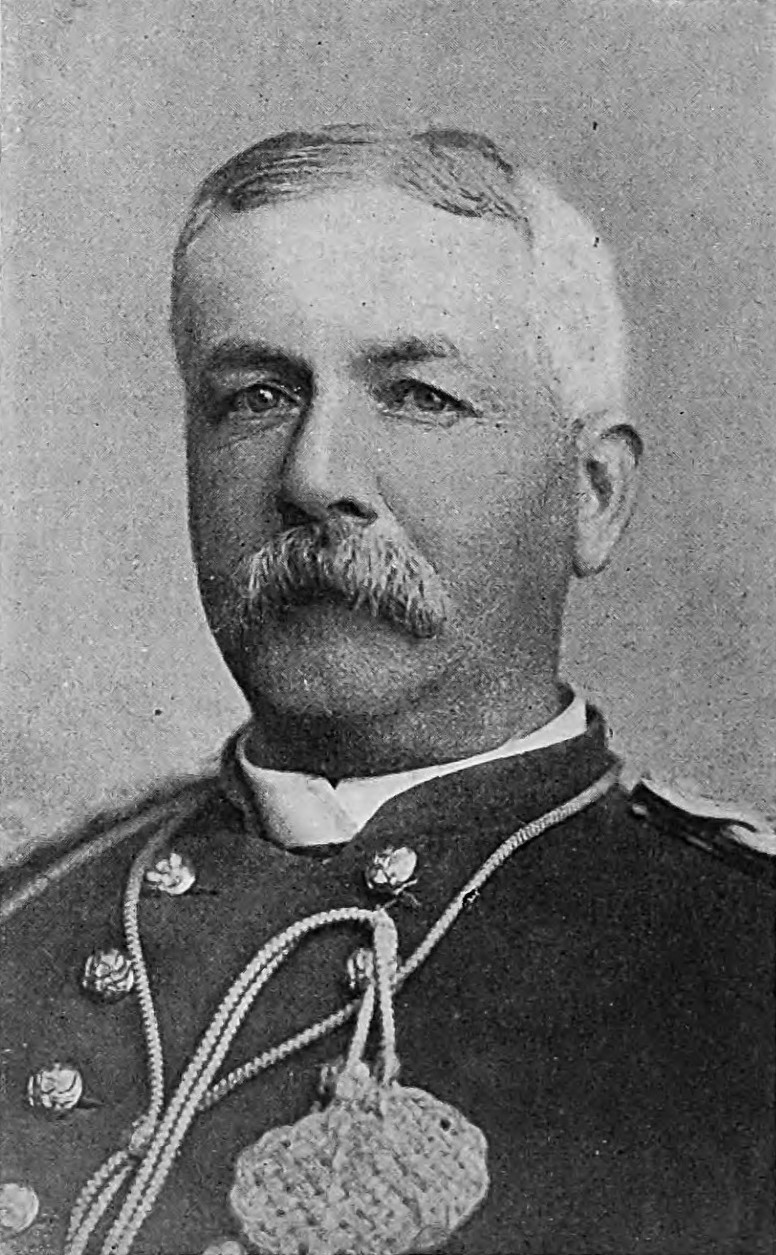
- Born: March 24, 1837; Bedford, Pennsylvania, U.S.
- Died: November 23, 1901 (aged 64); Cold Spring-On-Hudson, New York, U.S.
- Burial place: Cemetery of Saint Philip's Church; Garrison, New York
- Military career
- Allegiance: United States of America; Union
- Branch: United States Army; Union Army
- Service years: 1859–1901
- Rank: Colonel (USA); Brigadier General (USV)
- Unit: 5th U.S. Cavalry
- Commands: 1st U.S. Cavalry; 8th U.S. Cavalry
- Conflicts: American Civil War: Battle of Gaines' Mill; Battle of Todds Tavern; Battle of Davenport Bridge; Indian Wars: Apache Wars; Battle of Cibecue Creek; Spanish–American War
- Awards: Medal of Honor

Abraham Kerns Arnold (March 24, 1837 – November 23, 1901) was a U.S. Cavalry officer during the American Civil War and, while a captain in the 5th U.S. Cavalry, received the Medal of Honor for leading "a gallant charge against a superior force of the enemy, extricated his command from a perilous position in which it had been ordered" against Confederate forces at Davenport Bridge, Virginia, on May 10, 1864.

== Early life and education ==
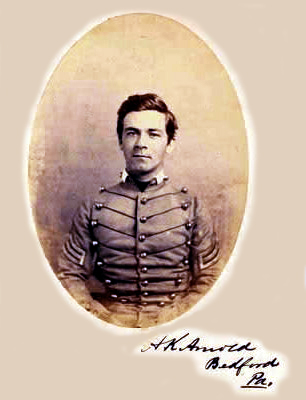
At West Point in 1859

Born in Bedford, Pennsylvania, Arnold entered West Point and graduated with the class of 1859 as a brevet Second Lieutenant in the 2nd Cavalry Regiment.

== Career ==
Participating in campaigns against the Comanche while stationed in Fort Inge, Arnold held a distinguished service record during the American Civil War. Promoted to first lieutenant in April 1861, he served as adjutant of the 5th Cavalry Regiment. He was cited "for gallant and meritorious services" at Gaines' Mill and Todds Tavern, brevetted to captain and major after both engagements respectively. He was awarded the Medal of Honor for his actions during the Battle of Davenport Bridge leading his regiment in a cavalry charge against superior Confederate forces to rescue men under his command and preventing their capture.

In June 1869, he was promoted to full major of the 6th U.S. Cavalry. By early 1879, he was directing operations against the Apaches in southeastern Arizona, accompanying an expedition into Mexico later that year in pursuit of renegade Apaches to Lake Guzman. As acting assistant adjutant general to General Orlando B. Willcox, Arnold would also take part in the Battle of Cibecue Creek on August 30, 1881. As a lieutenant colonel in 1886, he would also fight in the expedition against the Crows of the North Plains the following year. He would hold a number of command posts during the next twelve years, including a term as commander of the Cavalry and Light Artillery School (1895-1898), and was promoted to colonel in 1891.

During the Spanish–American War, Arnold accepted a field commission as brigadier general of volunteers and led 2nd U.S. Division of the Seventh Army Corps in Cuba from January 16, 1898, until April 1, 1899. After the war, he reverted to his permanent rank of colonel in command of the 1st U.S. Cavalry in May 1899.

General Arnold was a Companion of the California Commandery of the Military Order of the Loyal Legion of the United States.

== Death and legacy ==
He retired on March 25, 1901, and died several months later in Cold Spring-On-Hudson, New York, on November 23, 1901. His grave can be found in the Cemetery of Saint Philip's Church Garrison, New York.

Arnold Hall at Fort Riley, Kansas, where he served as commandant of the Cavalry and Artillery School and the Army post, was named in his honor.

== Bibliography ==
- Notes on Horses for Cavalry Service (1869)
- A System of Exercises and Gymnastics for Use in School of Soldier Mounted (1887)
- The Cavalry at Gaines' Mill (1889)
- Special Report on Combined Manoeuvers at the Cavalry and Light Artillery (1896)

== See also ==
- List of Medal of Honor recipients
- List of American Civil War Medal of Honor recipients: A–F
