= Charles Francis Roe =

American military officer

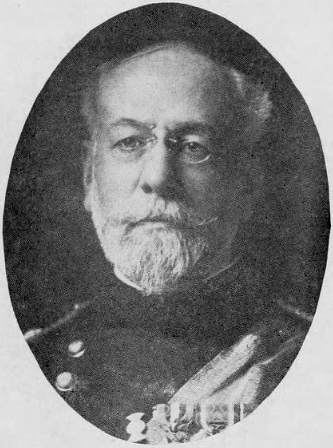

2nd Commander-General of the Military Order of Foreign Wars
- In office 1911–1914
- Preceded by: Alexander S. Webb
- Succeeded by: William B. Caperton

Personal details
- Born: May 1, 1848 Highland Falls, New York, U.S.
- Died: December 1, 1922 (aged 74) Highland Falls, New York, U.S.
- Resting place: Woodlawn Cemetery
- Spouse: Katherine Bissell Bogert
- Education: United States Military Academy

Military service
- Allegiance: United States
- Branch/service: United States Army National Guard
- Years of service: 1868–1912
- Rank: Major general
- Commands: New York National Guard
- Battles/wars: American Indian Wars

Charles Francis Roe (May 1, 1848 – December 1, 1922) was an American military officer. He commanded the citizen soldiers of New York as Major General of the New York National Guard from 1898 to 1912. From 1911 to 1914, he served as Commander-General of the Military Order of Foreign Wars.

== Early life and family ==
Roe was born on May 1, 1848, in Highland Falls, New York, to Captain Stephen Romer Roe and Josephine Roe. He grew up at Pine Terrace, and managed the estate following his father's death.

== Career ==
Roe graduated from the United States Military Academy in 1868. He served in the cavalry in the Indian Wars from 1868 to 1888. He was the first ranking military officer on the site of the Little Big Horn massacre and wrote the official report on the incident. In 1889, he organized a cavalry, Troop A, for the New York Militia. In 1898, when the New York National Guard reorganized, Governor Frank S. Black promoted him to the rank of Major General and placed him in command of all citizen soldiers in the state. He served in that capacity until 1912.

He was the Commander-General of the Military Order of Foreign Wars from 1911 to 1914.

== Personal life ==
Roe was married to Katherine Bissell Bogert.

He died on December 1, 1922, in Highland Falls, New York.
