= Martinus Schoonmaker =

New York City clergyman

Martinus Schoonmaker (1737–1824) was a New York City clergyman.

== Biography ==
He was born in Rochester, Ulster County, New York in 1737. He was licensed to preach in 1765, was pastor of the Dutch Reformed church at Gravesend for several years, and then of the one at Harlem till 1784, when he fixed his residence at Flatbush, and assumed charge of the six congregations in Kings County. During the Revolution he was an earnest and influential Whig. He was the last of the ministers that preached only in Dutch till the end of their lives. The church, six-sided and with a funnel-roof, where he ministered was at New Utrecht. He died in Flatbush, New York in 1824.
