= George P. Buell =

American civil engineer and soldier

George Pearson Buell
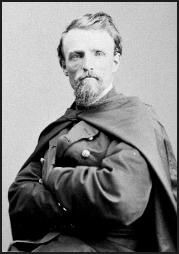
- George Pearson Buell
- Born: October 4, 1833; Lawrenceburg, Indiana, U.S.
- Died: May 31, 1883 (aged 49); Nashville, Tennessee, U.S.
- Burial place: Mount Olivet Cemetery
- Military career
- Allegiance: United States of America; Union
- Branch: Union Army; United States Army
- Service years: 1861–81
- Rank: Brevet Brigadier General
- Conflicts: American Civil War; Battle of Perryville; Battle of Stones River; Battle of Chickamauga; Battle of Bentonville

George Pearson Buell (October 4, 1833 – May 31, 1883) was an American civil engineer and soldier. He served as a Union Army general during the American Civil War, and remained in the United States Army following the conflict.

== Early life and career ==
George Pearson Buell was born in Lawrenceburg, Indiana, in 1833, a first cousin of future Union general Don Carlos Buell. He attended Norwich University in 1856, and later became City Engineer of Leavenworth, Kansas. He then mined for gold and later was a civil engineer in Colorado.

== Civil War service ==
Buell chose to defend the Union cause and entered the volunteer ranks of his birth state in 1861. On December 17 he was appointed to the rank of lieutenant colonel in the 58th Indiana Infantry. He was promoted to colonel on June 24, 1862. Buell led the 58th Indiana during the Battle of Perryville on October 8. Buell then led his regiment during the Battle of Stones River in late December into January 1863. During the fight he took over command of Brig. Gen. Milo S. Hascall's brigade when that officer was needed for division command, and Lt. Col. James T. Embree then led the 58th Indiana. After the battle Buell was given brigade command and led several different brigades in the Army of the Cumberland throughout 1863 and 1864. He also led a brigade during the Battle of Chickamauga on September 19–20, 1863.

On January 23, 1865, President Abraham Lincoln nominated Buell for appointment to the grade of brevet brigadier general of volunteers for his management of disassembled Federal pontoon trains used to construct pontoon bridges over waterways, to rank from January 12, 1865, and the United States Senate confirmed the appointment on February 14, 1865. Buell commanded various brigades (and for two brief periods a division) of the Army of Georgia for the remainder of the war. He led a brigade during the Battle of Bentonville on March 19–21, consisting of the 13th Michigan Volunteer Infantry Regiment, the 21st Michigan Volunteer Infantry Regiment, and the 69th Ohio Infantry. The brigade suffered 205 casualties during this fight. Buell was mustered out of the volunteer service on July 25.

== Postwar ==
Buell elected to continue in the U.S. Army after the Civil War. He was promoted to lieutenant colonel in the regular army on July 28, 1866, in the 29th U.S. Infantry Regiment. Buell was appointed a brevet colonel in the regular army to rank from March 2, 1867, a reward for his performance in November 1863 at Missionary Ridge during the war. On December 3, 1867, President Andrew Johnson nominated Buell for appointment to the grade of brevet brigadier general in the regular army, to date from March 2, 1867, and the United States Senate confirmed the appointment on February 14, 1868.

On March 15, 1869, Buell was transferred to the 11th U.S. Infantry Regiment. He led the command in several actions during the Red River War in Texas and Oklahoma, 1874, against Comanche and Kiowa. He was promoted to colonel on March 20, 1879, in command of the 15th U.S. Infantry Regiment. He died in 1883 while on duty in Nashville, Tennessee, and is buried there at Mount Olivet Cemetery.

== See also ==
- List of American Civil War brevet generals (Union)
