= Corps =

Military unit size designation

Corps (/kɔːr/; plural corps /kɔːrz/; from French corps, from the Latin corpus "body") is a term used for several different kinds of organization. A military innovation by Napoleon, the formation was formally introduced March 1, 1800, when Napoleon ordered General Jean Victor Marie Moreau to divide his command into four corps. The size of a corps varies greatly, but two to five divisions and anywhere from 40,000 to 80,000 are the numbers stated by the US Department of Defense.

Within military terminology a corps may be:

- an operational formation, sometimes known as a field corps, which consists of two or more divisions, such as the Corps d'armée, later known as I Corps ("First Corps") of Napoleon I's Grande Armée);
- an administrative corps (or mustering) – that is a specialized branch of a military service (such as an artillery corps, an armoured corps, a signal corps, a medical corps, a marine corps, or a corps of military police);
- or, in some cases, a distinct service within a national military (such as the United States Marine Corps).

These usages often overlap.

Before it came into force in 1800, the idea of field corps was already in its infancy (for example, Jourdan's Army of Sambre and Meuse in 1795 was divided into 3 corps), but these were not permanent, skillfully organized formations, and the idea could not take a definite form due to the relatively small size of the individual armies. Only Moreau granted the corps legal status in 1800; Napoleon finally developed them in 1805. Napoleon's corps innovations were among the "keys" to his early imperial military victories.

Corps may also be a generic term for a non-military organization, such as the US Peace Corps and European Solidarity Corps.

== Military usage ==
NATO Map Symbols

a friendly combined arms corps
a hostile combined arms corps
a friendly airborne corps
a friendly infantry corps
a hostile tank corps

=== Operational formation ===
In many armies, a corps is a battlefield formation composed of two or more divisions, and typically commanded by a lieutenant general. During World War I and World War II, due to the large scale of combat, multiple corps were combined into armies which then formed into army groups. In Western armies with numbered corps, the number is often indicated in Roman numerals (e.g., VII Corps).

==== Australia and New Zealand ====
The Australian and New Zealand Army Corps was raised in 1914, consisting of Australian and New Zealand troops, who went on to fight at Gallipoli in 1915. In early 1916, the original corps was reorganized and two corps were raised: I ANZAC Corps and II ANZAC Corps. In the later stages of World War I, the five infantry divisions of the First Australian Imperial Force (AIF)—consisting entirely of personnel who had volunteered for service overseas—were united as the Australian Corps, on the Western Front, under Lieutenant General Sir John Monash.

During World War II, the Australian I Corps was formed to co-ordinate three Second Australian Imperial Force (2nd AIF) units: the 6th, 7th and 9th Divisions, as well as other Allied units on some occasions, in the North African campaign and Greek campaign. Following the commencement of the Pacific War, there was a phased withdrawal of I Corps to Australia, and the transfer of its headquarters to the Brisbane area, to control Allied army units in Queensland and northern New South Wales (NSW). II Corps was also formed, with Militia units, to defend south-eastern Australia, and III Corps controlled land forces in Western Australia. Sub-corps formations controlled Allied land forces in the remainder of Australia. I Corps headquarters was later assigned control of the New Guinea campaign. In early 1945, when I Corps was assigned the task of re-taking Borneo, II Corps took over in New Guinea.

==== Canada ====
Canada first fielded a corps-sized formation in the First World War; the Canadian Corps was distinctive in that its composition did not change from inception to the war's end, in contrast to British corps, whose subordinate divisions were reassigned according to operational requirements. The Canadian Corps consisted of four Canadian divisions. After the Armistice, the peacetime Canadian Militia was nominally organized into corps and divisions but no full-time formations larger than a battalion were ever trained or exercised. Early in the Second World War, Canada's contribution to the British-French forces fighting the Germans was limited to a single division. After the fall of France in June 1940, a second division moved to England, coming under command of a Canadian corps headquarters. This corps was renamed I Canadian Corps as a second corps headquarters was established in the UK, with the eventual formation of five Canadian divisions in England. I Canadian Corps eventually fought in Italy, II Canadian Corps in northwest Europe, and the two were reunited in early 1945. After the formations were disbanded after VE Day, Canada has never subsequently organized a corps headquarters.

==== China ====
The National Revolutionary Army (NRA) corps (軍團) was a type of military organization used by the Chinese Republic, and usually exercised command over two to three NRA divisions and often a number of independent brigades or regiments and supporting units. The Chinese Republic had 133 corps during the Second Sino-Japanese War. After losses in the early part of the war, under the 1938 reforms, the remaining scarce artillery and the other support formations were withdrawn from the division and was held at corps, or army level or higher. The corps became the basic tactical unit of the NRA having strength nearly equivalent to an allied division.

The modern People's Liberation Army Ground Force group army (集团军) is the closest equivalent of a corps. After the military reforms of the early 2010s, a typical PLA group army consists of six combined arms brigades, plus additional artillery, air defence, engineering, sustainment, special operations and army aviation assets. Each formation contains approximately 30,000 combat troops and several thousands more supporting personnel.

==== France ====
The French Imperial Army under Napoleon used corps-sized formations (French: corps d'armée) as the first formal combined-arms groupings of divisions with reasonably stable manning and equipment establishments. Napoleon first used the corps d'armée in 1805. The use of the corps d'armée was a military innovation that provided Napoleon with a significant battlefield advantage in the early phases of the Napoleonic Wars. The corps was designed to be an independent military group containing cavalry, artillery and infantry, and capable of defending against a numerically superior foe. This allowed Napoleon to mass the bulk of his forces to effect a penetration into a weak section of enemy lines without risking his own communications or flank. This innovation stimulated other European powers to adopt similar military structures. The corps has remained an echelon of French Army organization to the modern day.

==== Germany ====
As fixed military formation already in peace-time it was used almost in all European armies after Battle of Ulm in 1805. In Prussia it was introduced by Order of His Majesty (German: Allerhöchste Kabinetts-Order) from 5 November 1816, in order to strengthen the readiness to war.

==== India ====
The Indian Army has 14 corps, each commanded by a general officer commanding (GOC), known as the corps commander, who holds the rank of lieutenant general. Each corps is composed of three or four divisions. There are three types of corps in the Indian Army: strike, holding and mixed. The corps HQ is the highest field formation in the army.

==== Pakistan ====
The Pakistan Army has nine manoeuvre corps, each commanded by a lieutenant general. Each corps is composed of at least two divisions. The corps HQ is the highest field formation in the army.

==== Poland (1938–1939) ====
The Polish Armed Forces used independent operational groups in the place of the corps before and during World War II. An example would be Independent Operational Group Polesie. The groups, as the name indicates, were more flexible and showed greater capacity to absorb and integrate elements of broken units over a period of just a couple days and keep cohesion during the September Campaign than more traditional army units such as divisions, regiments, or even brigades.

==== Russia ====
In Russia (then the Empire), corps were officially introduced in 1810, under Emperor Alexander I, when 5 corps of different compositions were formed from all branches of the military.

==== United Kingdom ====
Wellington formed a corps d'armée in 1815 for commanding his mixed allied force of four divisions against Napoleon.

When the British Army was expanded from an expeditionary force in the First World War, corps were created to manage the large numbers of divisions. The British corps in World War I included 23 infantry corps and a few mounted corps. The word was adopted for other special formations such as the Officers Training Corps. Military training of teenage boys is undertaken at secondary schools through the Combined Cadet Force, in which participation was compulsory at some schools in the 1950s. Schoolboy jargon called the CCF simply "Corps".

The British Army still has a corps headquarters for operational control of forces. I Corps of the British Army of the Rhine was redesignated the Allied Rapid Reaction Corps in 1994. It is no longer a purely British formation, although the UK is the "framework nation" and provides most of the staff for the headquarters. A purely national Corps headquarters could be quickly reconstituted if necessary.

It took command of the International Security Assistance Force in Afghanistan on 4 May 2006. Previously, it was deployed as the headquarters commanding land forces during the Kosovo War in 1999 and also saw service in Bosnia and Herzegovina, commanding the initial stages of the IFOR deployment prior to that in 1996. Otherwise, the only time a British corps headquarters has been operationally deployed since 1945 was II Corps during the Suez Crisis.

==== United States ====
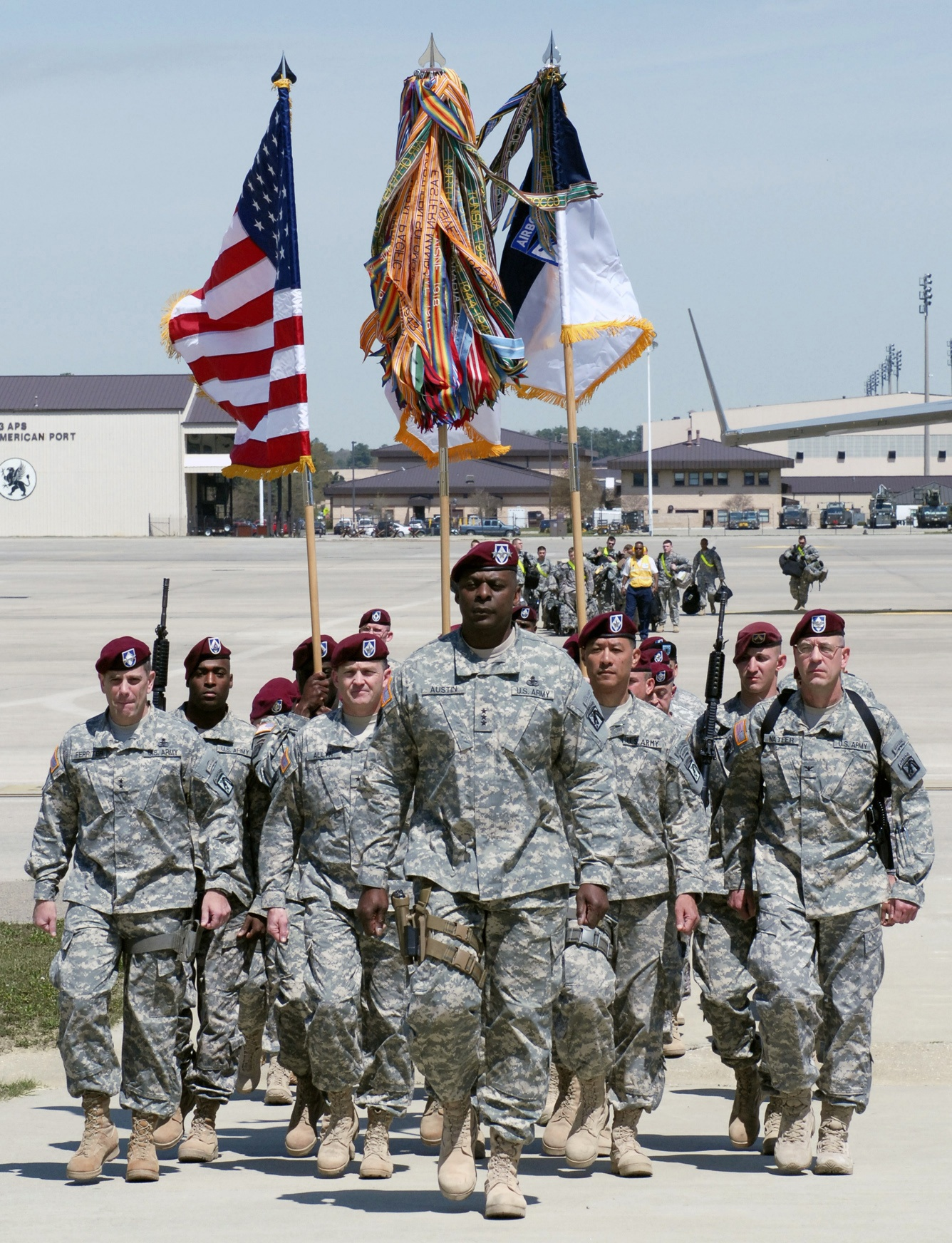
The XVIII Airborne Corps command group, led by LTG Lloyd Austin, returns home from Operation Iraqi Freedom in 2009

The structure of a field corps in the United States Army is not permanent. On the battlefield, the corps is the highest level of the forces that is concerned with actual combat and operational deployment. Higher levels of command are concerned with administration rather than operations, at least under current doctrine. The corps provides operational direction for the forces under its command.

As of 2014, the active field corps in the US Army are I Corps, III Corps, and XVIII Airborne Corps; their lineages derive from three of the corps formed during World War I (I and III Corps) and World War II (XVIII Airborne Corps). On 12 February 2020, it was announced that the Army was reactivating V Corps to bolster the presence of US forces in Europe.

===== American Civil War =====
The first field corps in the United States Army were legalized during the American Civil War by an act of Congress on 17 July 1862, although the term had been used previously to refer to any large portion of the army. Major General George B. McClellan, for example, planned to organize the Army of the Potomac into corps of two or more divisions and about 25,000 soldiers. However, he delayed doing so, partly for lack of experienced officers, and partly for political reasons, until March 1862 when President Lincoln ordered their creation.

The exact composition of a corps in the Union Army varied during the war, though it usually consisted of two to six divisions (three on average) for approximately 36,000 soldiers. After Ambrose Burnside was given command of the Army of the Potomac in November 1862, he reorganized it into three "grand divisions" of two corps and a cavalry division each, but this structure was abolished when Joseph Hooker took over February 1863. This also led to the creation of a dedicated Cavalry Corps of three divisions and horse artillery assigned to the corps headquarters. In the early years of the war, field artillery was either part of an artillery reserve under direct army control or assigned to individual divisions. However, after the Battle of Chancellorsville the divisional artillery was placed under corps control, with each corps assigned a brigade of four to six batteries commanded by the senior-most artillery officer. In general, the other field armies tended to model their organization after the Army of the Potomac, including the gradual development of corps.

Corps were commanded by major generals because Congress refused to promote officers past that grade (with the exception of Ulysses S. Grant to lieutenant general in 1864). To assist with their command, generals were allowed a number of aides-de-camp and a general staff of other officers. This staff consisted of a chief of cavalry, a chief of artillery, and representatives of the War Department's various bureaus: an assistant adjutant general, a quartermaster, an assistant inspector general, a commissary of subsistence, an ordnance officer (all with the rank of lieutenant colonel), and a medical director. However, there were no dedicated combat service support formations as part of the corps. This meant that either civilian workers had to be hired or line soldiers detailed from their units to carry out the necessary tasks.

Initially, corps were numbered in relation to their field army, such as I Army Corps, Army of the Potomac. After a while these numerical designations became unique to each corps regardless of the army to which they were assigned. Although designated with numbers that are sometimes the same as those found in the modern US Army, there is no direct lineage between the 43 Union field corps of the Civil War and those with similar names in the modern era, due to congressional legislation caused by the outcry from veterans of the Grand Army of the Republic during the Spanish–American War.

In the Confederate States Army, field corps were authorized in November 1862. They were commanded by lieutenant generals, and were usually larger than their Union Army counterparts because their divisions contained more brigades, each of which could contain more regiments. All of the Confederate corps at the Battle of Gettysburg, for instance, exceeded 20,000 men. However, for both armies, unit sizes varied dramatically with attrition throughout the war. In Civil War usages, by both sides, it was common to write out the number, thus "Twenty-first Army Corps", a practice that is usually ignored in modern histories of the war.

===== Spanish–American War =====
Although the US Army in the years following the Civil War lacked standing organization at the corps and division levels, it moved swiftly to adopt these during the mobilization for the Spanish–American War in the spring of 1898. On 7 May, General Order 36 called for the establishment of seven "army corps" (repeating the nomenclature of the Civil War); an eighth was authorized later that month. Two of these saw action as a unit: the Fifth in Cuba and the Eighth in the Philippines; elements of the First, Fourth, and Seventh made up the invasion force for Puerto Rico (the Second, Third, and Seventh provided replacements and occupation troops in Cuba, while the Sixth was never organized). The corps headquarters were disbanded during the months following the signing of the peace treaty (with the exception of the Eighth Army Corps, which remained active until 1900 due to the eruption of the Philippine–American War), and like the corps of the Civil War, their lineage ends at that point.

===== World Wars I and II =====
During World War I, the American Expeditionary Forces (AEF) adopted the common European usage of designating field corps by Roman numerals. Several "corps areas" were designated under the authority of the National Defense Act of 1920, but played little role until the Army's buildup for World War II. While some of the lower numbered corps were used for various exercises, the inter-war years corps served mostly as a pool of units. During that war, the Marine Corps organized corps headquarters for the first time, the I Marine (later III Amphibious Corps) and V Amphibious Corps. The Army ultimately designated 25 field corps (I–XVI, XVIII–XXIV, XXXVI, and I Armored Corps) during World War II.

===== Cold War and 21st century =====
After the Korean War, the Army and Marines diverged in their approach to the concept of the field corps. The Army continued to group its divisions into traditional corps organizations in the Continental United States (CONUS), West Germany (V Corps and VII Corps), and South Korea (I Corps). However, during the Vietnam War, the Army designated its corps-level headquarters in South Vietnam as I Field Force and II Field Force to avoid confusion with the ARVN corps areas. As of July 2016, the Army deactivated all corps headquarters save three CONUS based corps (I Corps – Washington, III Corps - Texas, and XVIII Airborne Corps – North Carolina).

In the 1960s, the Marine Corps activated the I Marine Expeditionary Force (I MEF) on Okinawa (based in California since 1971) and II Marine Expeditionary Force (II MEF) in North Carolina, and re-activated the III Amphibious Corps (which had been deactivated in 1946) as III Marine Expeditionary Force (III MEF) in South Vietnam (re-deployed to Okinawa in 1971). In 1965, all three MEFs were subsequently re-designated as Marine amphibious forces or MAFs, and in 1988 all three Marine Corps corps-level commands were again re-designated as Marine expeditionary forces (MEF). The MEF had evolved into a self-contained, corps-level, Marine air–ground task force (MAGTF) consisting of a MEF headquarters group, a Marine division, a Marine aircraft wing, and a force service support group (re-designated as Marine logistics group in 2005).

==== Soviet Union ====
The pre–World War II Red Army of the former USSR had rifle corps much like in the Western sense with approximately three divisions to a corps. However, after the war started, the recently purged Soviet senior command (Stavka) structure was apparently unable to handle the formations, and the armies and corps were integrated. Rifle corps were re-established during the war after Red Army commanders had gained experience handling larger formations. Before and during World War II, however, Soviet armoured units were organized into corps. The pre-war mechanized corps were made up of divisions. In the reorganizations, these "corps" were reorganized into tank brigades and support units, with no division structure. Owing to this, they are sometimes, informally, referred to as "brigade buckets".

After the war, the tank and mechanized corps were re-rated as divisions. During the reforms of 1956–58, most of the corps were again disbanded to create the new combined arms and tank armies. A few corps were nevertheless retained. The Vyborg and Archangel Corps of the Leningrad Military District were smaller armies with three low-readiness motorized rifle divisions each. In the 1980s "Unified Corps" on the brigade pattern were created in the Belorussian Military District (Western TVD/Strategic Direction) and the 48th Separate Guards Army Corps in the Transbaikal Military District, but abandoned after a few years.

The Soviet Air Forces used ground terminology for its formations down to squadron level. As intermediates between the aviation division and the air army were corps—these also had three air divisions each.

===== Air Defence Corps =====
An Air Defence Corps ('KPVO') is an operational-tactical formation (in the past - the highest tactical formation) of the former Soviet Air Defence Forces and now Russian Air Defence Forces/Aerospace Forces. The purpose of the such a corps is to protect important administrative, industrial and economic centers and regions of the country, groupings of troops (forces) and military facilities within the established limits of responsibility against air strikes. In organizational terms, an air defence corps is part of the district (or a separate army) of the Air Defence Forces. Also some air defence corps were separate.

On the basis of individual corps, air defence zones or air defence corps areas could be created. The first KPVO were created in February 1938 for the air defence of Moscow, Leningrad and Baku (respectively 1st, 2nd and 3rd) based on anti-aircraft artillery divisions and air defence brigade (3rd KPVO). The staff of the KPVO included: 4-6 anti-aircraft artillery regiments, 1 anti-aircraft machine-gun regiment, 1 searchlight regiment (or battalion), 1-2 regiments (or divisions) barrage balloons, 1- 2 regiments (or battalions) of visual observation, warning and communications (VNOS), and a separate communications battalion. From September 1938 to November 1940, the KPVO also included 1-2 regiments (battalions) of local air defence.

During the Great Patriotic War from November 1941 to April 1944 the air defence corps were renamed into air defence corps areas (such as the Stalingrad Corps Region). The corps districts included up to 9 anti-aircraft artillery regiments and 14 separate anti-aircraft artillery battalions, up to 3 anti-aircraft machine-gun regiments, 1 searchlight regiment, 1 regiment (or division) of barrage balloons, up to 4 regiments (or separate battalions) VNOS, and a communications regiment (or a separate battalion). In 1945, air defence corps could include 1 anti-aircraft artillery brigade or division.

Air defence fighters operating within the limits of responsibility of the KPVO was transferred to the corps. By the end of the war, there were 14 KPVO in the Active Army, of which 5 corps continued to carry out the tasks assigned to them even after the war, and the rest of the corps were disbanded.

In July 1947, all KPVO were renamed anti-aircraft artillery corps. In January 1949, part of these corps was reorganized into air defence areas. From December 1948 to January 1949, all anti-aircraft artillery corps were disbanded.

In June 1954, for the defense of the main industrial and economic centers and regions of the USSR, 10 air defence corps were re-created. At the same time, in addition to anti-aircraft artillery formations, fighter aviation regiments and divisions were included in the corps. Since the late 1950s, anti-aircraft artillery units have been replaced by anti-aircraft missile formations and formations of radio engineering troops. Searchlight and barrage balloon units were also abolished.

In the Warsaw Pact countries, groupings similar to the Soviet air defence corps were also created. In June–July 1960, all KPVO were enlarged and consisted of: anti-aircraft missile regiments and brigades, air defense fighter regiments, radio engineering regiments and brigades, separate electronic warfare battalions, regiments and battalions of communications and logistics institutions.

=== Administrative corps ===
In many English-speaking countries and other countries influenced by British military traditions, a corps is also a grouping of personnel by common function, also known as an arm, service, mustering or branch.

==== Britain ====
In the British Army, an administrative corps performs much the same role – for personnel that otherwise lack them – as a ceremonial regiment. An administrative corps therefore has its own cap badge, stable belt, and other insignia and traditions.

- Intelligence Corps
- RAF Regiment
- Royal Logistic Corps
- Corps of Royal Marines
- Royal Corps of Signals

In some cases, the term corps is also used informally, for looser groupings of independent regiments and other units – and without many or any unifying regalia, military traditions or other accoutrements – such as the Royal Armoured Corps or the "Corps of Infantry".

==== Australia ====
In Australia, soldiers belong foremost to a corps which defines a common function or employment across the army. The Australian Army has a system of coloured lanyards, which each identify a soldier as part of a specific corps (or sometimes individual battalion). This lanyard is a woven piece of cord which is worn on ceremonial uniforms and dates back to the issue of clasp knives in the early 20th century which were secured to the uniform by a length of cord.

If a soldier is posted to a unit outside of their parent corps, except in some circumstances the soldier continues to wear the hat badge and lanyard of their corps (e.g. a clerk posted to an infantry battalion would wear the hat badge of the Royal Australian Army Ordnance Corps but would wear the lanyard of the battalion they are posted to).

==== Canada ====
In Canada, with the integration of the Canadian Army into the Canadian Forces, the British corps model was replaced with personnel branches, defined in Canadian Forces Administrative Orders (CFAOs) as "...cohesive professional groups...based on similarity of military roles, customs and traditions." CFAO 2-10) However, the Armour Branch continued to use the title Royal Canadian Armoured Corps, the Infantry Branch continued to use the Royal Canadian Infantry Corps designation, and the Artillery Branch uses the term Royal Regiment of Canadian Artillery.

When the Army, Royal Canadian Navy, and Royal Canadian Air Force were merged in 1968 to form the Canadian Forces, the Royal Canadian Dental Corps and Royal Canadian Army Medical Corps were deactivated and merged with their Naval and Air Force counterparts to form the Dental Branch (Canadian Forces) and the Canadian Forces Medical Service of the Canadian Forces Health Services Group (CF H Svcs Gp). The Royal Canadian Army Service Corps transport and supply elements were combined with the Royal Canadian Ordnance Corps to form the Logistics Branch The Royal Canadian Army Service Corps clerical trades were merged with the Royal Canadian Army Pay Corps and the Royal Canadian Postal Corps to form the Administration Branch (later merged with the Logistics Branch)

Other "corps", included: Canadian Engineer Corps, Signalling Corps, Corps of Guides, Canadian Women's Army Corps, Royal Canadian Army Veterinary Corps, Canadian Forestry Corps, Canadian Provost Corps and Canadian Intelligence Corps.

==== India ====
Administrative corps in the Indian Army include:

- Army Armoured Corps
- Army Aviation Corps
- Army Dental Corps
- Army Education Corps
- Army Medical Corps
- Army Ordnance Corps
- Army Postal Service Corps
- Army Service Corps
- Corps of Army Air Defence
- Corps of Electronics and Mechanical Engineers
- Corps of Engineers
- Corps of Military Police
- Corps of Signals
- Defence Security Corps
- Intelligence Corps
- Pioneer Corps
- Remount and Veterinary Corps

==== New Zealand ====
In New Zealand, soldiers belong foremost to a corps which defines a common function or employment across the army.

A corps in the New Zealand Army is an administrative group that comprises members of similar work functions.

If a soldier is posted to a unit outside of their parent corps, except in some circumstances the soldier continues to wear the hat badge of their corps (e.g. a supply technician posted to an infantry battalion would wear the hat badge of the Royal New Zealand Army Logistic Regiment.

==== United States ====
The Department of Defense; the Department of Transportation; and the United States Department of Health and Human Services use corps administratively in several ways.

1) In the title of the United States Marine Corps, Corps is used as a service-branch designator, in much the same way as Force and Guard are used for the US Air Force and US Coast Guard.

2) The US Army (all components; Regular Army, Army Reserve, and Army National Guard) uses administrative corps, also known as army branches, to group personnel with a common function. These include the Acquisition Corps, Adjutant General's Corps, Chaplain Corps, Chemical Corps, Civil Affairs Corps, Cyber Corps, Dental Corps*, Corps of Engineers, Finance Corps, Judge Advocate General's Corps, Logistics Corps, Medical Corps*, Medical Service Corps*, Medical Specialist Corps*, Military Intelligence Corps, Military Police Corps, Nurse Corps*, Ordnance Corps, Psychological Operations Corps, Quartermaster Corps, Signal Corps, Transportation Corps, and Veterinary Corps.* Each of these corps is also considered a regiment for purposes of: "... affiliation, ... loyalty and commitment, ... sense of belonging, ... unit esprit, and ... war fighting ethos." However, these regiments have no tactical function. The six corps (annotated by an asterisk above after each applicable corps' name) of the Army Medical Department (AMEDD) are included in the AMEDD Regiment .

3) US Navy officers who are not line officers (i.e., those who exercise general command authority and are eligible for operational command positions, as opposed to officers who normally exercise authority only within their own specialty) are commissioned into various Staff Corps. These officers are specialists in career fields that are professions unto themselves, such as ministers, civil engineers, architects, dentists, lawyers, physicians, healthcare administrators, healthcare scientists, clinical care providers, nurses, financial managers, and logistics and supply specialists. These corps include the Chaplain Corps, Civil Engineer Corps, Dental Corps*, Judge Advocate General's Corps, Medical Corps*, Medical Service Corps*, Nurse Corps*, and the Supply Corps. The Navy also has a Hospital Corps consisting of enlisted medical technicians. The Hospital Corps, along with the four Navy health services corps listed above (indicated by asterisk), is one of the five corps of the Navy Bureau of Medicine and Surgery.

4) The US Air Force uses the title corps to designate several non-tactical organizations. These corps include five distinct health services corps of the United States Air Force Medical Service (AFMS). The AFMS corps are the Biomedical Sciences Corps, Dental Corps, Medical Corps, Medical Service Corps, and Nurse Corps. The Air Force also has its own Chaplain Corps and Judge Advocate General's Corps.

5) In the US Armed Forces, the term corps is also used in a general sense to mean the collective membership of a specified military body. Those uses include: the Officer Corps and Noncommissioned Officer Corps (NCO Corps) of the armed forces, either collectively or individually by branch of service; the United States Corps of Cadets at the United States Military Academy and the United States Coast Guard Corps of Cadets of the United States Coast Guard Academy; the overall program title and aggregate collection of cadets and midshipmen enrolled in the Reserve Officer Training Corps (ROTC) of the several services (i.e., Army ROTC, Navy ROTC, and Air Force ROTC), as well as the cadet organizations of the six federally recognized United States Senior Military Colleges (The Citadel, Norwich University, Texas A&M University, the University of North Georgia, the Virginia Military Institute, and Virginia Polytechnic Institute and State University); and the members of the Naval Sea Cadet Corps.

== Non-military use ==
The ambassadors, consuls and other foreign embassy staff in a country are collectively referred to as the diplomatic corps (French: corps diplomatique). In Australia, embassy vehicles have licence plates beginning with the letters DC (or DX).

The Salvation Army calls its local units/church "corps" (e.g. The Rockford Temple Corps, The St. Petersburg Citadel Corps), echoing the pseudomilitary name and structure of the organization.

In the United Kingdom, the Royal Observer Corps was a civil defence unit from 1925 until disbanded in 1995.

In the US, there are non-military, administrative, training and certification corps for commissioned officers of the government's uniformed services, such as the United States Public Health Service Commissioned Corps and the National Oceanic and Atmospheric Administration Commissioned Corps.

Many volunteer municipal or university ambulance, rescue, and first-aid squads are known as VACs (volunteer ambulance corps). Prominent examples are the Order of Malta (the largest in Ireland), Hatzolah (largest VAC network worldwide), Hackensack VAC. The usage of the term ambulance corps dates to American Civil War Major General George B. McClellan's General Order No 147 to create an "ambulance corps" within the Union Army. GO 147 used corps in one of its standard military senses. However, subsequent formations of non-military ambulance squads continued to use the term, even where they adhere less to paramilitary organizational structure.

The Peace Corps was organized by the United States as an "army" of volunteers.

Some non-governmental organizations (NGOs) are known as corps. Examples include Global Health Corps and Mercy Corps.

A patent examiner in the US is a member of the Examiner Corps.

== See also ==
- List of corps of the United States
- List of military corps
