= First Army Corps (Spanish–American War) =

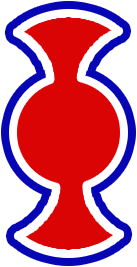
- Active: May 7, 1898 – January 16, 1899
- Country: United States of America
- Branch: Army of the United States
- Type: Corps
- Role: Infantry
- Engagements: Spanish–American War

Commanders
- Notable commanders: Major General John R. Brooke

Insignia
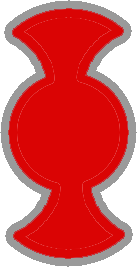
- First Corps 1st Division

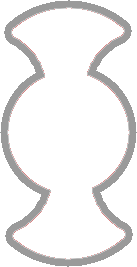
- First Corps 2nd Division

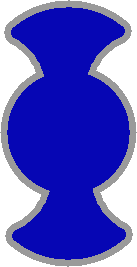
- First Corps 3rd Division

The First Army Corps was a unit of the United States Army raised for the Spanish–American War.

As relations between Spain and the United States deteriorated in the spring of 1898, the leaders of the U.S. Army began to plan for its first large-scale campaign since the Civil War, which had ended more than 30 years previously. On April 15, 1898, the regiments of the Regular Army were ordered to various assembly points in the South, with only a handful of units to remain at their peacetime posts. The troops assembling at Camp Thomas, Georgia (in the Chickamauga Battlefield Park) were formed into a provisional field corps on April 23 under the command of Major General John R. Brooke.

After the declaration of war, General Order 36 of May 7 approved the organization of eight "army corps," each of which was to consist of three or more divisions of three brigades each. Each brigade was to have approximately 3,600 officers and enlisted men organized into three regiments and, with three such brigades, each division was to total about 11,000 officers and men. Thus the division was to be about the same size as the division of 1861, but army corps were to be larger. The division staff initially was to have an adjutant general, quartermaster, commissary, surgeon, inspector general and engineer, with an ordnance officer added later. The brigade staff was identical except that no inspector general or ordnance officer was authorized.

General Order 46 of May 16, 1898 assigned commanding officers and training camps to the new corps. Major General Brooke was named as commander of First Army Corps, which was to assemble at Camp Thomas, Georgia.

In July 1898, First Division of the First Army Corps (division numbers were not unique in this era) was assigned to the Puerto Rico expedition. On July 23, General Brooke was relieved by Major General James F. Wade, who in turn relinquished command to Brigadier General Royal T. Frank; on August 2, Frank relinquished command to Major General Joseph C. Breckinridge. (Many accounts claim that First Corps led the invasion of Puerto Rico (as the Fifth had done at Santiago), but the troops under Brooke were the only element of the corps to take part in the expedition, which was headed by the Army's commanding general, Nelson A. Miles and included troops led by generals Guy Vernon Henry and Theodore Schwan who commanded the First Divisions of the Fourth and Seventh corps.)

As hostilities concluded and conditions at Camp Thomas deteriorated, it was decided to break up the encampment and move the troops to healthier grounds. On August 22, the Second Division of the corps was ordered to Lexington, Kentucky; the Third Division was sent to Knoxville, Tennessee at the same time. Corps headquarters and General Breckinridge moved with the Second Division.

Major General James H. Wilson (USV) succeeded General Breckenridge in command of First Army Corps on October 20, 1898. At the end of 1898, he was ordered to prepare his corps headquarters and a portion of the corps for service in Cuba. The movement began on January 7, 1899 and the troops were assigned to occupation duty in Matanzas and Santa Clara provinces.

Shortly after the movement to Cuba, First Army Corps was "discontinued" on January 16, 1899; its troops remaining in the United States were assigned to Second Army Corps as separate brigades.

== Organization ==
First Army Corps Commander - MG John R. Brooke

1st Division - MG James H. Wilson

- 1st Brigade - BG O. H. Ernst
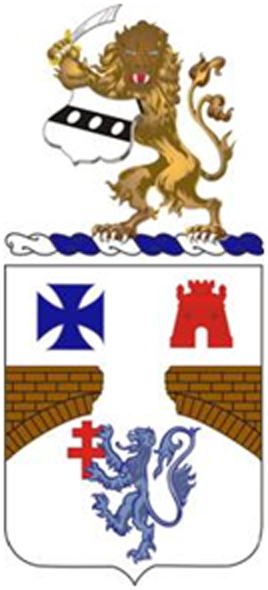
  - 16th Pennsylvania Volunteer Infantry - Col. Willis J. Huntings
  - 2nd Wisconsin Volunteer Infantry
  - 3rd Wisconsin Volunteer Infantry
- Other Units
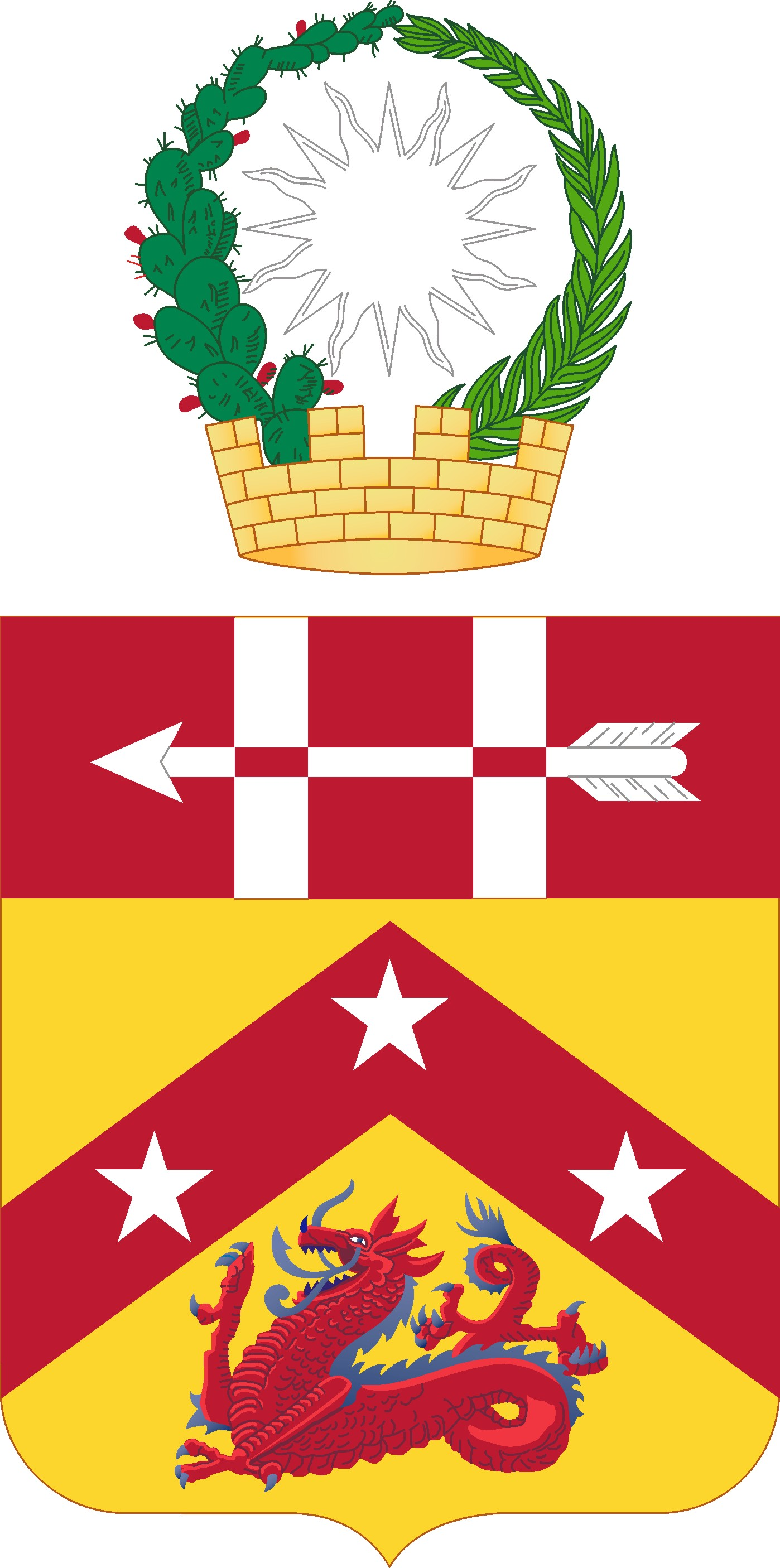
  - 3rd Artillery, Light Battery F
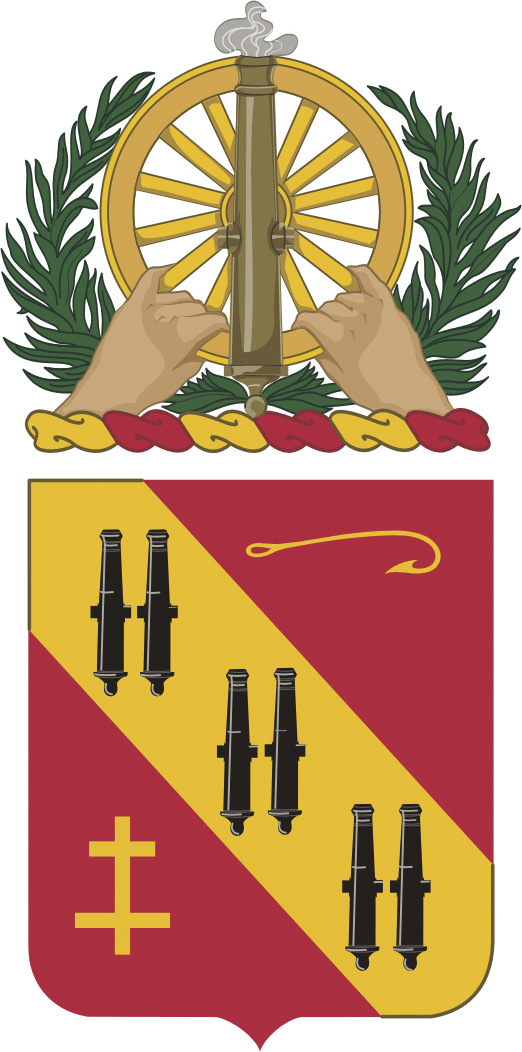
  - 5th Artillery, Light Battery B
  - New York Volunteer Cavalry, Troop C

Provisional Division (Second) BG Guy V. Henry

- 2nd Brigade BG Peter C. Hains
  - 19th Infantry Regiment
  - 6th Massachusetts Volunteer Infantry Regiment
  - 6th Illinois Volunteer Infantry Regiment - Col. David Jack Foster
  - 2nd Cavalry Regiment Troop B
- Independent Brigade (Third) BG Theodore Schwan
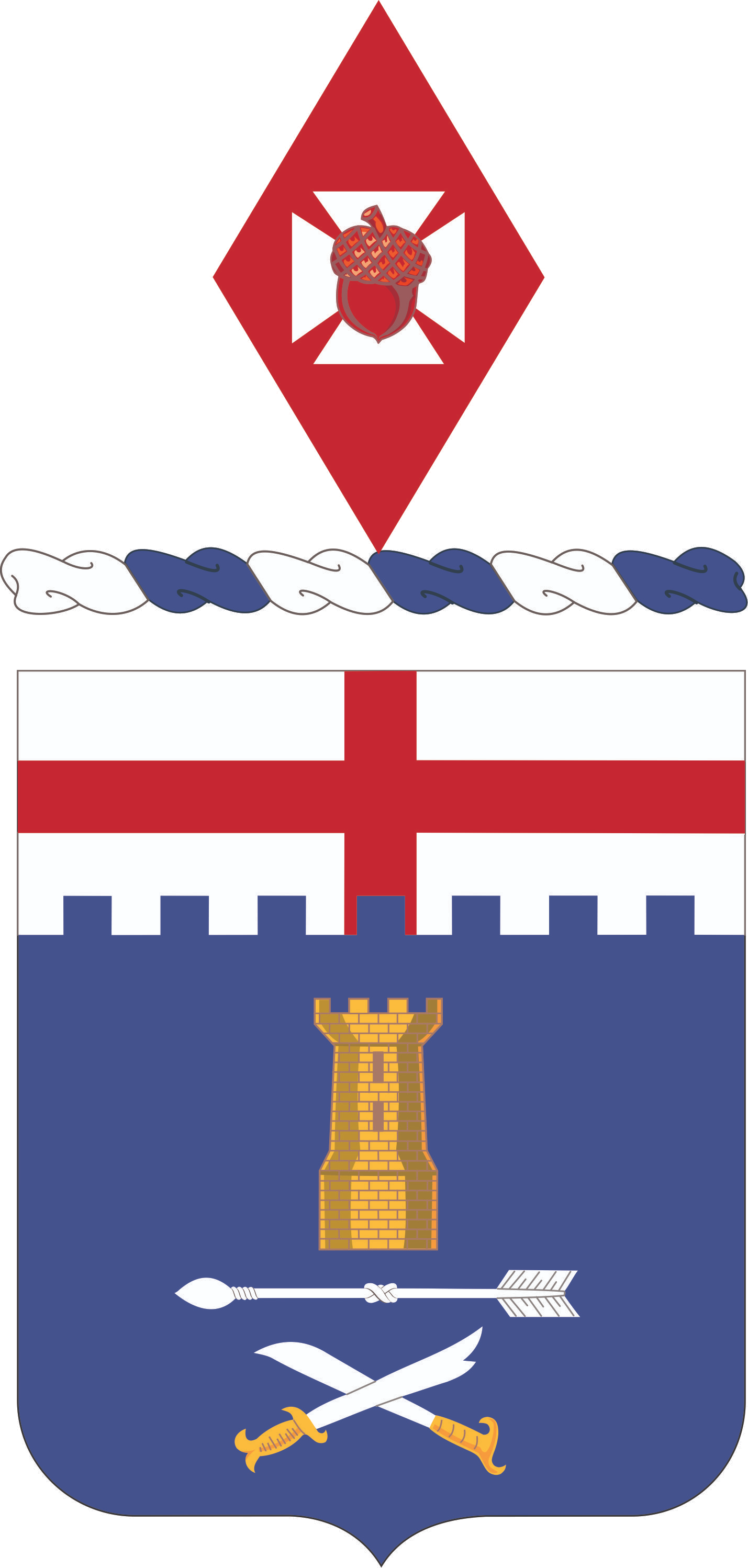
  - 11th Infantry Regiment (3 battalions)
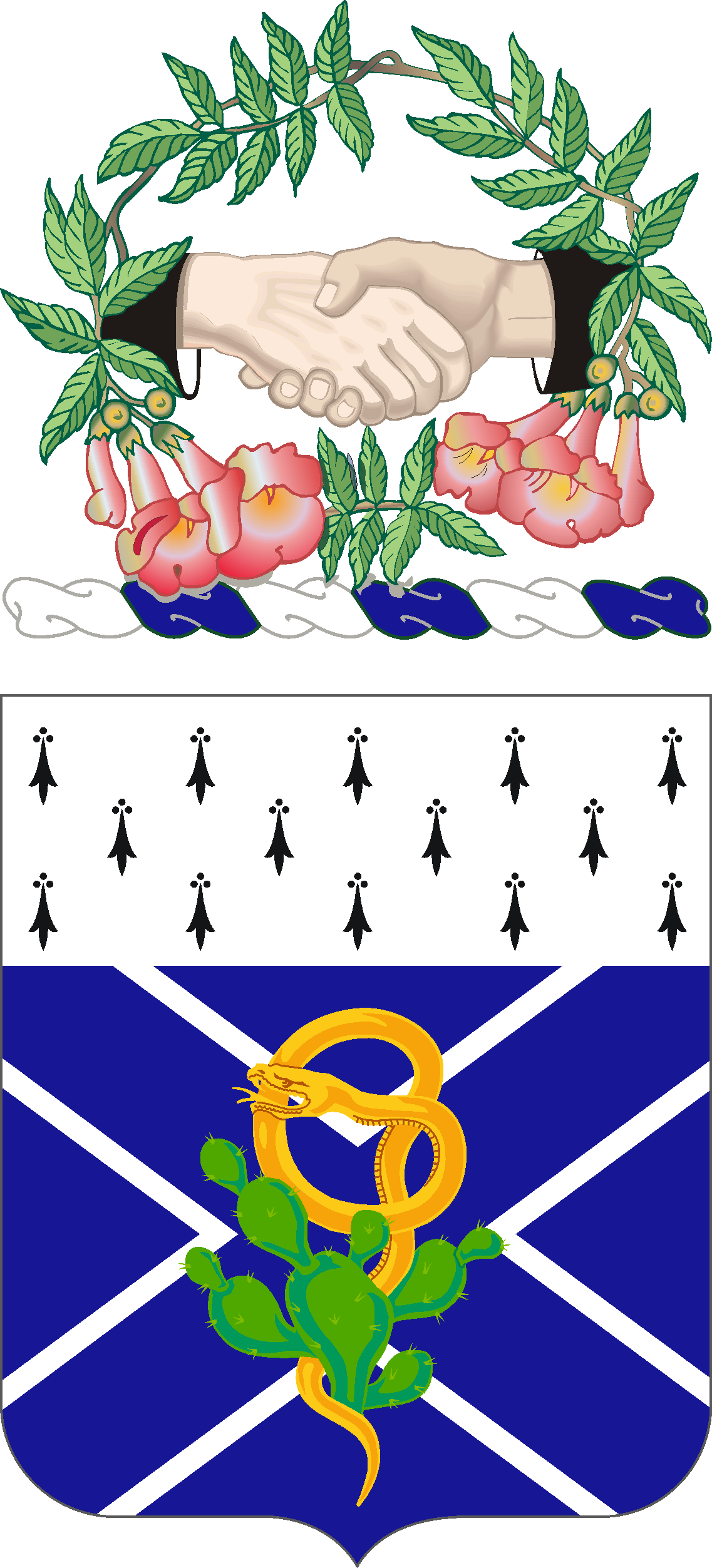
  - 1st Kentucky Volunteer Infantry Regiment
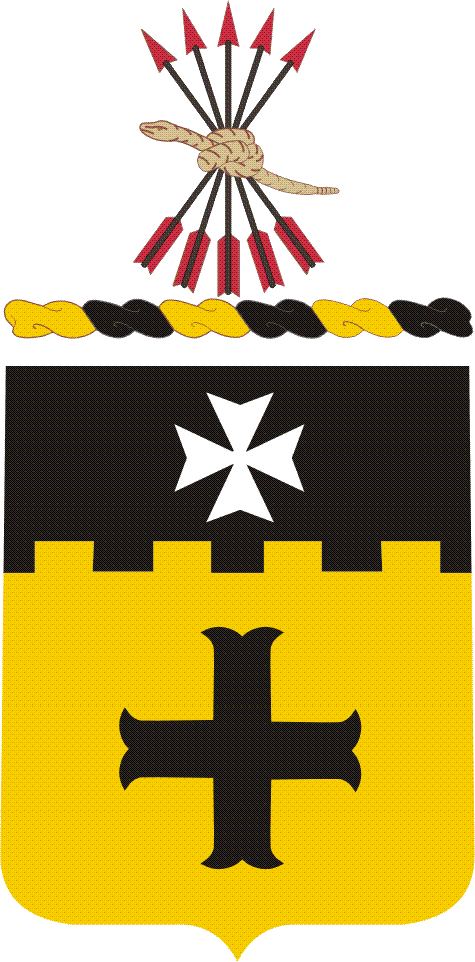
  - 5th Cavalry Regiment, Troop A
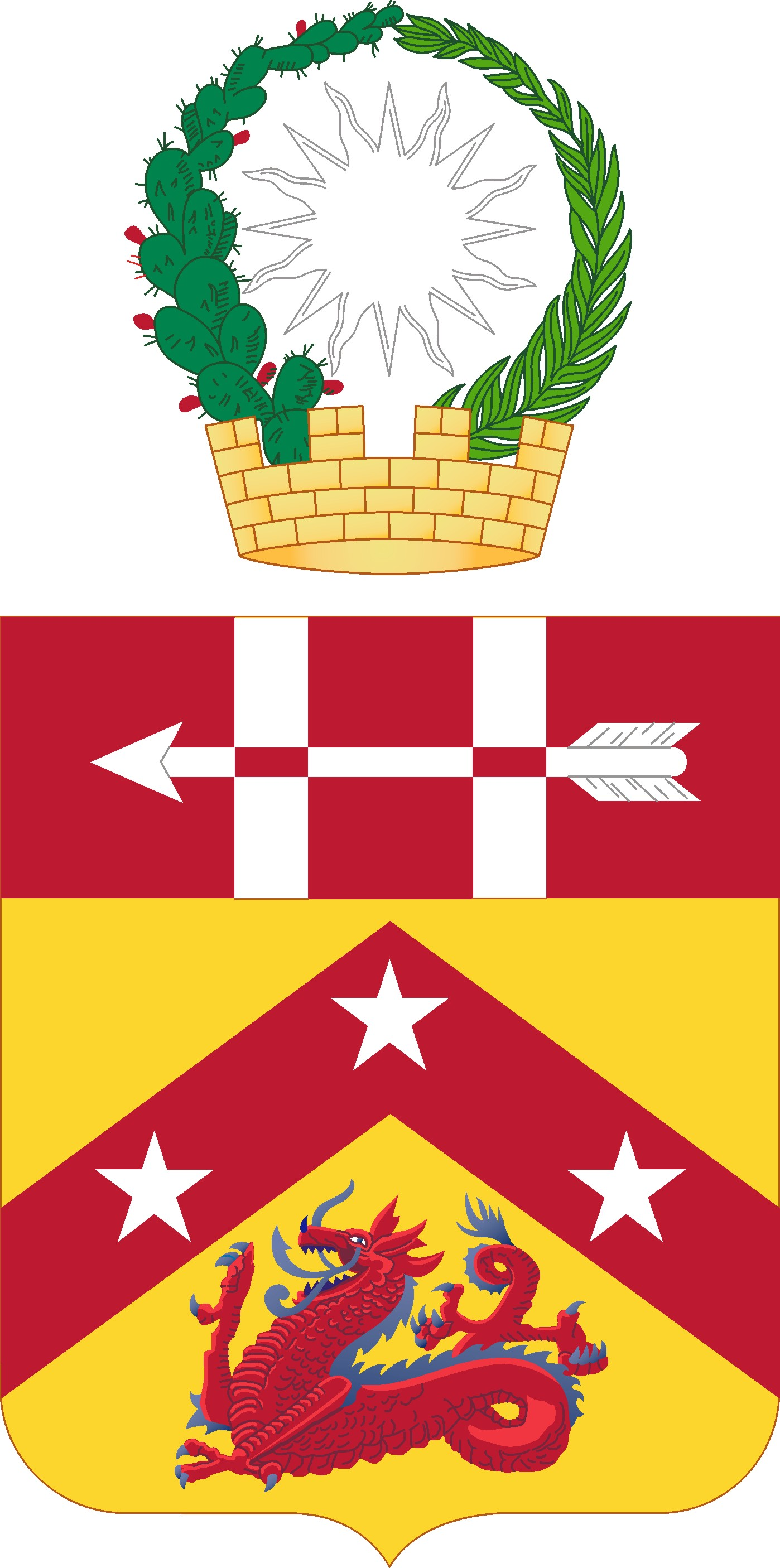
  - 3rd Artillery, Light Battery C
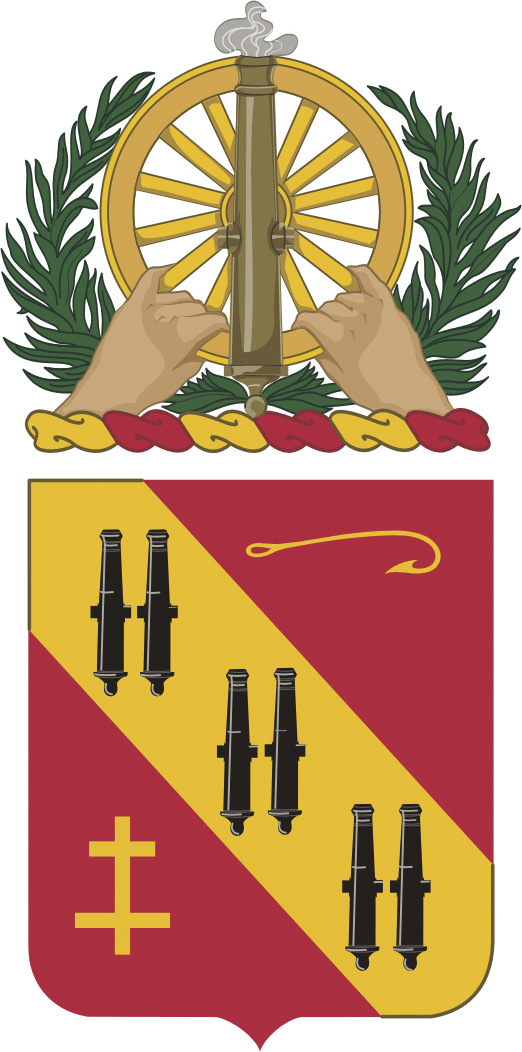
  - 5th Artillery, Light Battery D
- Additional troops assigned to the 1st Army Corps:
  - 3rd Illinois Volunteer Infantry Regiment
  - 4th Ohio Volunteer Infantry Regiment - Col. Alonzo Coit
  - 4th Pennsylvania Volunteer Infantry Regiment
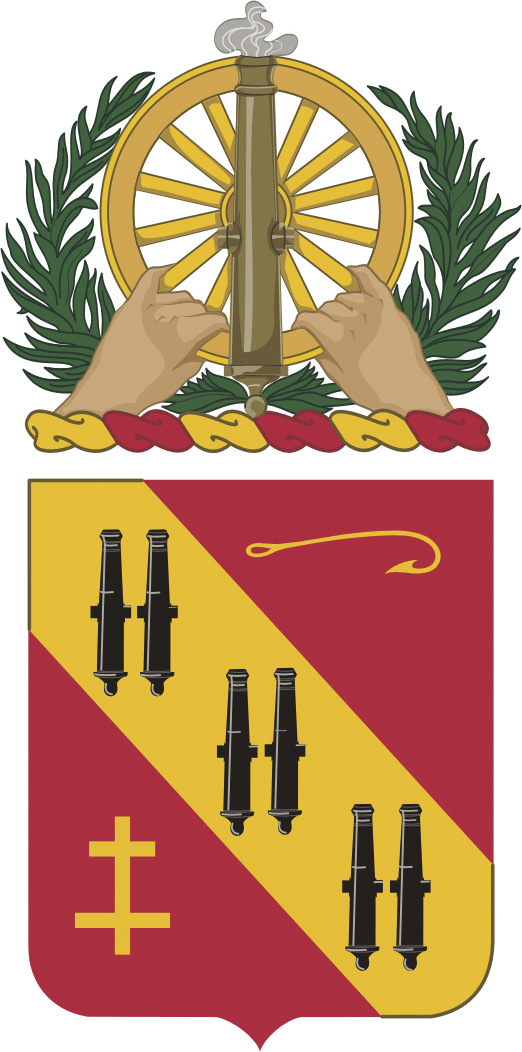
  - 5th Artillery, Battery G
  - 6th Cavalry Regiment, Troop H
  - 7th Artillery, Battery C - Col. William Sinclair
  - 7th Artillery, Battery M
  - 27th Battery, Indiana Volunteer Artillery
  - Illinois Volunteer Artillery, Battery A
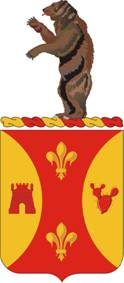
  - Missouri Volunteer Artillery, Battery A
  - Pennsylvania Cavalry Governor's Troop
  - Pennsylvania Volunteer Cavalry, First Troop Philadelphia City
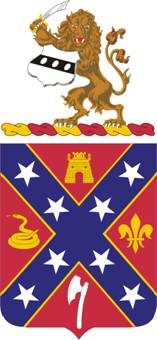
  - Pennsylvania Volunteer Artillery, Battery B Pittsburg
