= Royal T. Frank =

American Army general (1836–1908)

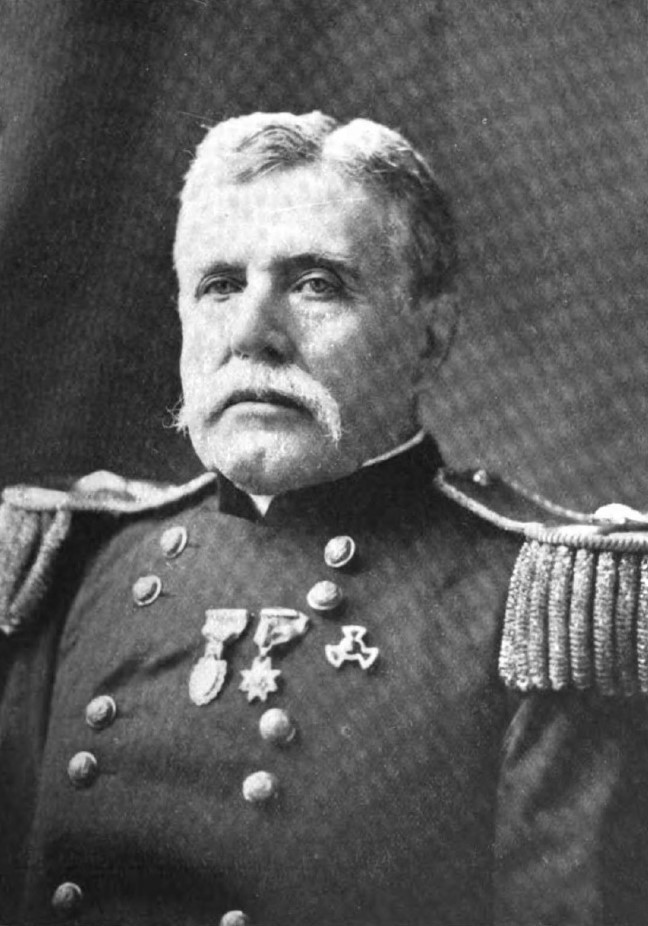
- Born: 6 May 1836; Gray, Maine, US
- Died: 14 March 1908 (aged 71); Washington, D.C., US
- Burial place: Arlington National Cemetery
- Military career
- Allegiance: United States
- Branch: United States Army
- Service years: 1858–1899
- Rank: Brigadier General
- Commands: Department of the Gulf; 1st Separate Brigade, 2nd Army Corps; 4th Army Corps (Acting); 2nd Division, 4th Army Corps; 3rd Army Corps (Acting); 1st Division, 3rd Army Corps; 1st Army Corps (Interim); Department of the East; 1st Artillery Regiment; U.S. Army Artillery School for Practice
- Conflicts: American Indian Wars; American Civil War; Spanish–American War

Royal Thaxter Frank (6 May 1836 – 14 March 1908) was an officer in the United States Army. He fought in the American Civil War and the Spanish–American War, retiring as a brigadier general after forty-one years of military service.

== Biography ==
Frank was born in Gray, Maine, the son of Alpheus Frank and Naomi Stimson. He was a descendant of Thomas and Anna Frank, who settled in Maine before 1727.

He entered the United States Military Academy in July 1854, graduating in July 1858. Frank was commissioned as a brevet second lieutenant in the 8th Infantry Regiment. He served at Newport Barracks, Kentucky and was promoted to second lieutenant in October 1858.

In 1859, his unit was sent to Fort Union, New Mexico. In July 1860, while commanding companies E and K at a supply depot on Hatch's Ranch near Santa Fe, Frank participated in a three-day skirmish with a band of Comanches. He successfully defended his position against a force estimated to be ten times larger than his own until reinforcements arrived. Later in 1860, his unit was transferred to Fort Fillmore, New Mexico. On 9 May 1861, while on a march from El Paso, Texas under the command of Captain Isaac V. D. Reeve, Frank was taken prisoner by Confederate soldiers near San Antonio. He remained a prisoner until 20 February 1862, when he was freed in a prisoner exchange. He was promoted to first lieutenant retroactive to 14 May 1861 and then promoted to captain on 27 February 1862.

Rejoining the 8th Infantry, Frank participated in the defense of Washington, D.C. and then in the Peninsula campaign. In July 1862, he was brevetted major for gallant and meritorious services during the campaign. Frank next participated in the Battles of Antietam and Fredericksburg. On 13 December 1862, he was brevetted lieutenant colonel for gallant and meritorious services during the latter battle.

Frank spent the remainder of the Civil War on garrison or recruiting duty. From June 1864 to March 1866, he served on the staff of Brigadier General Philip Cooke in New York City. On 12 October 1864, he married Emma Knight. They had a son and a daughter. After the war, Frank continued on garrison duty, serving primarily in the former Confederate states. In December 1870, he was transferred from the 8th Infantry to the 1st Artillery. In January 1881, he was promoted to major.

From July 1886 to November 1888, Frank was assigned to the Artillery School for Practice. From November 1888 to May 1898, he served as commandant of the Artillery School and Fort Monroe. In January 1889, Frank was promoted to lieutenant colonel in the 2nd Artillery. In October 1894, Frank was promoted to colonel and given additional command of the 1st Artillery Regiment.

In May 1898, Frank was promoted to brigadier general of volunteers and given command of the Department of the East. From 23 July to 2 August 1898, he served as interim commanding general of the 1st Army Corps. From August to October 1898, Frank served as commanding general of the 1st Division, 3rd Army Corps. From September to October 1898, he also served as acting commander of the 3rd Army Corps. From November 1898 to January 1899, Frank served as commanding general of the 2nd Division, 4th Army Corps and acting commander of the 4th Army Corps. From January to March 1899, he was commander of the 1st Separate Brigade, 2nd Army Corps.

From March to October 1899, Frank was commander of the Department of the Gulf. On 12 May 1899, he reverted to his permanent rank of colonel. On 17 October 1899, Frank was promoted to brigadier general in the regular army. He retired from active duty on the following day.

On 14 March 1908, Frank died at his home in Washington, D.C. He was buried in Section 1 of Arlington National Cemetery three days later.

== Memberships ==
General Frank was a companion of the Military Order of the Loyal Legion of the United States and was also a member of the Sons of the Revolution.

== Awards ==
- Civil War Campaign Medal
- Spanish War Service Medal

Note - Although General Frank met the requirements for the above awards, they were established after his retirement from the Army.

== Legacy ==
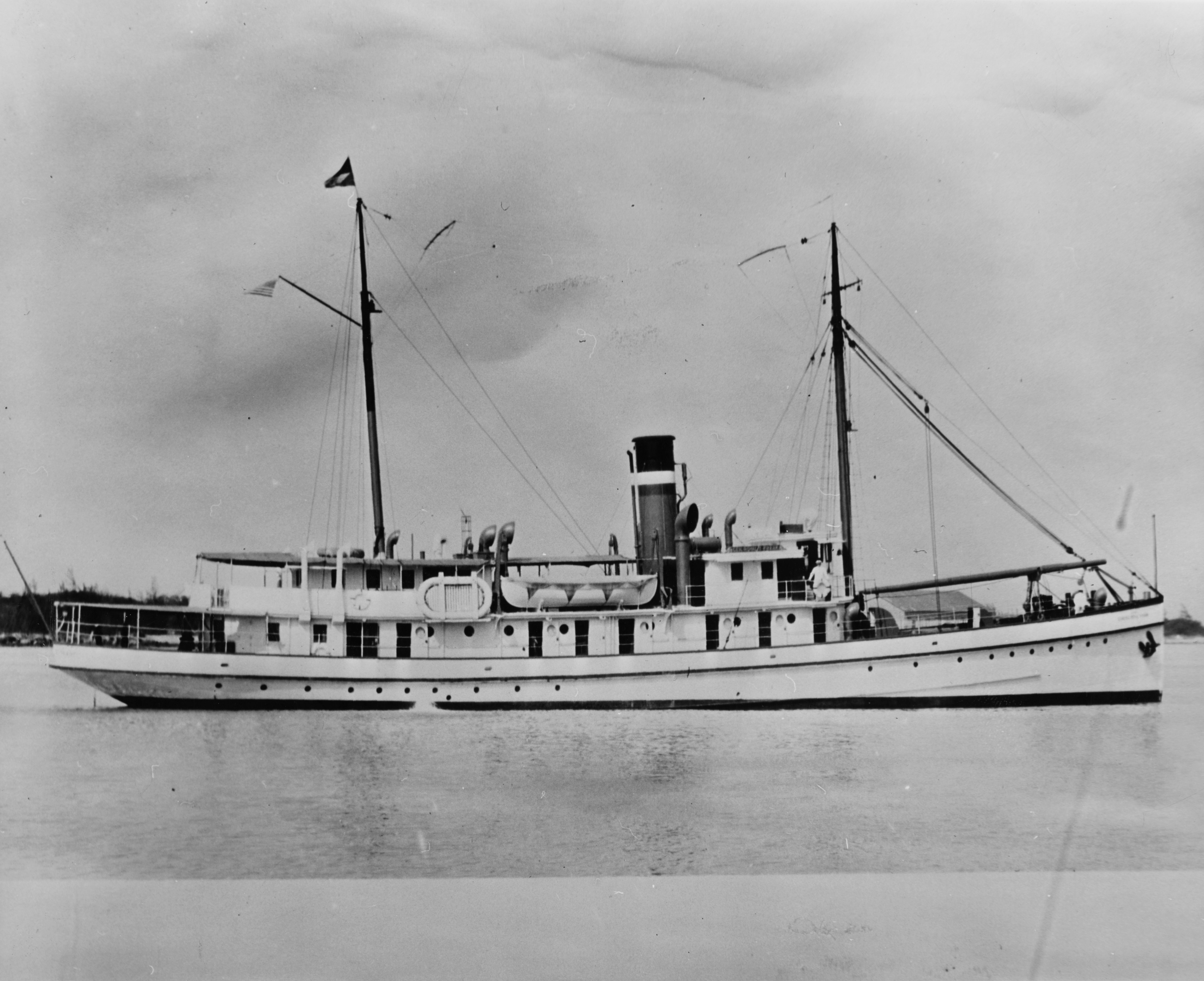
USAT General Royal T. Frank in 1931

Fort Frank in the Philippines was named in his honor. Two U.S. Army ships also bore his name. The USAT General Royal T. Frank was launched in 1909 and served as an inter-island transport in Hawaii. In January 1942, it was sunk by a torpedo from Japanese submarine I-171 while transporting Army recruits. The USAMP Brigadier General Royal T. Frank (MP-12) was launched in 1942 and served as a mine planter at Fort Miles on Delaware Bay until transferred to the U.S. Navy in 1944.
