= Third Army Corps (Spanish–American War) =

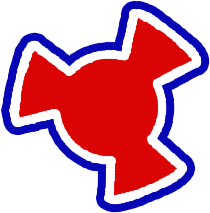
- Active: May 7 – October 7, 1898
- Country: United States of America
- Branch: Army of the United States
- Type: Corps
- Role: Infantry
- Size: 339 officers, 8,076 enlisted men (on 9/30/1898)
- Engagements: Spanish–American War

Commanders
- Notable commanders: Major General James F. Wade; Brigadier General Royal T. Frank, USV

Insignia
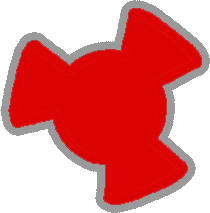
- Third Corps 1st Division

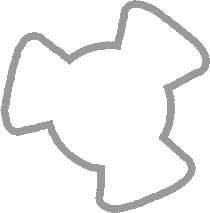
- Third Corps 2nd Division

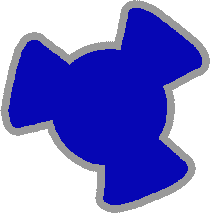
- Third Corps 3rd Division

The Third Army Corps was a unit of the United States Army raised for the Spanish–American War. After the declaration of war, General Order 36 of May 7, 1898 approved the organization of eight "army corps," each of which was to consist of three or more divisions of three brigades each.

Each brigade was to have approximately 3,600 officers and enlisted men organized into three regiments and, with three such brigades, each division was to total about 11,000 officers and men. Thus the division was to be about the same size as the division of 1861, but army corps were to be larger. The division staff initially was to have an adjutant general, quartermaster, commissary, surgeon, inspector general and engineer, with an ordnance officer added later. The brigade staff was identical except that no inspector general or ordnance officer was authorized.

General Order 46 of May 16, 1898 assigned commanding officers and training camps to the new corps. Major General James F. Wade was named as commander of Third Army Corps, which was to assemble at Camp Thomas, Georgia.

Brigadier General Royal T. Frank (USV) was assigned to command on September 4, and at the same time the corps was transferred to Anniston, Alabama, although a small detachment remained at Camp Thomas.

The corps was "discontinued" on October 7, 1898, many of its regiments having already mustered out.
