= USAMP General Royal T. Frank =

US Army mine planter

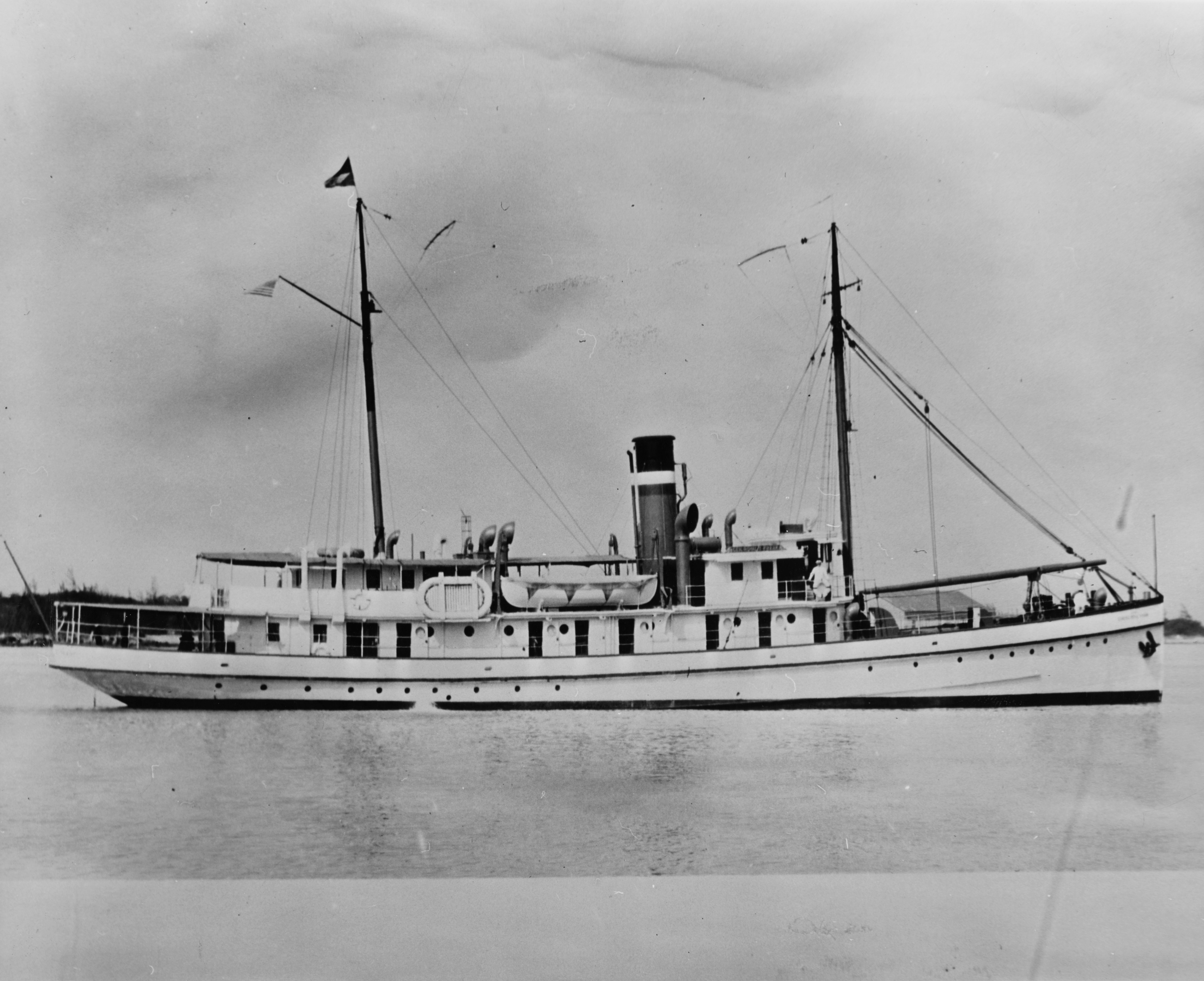
- USAT General Royal T. Frank in 1931

History

United States Army
- Name: USAMP General Royal T. Frank
- Builder: New York Shipbuilding Company
- Launched: 15 March 1909
- Acquired: 8 June 1909
- Recommissioned: 22 April 1929
- Decommissioned: 30 September 1922
- Fate: Sunk by Japanese submarine 28 January 1942 off Maui

General characteristics
- Displacement: 621 long tons (631 t)
- Length: 165 ft (50 m)
- Beam: 32 ft (9.8 m)
- Installed power: 2 steam engines, 900 horsepower each
- Propulsion: 2 propellers

USAMP General Royal T. Frank was a steel-hulled ship built for service in the U.S. Army as a mine planter. She was launched in March 1909. The ship served in the defense of the East and Gulf Coasts of the United States until she was decommissioned and put into reserve in 1922.

In 1929 the ship was reconfigured as an inter-island steamer, and recommissioned as USAT General Royal T. Frank. She carried a wide variety of Army passengers and cargoes on a regular route between Honolulu and Hilo, Hawaii until she was sunk by a Japanese submarine in January 1942.

== Construction and characteristics ==
The acquisition of the Philippines and Hawaii in 1898 led the U.S. Army Coast Artillery Corps to consider how to defend America's Pacific territories. Part of its response was to send four of its mine planters on the east coast of the United States to the Pacific in 1908. In February 1908, the Army Quartermaster Department, which was responsible for all shipbuilding for the Army, sought bids for a new mine planter to replace one of these ships in the Atlantic. When bids were opened in March they were found to be too high. New specifications sought new bids for up to four new mine planters. On 25 June 1908, the new bids were opened and New York Shipbuilding Company's was the lowest at $164,777 for each vessel. Contracts for three ships were awarded to the firm. These became USAMP General Samuel M. Mills (Contract 75), USAMP General John M. Schofield (Contract 76), and USAMP General Royal T. Frank (Contract 77). A contract for a fourth vessel was awarded to Pusey & Jones Company of Wilmington, Delaware. This became USAMP General E. O. C. Ord.

General Royal T. Frank was last of the three 1909 mine planters built by New York Shipbuilding at its Camden, New Jersey shipyard. Her keel was laid on 20 October 1908, and she was launched on 15 March 1909. Her sea trial was on 25 May 1909, and he was accepted by the Army on 8 June 1909.

The ship's hull and superstructure was built of steel plates riveted together. She was 165 ft (50 m) long overall with a beam of 32 feet (9.8 m). Her depth of hold was 17 feet (5.2 m) Her gross register tonnage was 590 and her net register tonnage was 401. Her displacement was 621 tons.

The ship had two 4-bladed propellers which were 7.5 feet (2.3 m) in diameter. They were driven by two compound, reciprocating steam engines, each of which generated 900 horsepower. The engines' high pressure cylinders were 16.5 inches in diameter, and their low pressure cylinders were 34 inches in diameter, with a stroke of 24 inches. Steam was provided by two coal-fired boilers. Her coal bunkers held 120 tons. During her sea trial this propulsion system drove the ship at 14.67 miles per hour.

By 1914 General Frank was equipped with a 1-kilowatt wireless telegraph station. She was assigned the call sign WYA. The ship also had submarine signal receiving equipment aboard.

The ship's namesake was Brigadier General Royal T. Frank, who had a 40-year army career including a term as commandant of the US Army's Artillery school at Fort Monroe. A second Army mine planter USAMP Brigadier General Royal T. Frank, built in 1943, was also named for the General.

== US Army service (1909–1942) ==
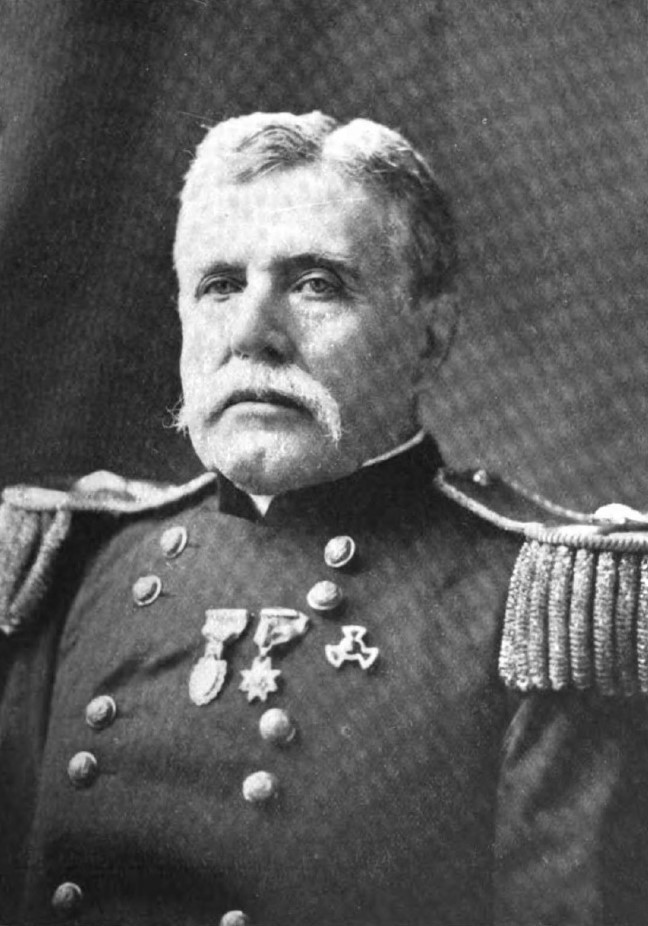
Brigadier General Royal T. Frank, the ship's namesake

=== Mine planter service (1909–1922) ===
The ship was assigned to the North Atlantic Coast Artillery District. As one of the few mine planters on the East and Gulf Coasts of the United States, she traveled widely to inspect, maintain, and train soldiers to use mine defenses. The brand-new USAMP General Royal T. Frank took Secretary of War Jacob M. Dickinson and Major General Leonard Wood aboard for a tour of coast defense posts in the northeast states ending in New York Harbor on 4 July 1909. During 1910, the ship sailed the east and Gulf coasts with Brigadier General Arthur Murray, Chief of Coast Artillery, aboard. Murray inspected a number of Coast Artillery posts on the East and Gulf Coasts. During her career as a mine planter, she visited ports as far north as Portland, Maine, as far south as Key West, and as far west as New Orleans.

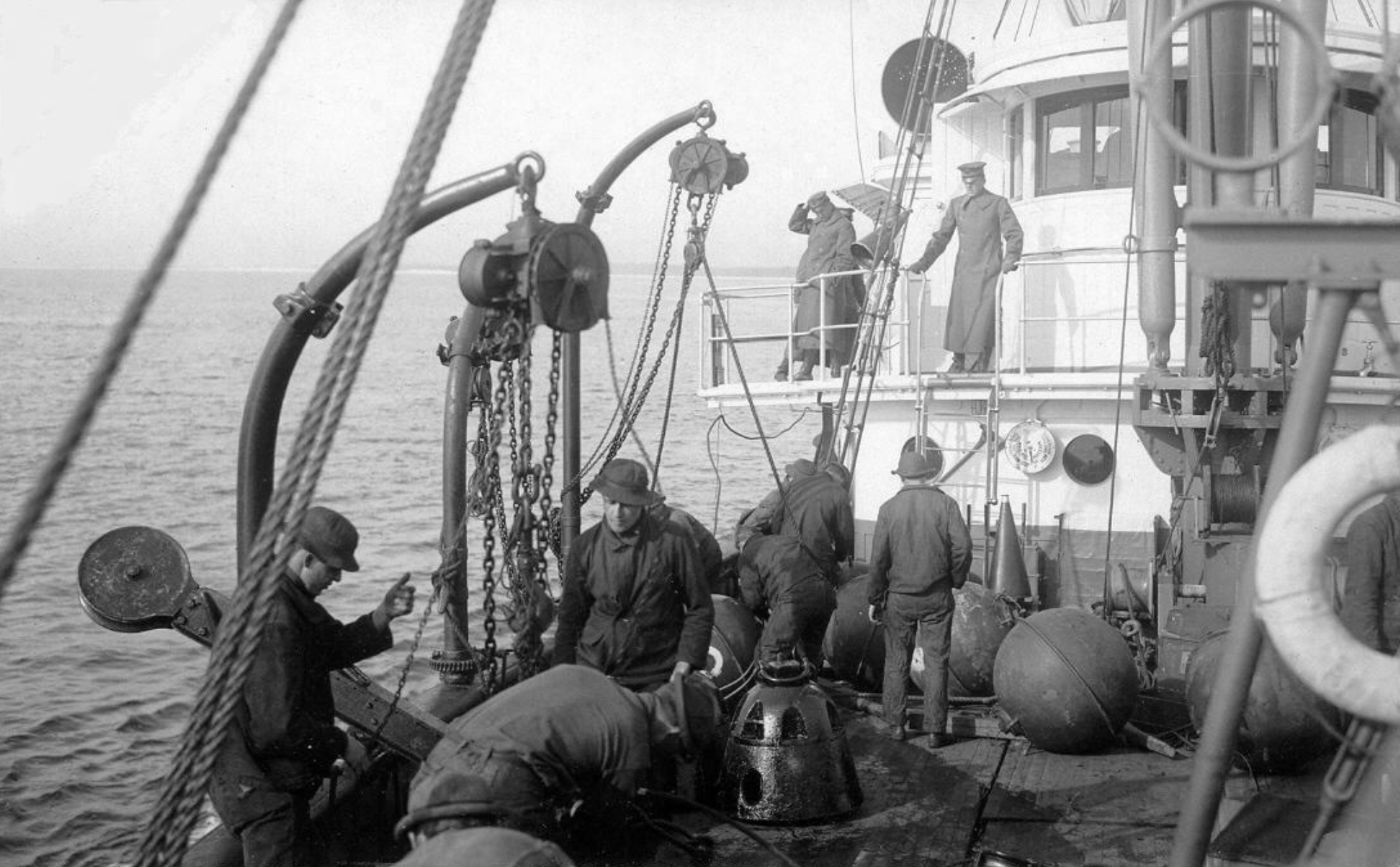
General Royal T. Frank conducting mine planting

General Frank ran aground near Plum Island, New York during training maneuvers in July 1909. While undergoing repairs, she suffered a fire in her hold on 3 August 1909. She was dry-docked in Jersey City for repairs. The ship was back in service by the end of August 1909.

The ship did a number of other jobs amidst its work as a mine planter. For example, on 6 January 1918 USAMP General Royal T. Frank assisted in dynamiting ice to restore navigation on the Fore River. In December 1918, after the armistice that ended World War I, General Frank removed the anti-submarine netting at Boston Harbor.

In the general demobilization after World War I there was a glut of all ship types. General Frank was decommissioned on 30 September 1922 and placed in reserve at the Richard T. Green Company shipyard in Chelsea, Massachusetts.

=== Transport service (1929–1942) ===
On 27 January 1929, General Royal T. Frank was towed to the Simpson Plant of Bethlehem Shipbuilding in Boston for alterations and maintenance for a new assignment. The work was reported to have cost about $60,000. Among the changes made was to convert her from coal-burning to oil-burning. After her shipyard visit, General Frank sailed for Fort Mason in San Francisco, and thence to Honolulu. She arrived in Hawaii on 7 June 1929.

General Royal T. Frank no longer maintained mine defenses for the Coastal Artillery Corps, but became an inter-island transport operated by the Quartermaster's Department. In this new role she carried a wide variety of cargoes and passengers among the Hawaiian Islands. She carried troops among Army bases, and to the Army's Kilauea Military Camp for rest and recreation. She brought the mail to Hilo. The ship transported regrigerated food.

==== Loss of General Royal T. Frank ====
In the aftermath of the Pearl Harbor attack, USAT General Royal T. Frank had a busy January 1942. She was at sea 18 of the first 26 days of the month sailing on her inter-island routes. At 0650 on 27 January 1942 General Frank left Honolulu bound for Hilo with a stops at Kaunakakai and Kahului. She had on board 26 Hawaii Army National Guard soldiers from the 299th Infantry Regiment fresh from boot camp at Schofield Barracks on Oahu who were on their way home. General Frank sailed in convoy with the cargo ship Kalae, which was towing a barge carrying heavy construction equipment, and with USS Trever which acted as an escort.

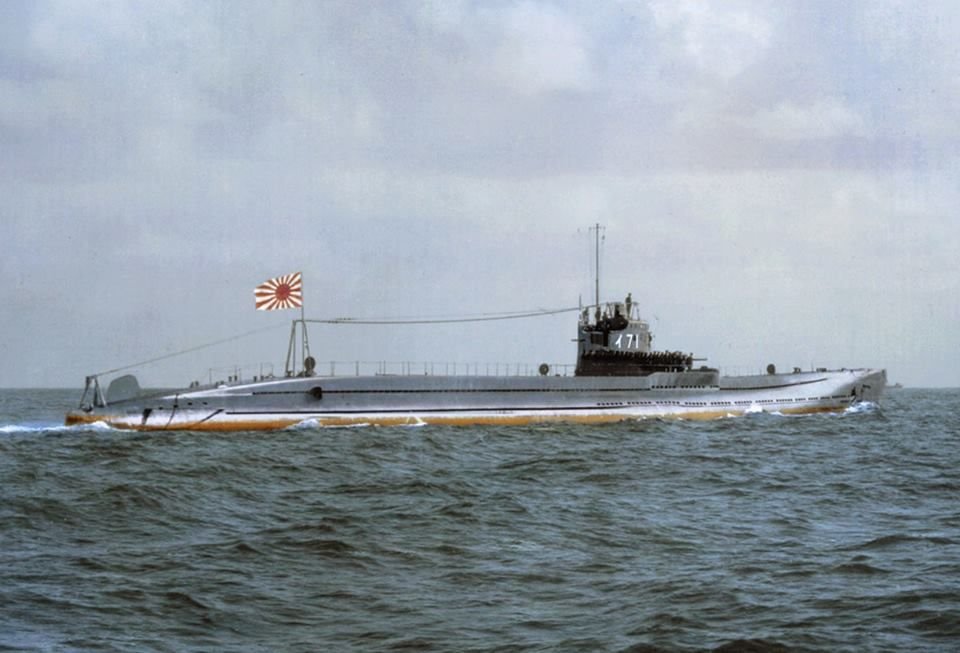
I-71 sank General Royal T. Frank on 28 January 1942

On 28 January 1942, the convoy encountered Japanese submarine I-71 which was on her second war patrol. The submarine fired two torpedoes which missed, and a third that hit General Frank on her starboard side. The explosion sank the ship in less than a minute. Nine of the 26 soldiers, and 24 of the 36 crew aboard survived. Nineteen civilian crew members of USAT General Royal T Frank were awarded the Merchant Marine Combat Bar with Silver Star. The ship's wheel was recovered during the rescue of her crew and is now at the Army Transportation Museum at Joint Base Langley-Eustis.

The torpedoing of General Frank was reported to have taken place at 20°36′N 155°42′W, about 30 miles north of Upolu Point, in the ʻAlenuihāhā Channel that separates the islands of Hawaii and Maui. The wreck has never been found. On 28 January 2026, a memorial to the soldiers lost on the torpedoed ship was unveiled at the Keaukaha Military Reservation in Hilo.
