= Theodore Schwan =

US Army Medal of Honor recipient (1841–1926)

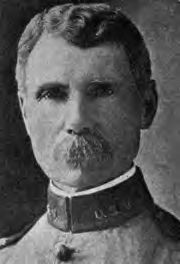
- Medal of Honor recipient
- Born: July 9, 1841; Bremerhaven, Germany
- Died: May 27, 1926 (aged 84); Washington, D.C., US
- Burial place: Arlington National Cemetery
- Military career
- Allegiance: United States of America; Union
- Branch: United States Army; Union Army
- Service years: 1857–1901
- Rank: Major General
- Units: 10th U.S. Infantry; 11th U.S. Infantry
- Conflicts: American Civil War: Battle of Peebles' Farm; Indian Wars: Red River War; Great Sioux War of 1876-77; Spanish–American War: Battle of Silva Heights; Philippine–American War
- Awards: Medal of Honor

Theodore Schwan (July 9, 1841 – May 27, 1926) was a Union Army officer during the American Civil War who received the Medal of Honor for his actions at the Battle of Peebles' Farm. He also served with distinction during the Spanish–American and Philippine–American Wars.

== Early life and Civil War ==
Theodore Schwan was the son of Rev. Georg Heinrich Christian Schwan and his second wife, Dorette Polemann, and the half-brother of Rev. Heinrich Christian Schwan. Schwan was born in Wulsdorf, now a neighborhood in the city of Bremerhaven, Bremen, Germany, but in 1841 part of the Kingdom of Hanover, and received his initial schooling in Germany. He immigrated to the United States in 1857, arriving at New York on 30 May 1857 on the sailing ship Ariel. On 12 June 1857, Schwan enlisted as a Private in the Regular Army, four weeks before his 16th birthday, and served in the 10th U.S. Infantry.

When the Civil War broke out, he served with his regiment, rising from Private to Quartermaster Sergeant by October 1863, when he was commissioned as a Second Lieutenant. He was promoted to First Lieutenant in April 1864 and later received the Medal of Honor for dragging a wounded Union officer to the rear and preventing him from being captured at the October 1864 Battle of Peebles Farm.

== After the war ==
He remained in the Regular Army after the close of the Civil War and was promoted to captain on March 14, 1866. From May 1866 to May 1867 he was commanding a company as chief quartermaster for the Quartermaster Department of the District of Minnesota at Fort Snelling, Minnesota. He was then on leave of absence from May to October, 1867; commanding a company at Fort Snelling, Minnesota to April, 1869; unassigned May, 1869; and then on duty at Galveston, Indianola, Corpus Christi, and Jefferson, Texas, until December 1869.

== Indian Wars ==
Captain Schwan was assigned to Eleventh U.S. Infantry regiment December, 1869; Commanding Company G, on frontier duty at Fort Griffin, and a subpost Fort Phantom Hill, Texas, 1870–73 (the intervening ten months having been spent on sick-leave of absence).

During the Red River War, 1874-76 he again was commanding Company G, at Fort Griffin. On February 5, 1874, detachments of Companies A and G, Eleventh Infantry, attacked a camp of hostile Qua ha dee Comanches on the Double Mountain Fork Brazos River, Texas, killed eleven Indians and captured sixty-five horses. One enlisted man was wounded in the fight.

In August and September, 1876, He was sent with the Eleventh Infantry from the Department of Texas to the Department of Dakota for field service in connection with the Great Sioux War of 1876-77 in the Dakota Territory and in Montana. Captain Schwan served at Cheyenne River Agency, D.T., Fort Custer, M.T., Fort Bennett, D.T., and Fort Sully, D.T., 1876–80.

On May 16, 1877, Lt. Gen. Sheridan directed his brother Lt. Col. Michael V. Sheridan to retrieve the bodies of Custer and his officers. On June 20, 1877, About 7 o'clock Company I, Seventh Cavalry (Captain Nowlan), reached the north bank of the Yellowstone, having been detached as the escort of Colonel Sheridan, who was to proceed to the Little Bighorn for the purpose of securing the bodies of the officers who fell in the Custer fight. Later in the day Colonel Sheridan passed up the river on the steamer Fletcher, being accompanied by Captain Schwan, Company G, Eleventh Infantry.

Headquarters of the Military District of Dakota Territory, March 15, 1878, designated Capt. Theodore Schwan to act as Indian agent at the Cheyenne Agency, Dakota Territory. On June 20, the commissioner of Indian Affaires instructed Captain Schwan to form an Indian police force on the Cheyenne River Agency in order to reduce the need of a military force at the agency.

He was then on recruiting service at Davids Island N.Y. Harbor 1880–82. Captain Schwan was an instructor on the staff of the United States School of Application for Cavalry and Infantry, at Fort Leavenworth, Kan., 1882–86.

== Adjutant-General's Department ==
Captain Theodore Schwan, of the 11th Infantry, to be assistant adjutant general with the rank of major, July 6, 1886, vice Benjamin, deceased.

Maj. (now Lieut. Col.) Theodore Schwan, assistant adjutant-general, detailed as acting inspector-general, Department of Dakota, July 17, 1894, per Special Orders, No. 140, Adjutaut-General's Office, 1894; relieved April 30, 1895, per Special Orders, No. 75, Adjutant-General's Office, current series (lieutenant colonel and assistant adjutant general, February 19, 1895).

He was promoted to colonel and assistant adjutant-general, May 18, 1898. The Adjutant-General's Department was then Adjt.-Gen'l, Brig.-Gen. H. C. Corbin. Assistants, Col. Theodore Schwan, Col. Thos. Ward, Lieut.-Col. W. H. Carter, Maj. H. O. S. Heistand, Maj. J. A. Johnston and Maj. W. A. Simpson.

Two weeks before his last promotion in the regular army he was appointed brigadier-general of volunteers, and in accordance with the Act of Congress, approved March 2, 1899, he will retain that rank until July 1, 1901. He was brevetted several times.

== Spanish–American War ==
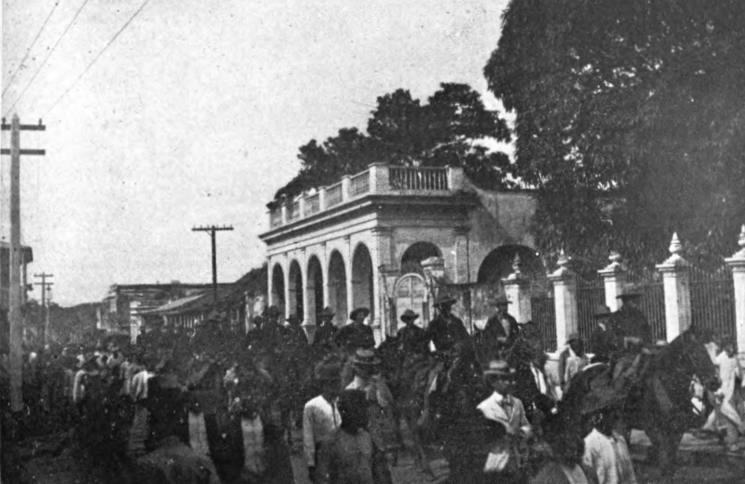
American Cavalry entering Mayagüez on the 11th of August 1898

When the Spanish–American War erupted, Lt. Col. Schwan was appointed brigadier general of volunteers and colonel in the Regular Army in May 1898, making him one of the only foreign-born generals in the Spanish–American War. He assumed command of the First Division of the Fourth Army Corps, which had mustered in at Mobile, Alabama before moving to the Tampa assembly area in early June and Miami, Florida on June 20. That unit was exchanged with the First Division, Seventh Army Corps on June 27, and at the beginning of July, Schwan was relieved of that command by the War Department, freeing him for service with the Puerto Rican invasion.

Schwan assumed command of the Independent Regular Brigade and sailed for Puerto Rico; the brigade landed at Guánica on July 31 and moved west along the coast. On August 10, his brigade won the Battle of Silva Heights; the next day, he entered the town of Mayagüez, Puerto Rico. The Spanish moved up for another attack on Schwan, but a cease fire was enacted before either side attacked. Allegedly during this cease fire, Schwan's troops engaged in the first game of baseball to be played in Puerto Rico.

== Philippine–American War ==
With the fighting on Puerto Rico over, General Schwan was transferred to the Philippines, where he became chief-of-staff of the Eighth Army Corps, which had become engaged in the Philippine–American War. He personally directed the first Cavite Expedition, then took command of the Second Brigade in the corps' First Division (in this era, brigade and division numbers were repeated from one corps to another) during the second Cavite Expedition.

== Retirement and death ==
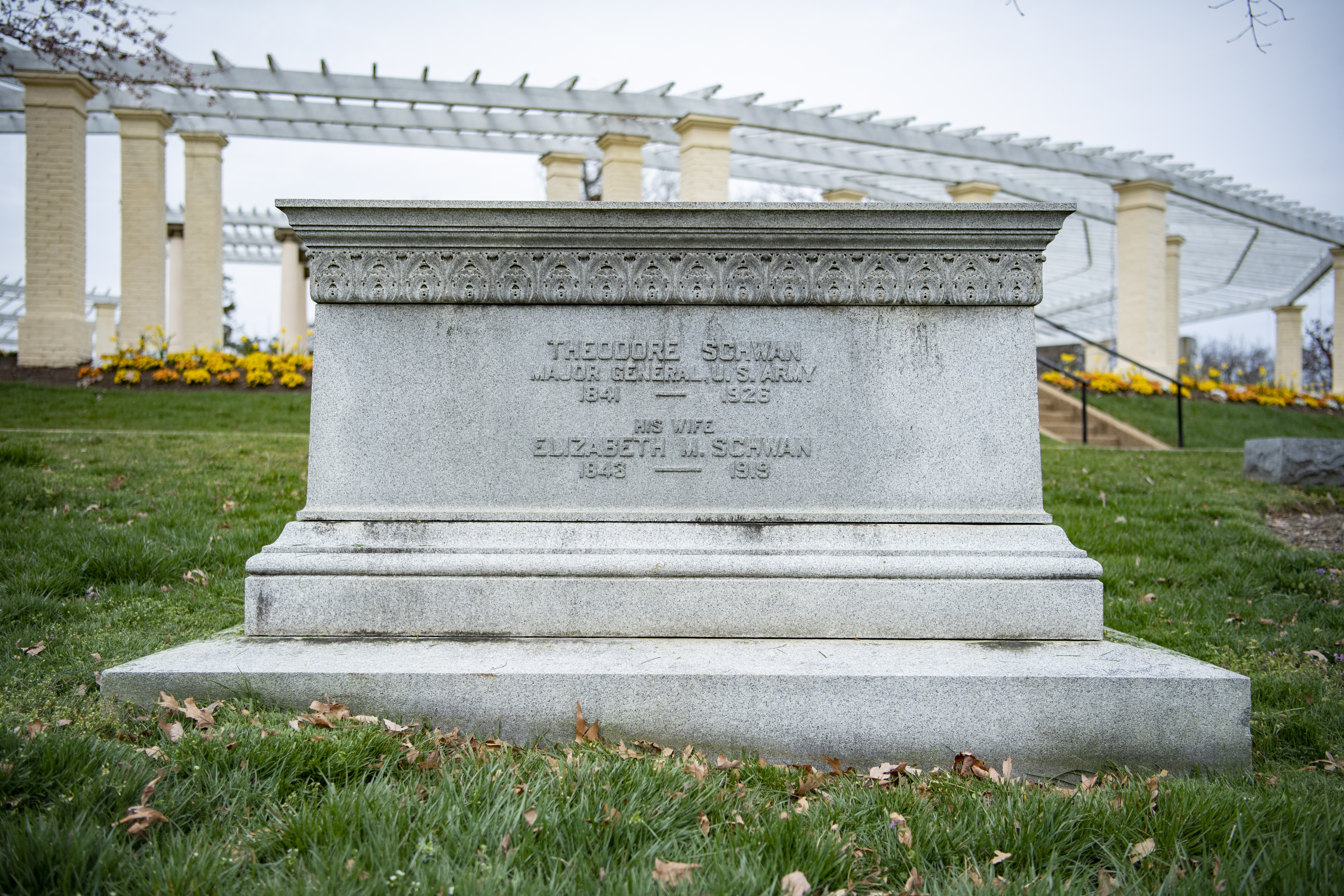
Grave at Arlington National Cemetery

He retired from the army in 1901 and was made a Major General of Regulars and put on the retired list. Theodore Schwan died in 1926 and was buried in Arlington National Cemetery.

== Medal of Honor citation ==

Rank and Organization:

First Lieutenant, 10th U.S. Infantry. Place and date: At Peebles Farm, Va., October 1, 1864. Entered service at: New York. Born: July 9, 1841, Germany. Date of issue: December 12, 1898.

Citation:

At the imminent risk of his own life, while his regiment was falling back before a superior force of the enemy, he dragged a wounded and helpless officer to the rear, thus saving him from death or capture.

== See also ==
- List of Medal of Honor recipients
- List of American Civil War Medal of Honor recipients: Q–S
- Puerto Rican Campaign

== Bibliography ==
- "Arlington National Cemetery".
- Herrman, Karl Stephen. From Yauco to Las Marias.
