= New Zealand Army Logistic Specialist =

Logistic Specialist (Log Spec) is the Royal New Zealand Army Logistic Regiment trade responsible for providing Supply & Quartermaster support to the New Zealand Army within New Zealand or overseas.

== History ==
The New Zealand Logistic Specialist Trade can trace its lineage to 30 October 1840 with the appointment of Henry Tucker as the First Colonial Storekeeper of the Colony of New Zealand. For the years leading to 1911 the provision of Supply and Quartermaster support to the New Zealand Forces would be provided by a combination of the Civil Branch of the New Zealand Defence Forces, the Defence Stores Department and Regimental Quartermasters appointed from within the ranks of the various New Zealand military units. As the Defence Forces of New Zealand transitioned to the Territorial Army system in the early twentieth century, a more modern and responsive supply and quartermaster system was required to ensure the ongoing care, maintenance and responsibility of military equipment. In November 1911 thirty young men were selected from across the various New Zealand Military Districts and undertook three weeks specialist Quartermaster Training at the Defence Stores Department in Wellington. Undergoing practical and theoretical instruction in the duties of the office of Regimental Quartermaster Sergeant, the course provided instruction on;

- Weapon storage, inspection, maintenance and accounting,
- The storage, inspection and maintenance of leather items such as horse saddlery and harnesses.
- The correct methods of storage, inspection and maintenance of canvas and fabric items such as tents, other camp canvas and fabric camp equipment.
- Instruction on the packing of stores.
- Instruction on ledger-keeping and the maintenance of stores accounting documentation.

Examinations were held with records showing that at least 18 of the 30 candidates passed the exams successfully and were appointed as Regimental Quartermaster Sergeants in the New Zealand Permanent Staff under General Order 112/10.

As the First World War came to a close it was found that the accounting, care, and custody of stores by New Zealand-based units had been unsatisfactory with Regimental Quartermaster Sergeants and their Staff not carrying out their responsibilities in accordance with New Zealand Military Forces Regulations. As an emergency measure Eleven NZAOC Staff Sergeants were seconded to units to act as Quartermaster-Sergeants with units in an attempt to rectify the situation. This surge of NZAOC personnel was a success with further audits disclosing few if any deficiencies. To rectify the situation and prevent a re-occurrence, an amendment to Army regulations was published on 3 October 1918 to make the management of Quartermaster Sergeants a NZAOC responsibility.

The financial constraints of the interwar years saw that the management of Quartermaster Sergeants as an NZAOC responsibility never followed through in its entirety and the Supply system of the New Zealand Army evolved into two systems, one under the control of the New Zealand Army Ordnance Corps providing 2nd to 4th line (Wholesale) support with Unit Quartermaster Stores providing 1st Line (retail) support.

As a consequence of the 1993 re-balancing of the New Zealand Army, training of the RNZAOC Supplier trade, RNZAOC Auto Parts Trade and the All Arms Store-man trade was combined in 1994. Both streams formally combined on 5 December 1996 as the Supply-Quartermaster Trade of the Royal New Zealand Army Logistic Regiment (RNZALR). The Supply-Quartermaster Trade was the re-branded as the Supply Technician Trade in October 2007.

From 1 May 2023, the RNZALR Supply Technician trade officially changed its name to Logistics Specialist (Log Spec) after receiving approval from the Chief of Army. The decision to change the name was made following consultation with trade members in March 2020, who believed that a new name would improve the trade's recruitment profile, align it with civilian sector counterparts, and keep it relevant for current trade membership.

== Trade description ==
Logistics Specialist are tasked with ensuring that all of the supplies and services necessary for New Zealand Army operations are available at the right place at the right time. The Logistics Specialist Trade is a multidisciplinary trade providing integral and close support to Army and Joint Force units with a variety of items such as food, fuel, vehicles, spare parts, stationery, clothing and field services.

The principal responsibilities of New Zealand Army Logistics Specialist are:

- General Supply
- Supply of Fuel Oil and Lubricants
- Field services, including
  - Field Shower
  - laundry
  - Tyre Repair
  - Mortuary Affairs

New Zealand Army Logistics Specialist can be found serving in all units of the New Zealand Army and Joint Forces in diverse international locations, including combat zones at forward operating bases in diverse locations such as East Timor, Iraq or Afghanistan.

== Training ==
New Zealand Army Logistics Specialist are primarily trained at the Supply Wing of Trade Training School at Trentham Camp. The Supply Wing conducts core and non-core Supply Trade courses.

=== Core Courses ===
- Logistics Specialist RNZALR Junior Course
- Logistics Specialist RNZALR Intermediate Course
- Logistics Specialist RNZALR Senior Course
- Logistics Specialist RNZALR Supply Managers Course

=== Non Core Courses ===
- Logistics Specialist Ration Management Course
- Logistics Specialist Petroleum Operators Course
- Logistics Specialist Petroleum Managers Course
- Accounting Officers All Corps Course
- Tyre Repair Course
- Mortuary Operations Course

== Trade Badge ==
During 2009 a distinct Logistics Specialist badge was approved for wear by any Non-Commissioned Officer, Warrant Officer or Officer who had qualified on the Logistics Specialist Supply Management Course. The badge consists of a Taiaha and Brass key diagonally crossed, with the four stars of the Southern Cross between each point.

== Comparative trades in other New Zealand Armed Services ==
The Royal New Zealand Navy (RNZN) and Royal New Zealand Air Force(RNZAF) Equivalent roles are;

- RNZN – Logistic Supply Specialist
- RNZAF – Logistic Specialist

== Comparative trades in other Armed Forces ==
The NZ Army Logistics Specialist trade is similar to the following trades in other Armed Forces;

- Royal Logistic Corps
  - Logistic Supply Specialist
  - Petroleum Operator
- Royal Australian Army Ordnance Corps
  - Supply Coordinator
  - Petroleum Technician
- Royal Canadian Logistics Service
  - Materiel Management Technician
- United States Army Quartermaster Corps
  - MOS 92A Automated Logistical Specialist
  - MOS 92F Petroleum & Supply Specialist
  - MOS 92L Petroleum Laboratory Specialist
  - MOS 92M Mortuary Affairs Specialist
  - MOS 92S Shower/Laundry and Clothing Repair Specialist
  - MOS 92Y Unit Supply Specialist
  - MOS 92Z Senior Non-commissioned Logistician
- United States Marine Corps
  - MOS 1390 Bulk Fuel Officer,
  - MOS 1391 Bulk Fuel Specialist,
  - MOS 3534 Semitrailer Refueler Operator
  - MOS 3000 Basic Supply Administration and Operations Marine
  - MOS 3043 Supply Chain and Materiel Management Specialist
  - MOS 3044 Contract Specialist
  - MOS 3051 Warehouse Clerk
  - MOS 3052 Packaging Specialist
