= Fort Saratoga =

- Part of the Civil War defenses of Washington, D.C.
- Washington, D.C.
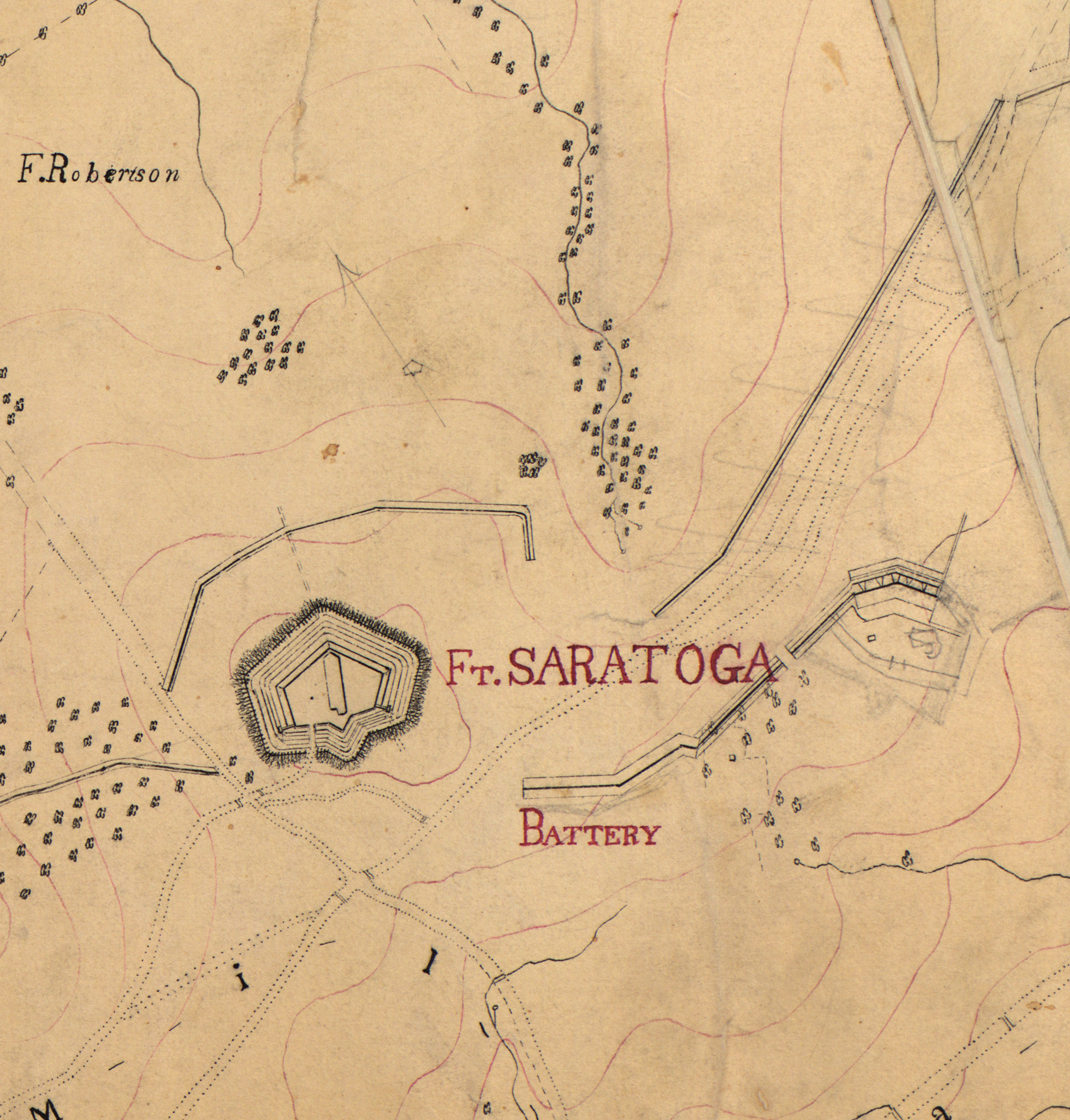
- Fort Saratoga on a map of 1863

Site information
- Type: Earthwork fort
- Controlled by: Union Army
- Condition: Residential Area

Location
- Coordinates: 38°55′47.3″N 76°58′43.3″W

Site history
- Built: 1861
- In use: 1865
- Materials: Earth and timber
- Battles/wars: American Civil War

Fort Saratoga was one of seven temporary earthwork forts of the Civil War Defenses of Washington, D.C. built in the Northeast quadrant of the city at the beginning of the Civil War by the Union Army to protect the city from the Confederate Army. From west to east, the forts were as follows: Fort Slocum, Fort Totten, Fort Slemmer, Fort Bunker Hill, Fort Saratoga, Fort Thayer and Fort Lincoln. Unlike other forts, nothing remains of the structure.

== Civil War ==
Fort Saratoga was an earthwork fort part of the Civil War Defenses of Washington, D.C. It was located 2 1/2 miles from the city at time, between Fort Bunker Hill and Fort Thayer on the north side of Brentwood Road (now Rhode Island Avenue), east of it crossing Queen's Chapel Road. It was established in August 1861 and built in part by the 112th Pennsylvania Regiment. The fort was 186 feet above mean tide level.

It had room for eight guns with a perimeter of 154 yards. The fort had the following armament:

- Six 32-pounder smoothbore canon (barbette)
- One 42-pounder James gun
- One 24-pounder Coehorn mortar

South of the fort, on the opposite side of the road was Battery Morris.

The following troops were garrisoned at the fort at some point during the Civil War:

- 112th Regiment Pennsylvania - 2nd Heavy Artillery
- 1st District of Columbia Infantry Regiment
- 12th Veteran Reserve Regiment
- 150th Ohio National Guard
- 2nd Company, New Hampshire Heavy Artillery

== Post Civil War ==
With the end of the Civil War, the fort was abandoned in 1865.

The field went back to private ownership and in 1902 it was owned by a Mrs. Walsh and used as a cultivated field. Today, it is a residential area with no sign of the fort.

== See also ==
- Civil War Defenses of Washington
- Washington, D.C., in the American Civil War
- Fort Slocum
- Fort Totten
- Fort Slemmer
- Fort Bunker Hill
- Fort Thayer
- Fort Lincoln
- Battle of Fort Stevens
