= Fort Thayer =

- Part of the Civil War defenses of Washington, D.C.
- Washington, D.C.
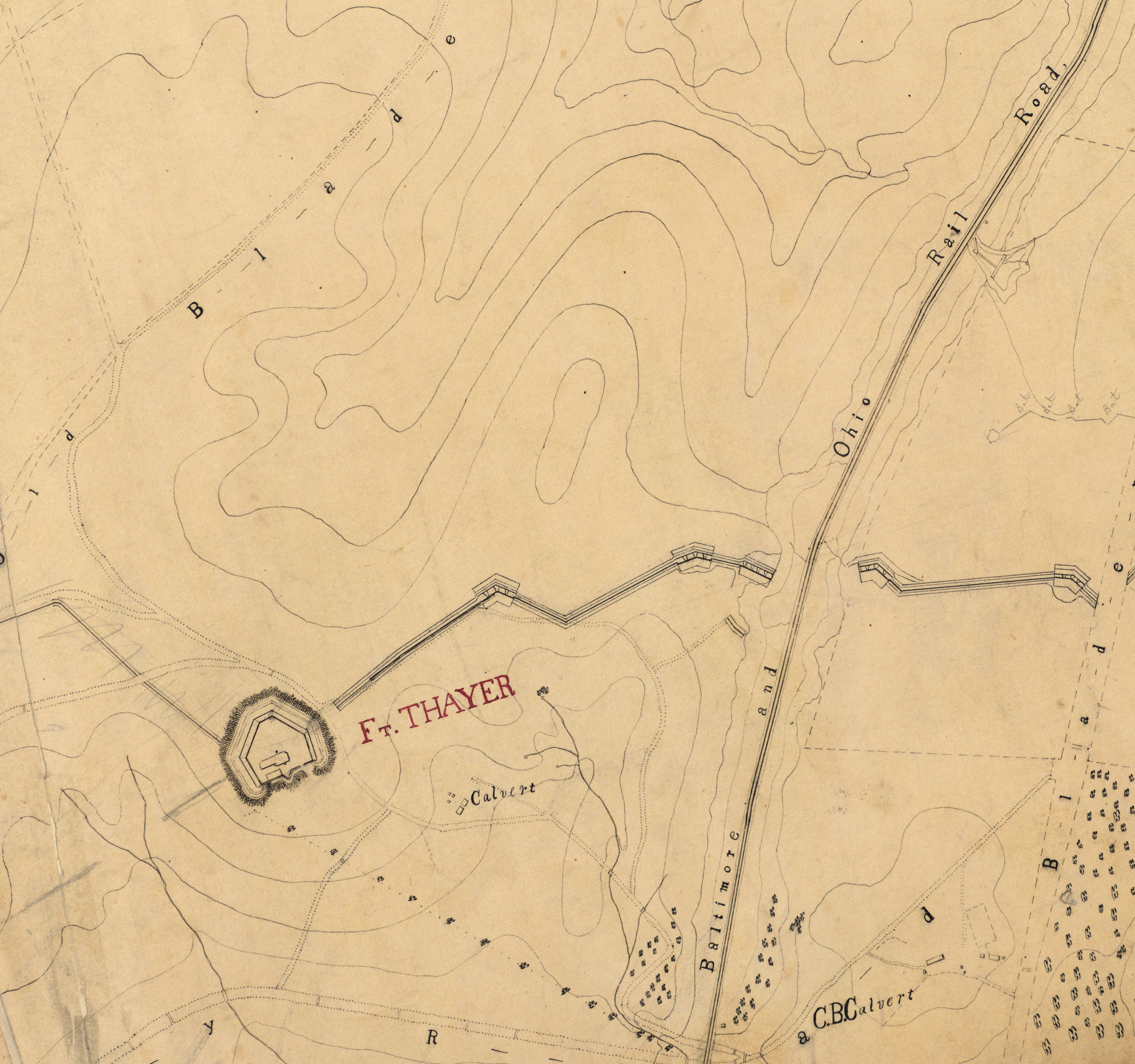
- Fort Thayer on a map of 1863

Site information
- Type: Earthwork fort
- Controlled by: Union Army
- Condition: Residential Area

Location
- Coordinates: 38°55′43.81″N 76°58′18.03″W

Site history
- Built: 1861
- In use: 1861–1865
- Materials: Earth and timber
- Demolished: 1865
- Battles/wars: American Civil War

Fort Thayer was one of seven temporary earthwork forts of the Civil War Defenses of Washington, D.C., built in the Northeast quadrant of the city at the beginning of the Civil War by the Union Army to protect the city from the Confederate Army. From west to east, the forts were as follows: Fort Slocum, Fort Totten, Fort Slemmer, Fort Bunker Hill, Fort Saratoga, Fort Thayer and Fort Lincoln. Unlike other forts, today nothing remains of the structure.

== Civil War ==
Fort Thayer was an earthwork fort set up by the Union Army in 1861 as part of the Civil War Defenses of Washington, DC. It was located between Fort Saratoga and Fort Lincoln. As Fort Saratoga, it was a minor work forming connecting links between Fort Bunker Hill and Fort Lincoln. It was a lunette with faces of 100 feet and stockaded gorges. It was designed to primarily defend the open ravine on the west as it could have offered enough cover and convenient approach to the enemy. It was recommended that "a platform for a siege gun should be made on the pan-coupe and platforms for field guns on the flanks, and merlons raised on faces [and that] a ditch should be made along the stockade of the gorge".

It was named after Colonel Sylvanus Thayer known as the "Father of West Point" who was at the time the chief engineer for the Boston area in the Army corps of engineers. It was built on privately owned land managed by Charles B. Calvert.

The fort was equipped with:

- Two 8-inch siege howitzers
- One 24-pounder James gun
- Four 24-pounder seacoast guns
- One 24-pounder Coehorn mortar

The following troops were garrisoned at one point in Fort Thayer:

- 16th Regiment Massachusetts Volunteer Infantry
- 1st New Hampshire Heavy Artillery Volunteer Regiment
- 150th Ohio National Guard

== Post Civil War ==
In 1865, the fort was abandoned with the end of the Civil War.

In 1906, 34 residents and businesses championed a bill to preserve the fort as a public park with the support of the Washington Park Commission. It was noted that there were no parks in the area at the time and that development was under way in the vicinity. The owners at the time, Henry Vieth and Glenn E. Husted wrote in a letter that they would be more than happy to sell to the city it for a reasonable price of 10 cents per square foot if done quickly. Otherwise, they would grade it and sell it for building lots. Congress failed to act and the Commission resubmitted a bill in 1908 with the price going up to 12 cents. The Committee on Public Buildings and Grounds returned an adverse report and the fort was removed shortly after. Today, no building or marker remains.

== See also ==
- Civil War Defenses of Washington
- Washington, D.C., in the American Civil War
- Fort Slocum
- Fort Totten
- Fort Slemmer
- Fort Bunker Hill
- Fort Saratoga
- Fort Lincoln
- Battle of Fort Stevens
