= Fort Lincoln =

Fort Lincoln may refer to:

- Fort Abraham Lincoln, an old military post near Mandan, North Dakota, now a state park
- Fort Lincoln Internment Camp, former military post and internment camp near Bismarck
- Fort Lincoln (Kansas)
- Fort Lincoln (Texas), former federal frontier defense post in Texas
- Fort Lincoln (Washington, D.C.), a neighborhood of Northeast Washington, D.C.
- Fort Lincoln (District of Columbia), a Civil War fort in Northeast Washington, D.C.
