= Fort Slocum (Washington, D.C.) =

- Part of the Civil War defenses of Washington, D.C.
- Manor Park, Washington, D.C.
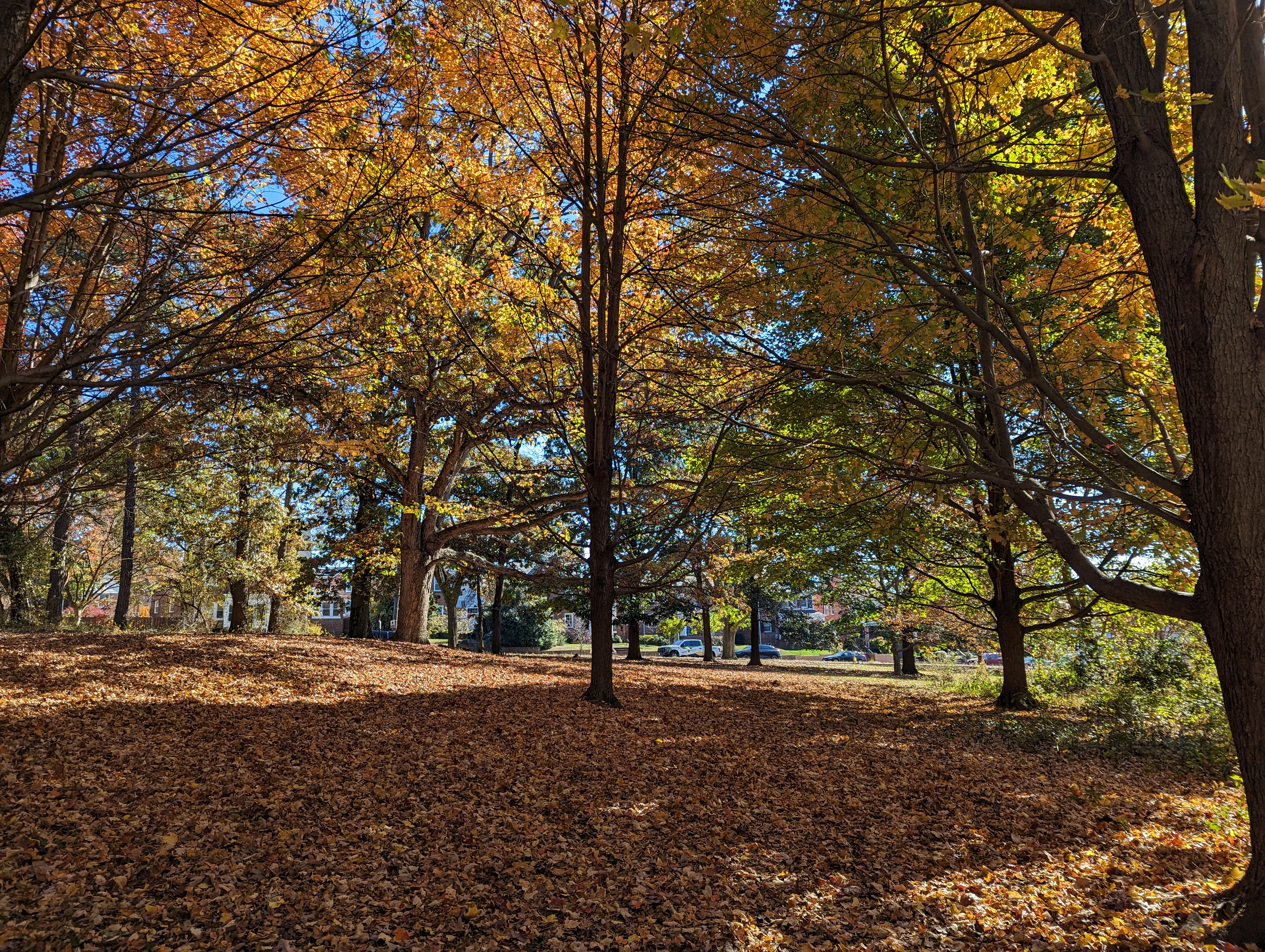
- A view of the woods at the park, November 2023

Site information
- Type: Earthwork fort
- Controlled by: Union Army
- Condition: Residential Area

Location
- Coordinates: 38°57′36.7″N 77°00′38.9″W

Site history
- Built: 1861
- Built by: 2nd Rhode Island Infantry
- In use: 1861–1865
- Materials: Earth and timber
- Demolished: 1865
- Battles/wars: American Civil War

Fort Slocum was one of seven temporary earthwork forts of the Civil War Defenses of Washington, D.C., built in the Northeast quadrant of the city after the beginning of the war by the Union Army to protect the city from the Confederate Army. From west to east, the forts were as follows: Fort Slocum, Fort Totten, Fort Slemmer, Fort Bunker Hill, Fort Saratoga, Fort Thayer and Fort Lincoln.

== Civil War ==
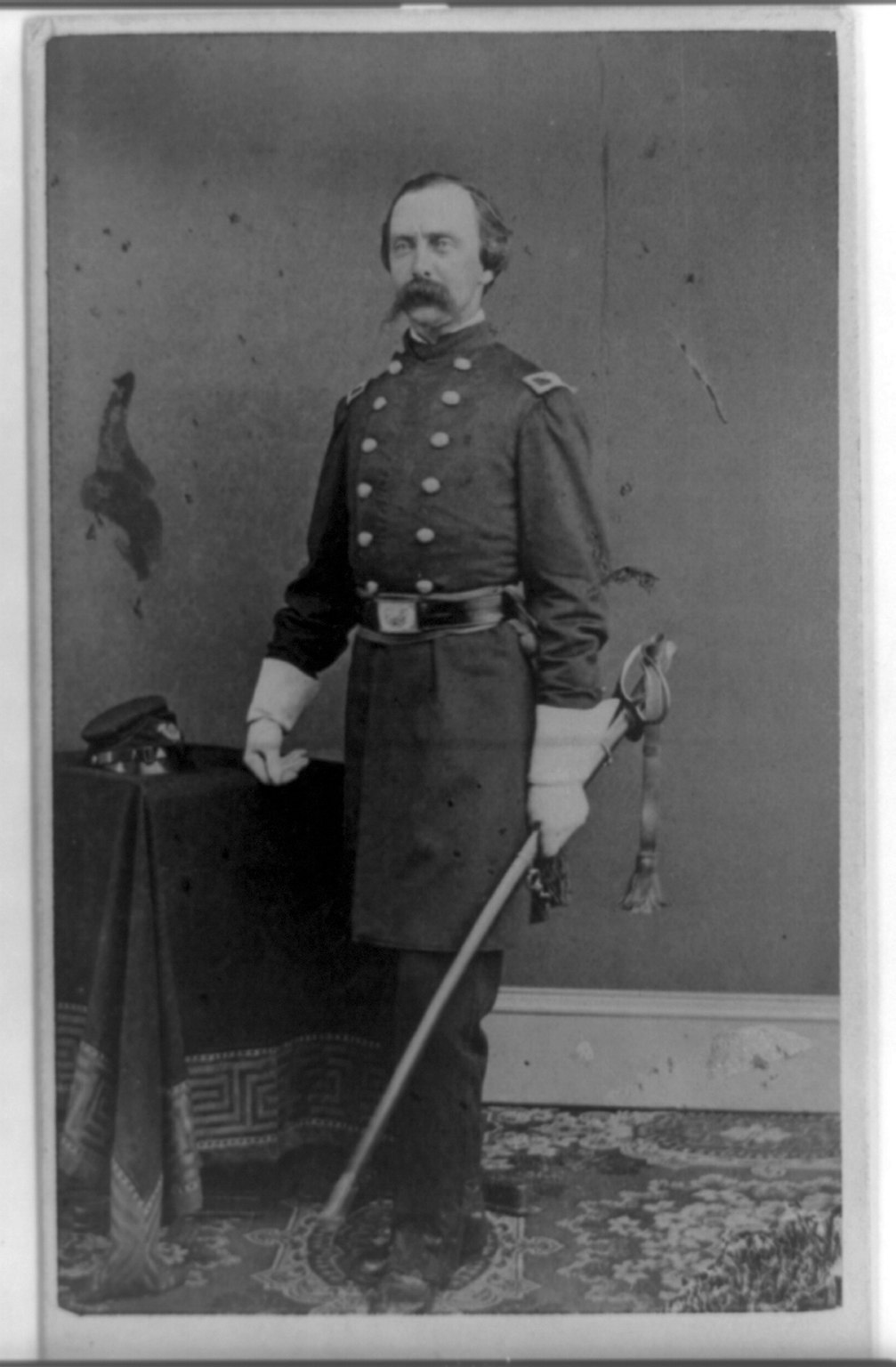
John S. Slocum

The fort was built by the 2nd Rhode Island Infantry. It was named after Colonel John Slocum of the 2nd Rhode Island Infantry, killed in action on July 21, 1861, at the First Battle of Bull Run (also known as the First Battle of Manassas). The fort perimeter measured 653 yards (597 m) and covered the Rock Creek Church Road (today Blair Road) and New Hampshire Avenue.

The fort contained the following equipment:

- One 8-inch siege howitzer
- Two 24-pounder siege guns
- Two 24-pounder seacoast guns
- Four 24-pounder howitzers
- Seven 4.5-inch siege rifle
- Six 10-pounder rifled Parrott rifles
- One 10-inch siege mortar M. 1841
- Two 24-pounder Coehorn mortars

The batteries were never completed on the east and west of the fort. If they had, an extra ten more guns could have been added.

The following elements garrisoned at the fort at some point during the war:

- 76th New York Volunteer Infantry
- 1st New Hampshire Heavy Artillery Volunteer Regiment
- 150th Ohio National Guard
- 14th Independent Battery Michigan Light Artillery
- Pennsylvania Independent Light Artillery Battery E known as "Knapp's Battery"

It provided support to Fort Stevens west of Fort Slocum. When the Confederate States Army attacked Fort Stevens on July 11 and July 12, 1864, Fort Slocum fired its long-range guns. During the battle, 1,500 employees of the Army Quartermaster office led by General Montgomery Meigs assisted the garrison along with 2,800 hospitalized soldiers from the nearby hospitals under the command of Colonel Francis Price.

== Post Civil War ==
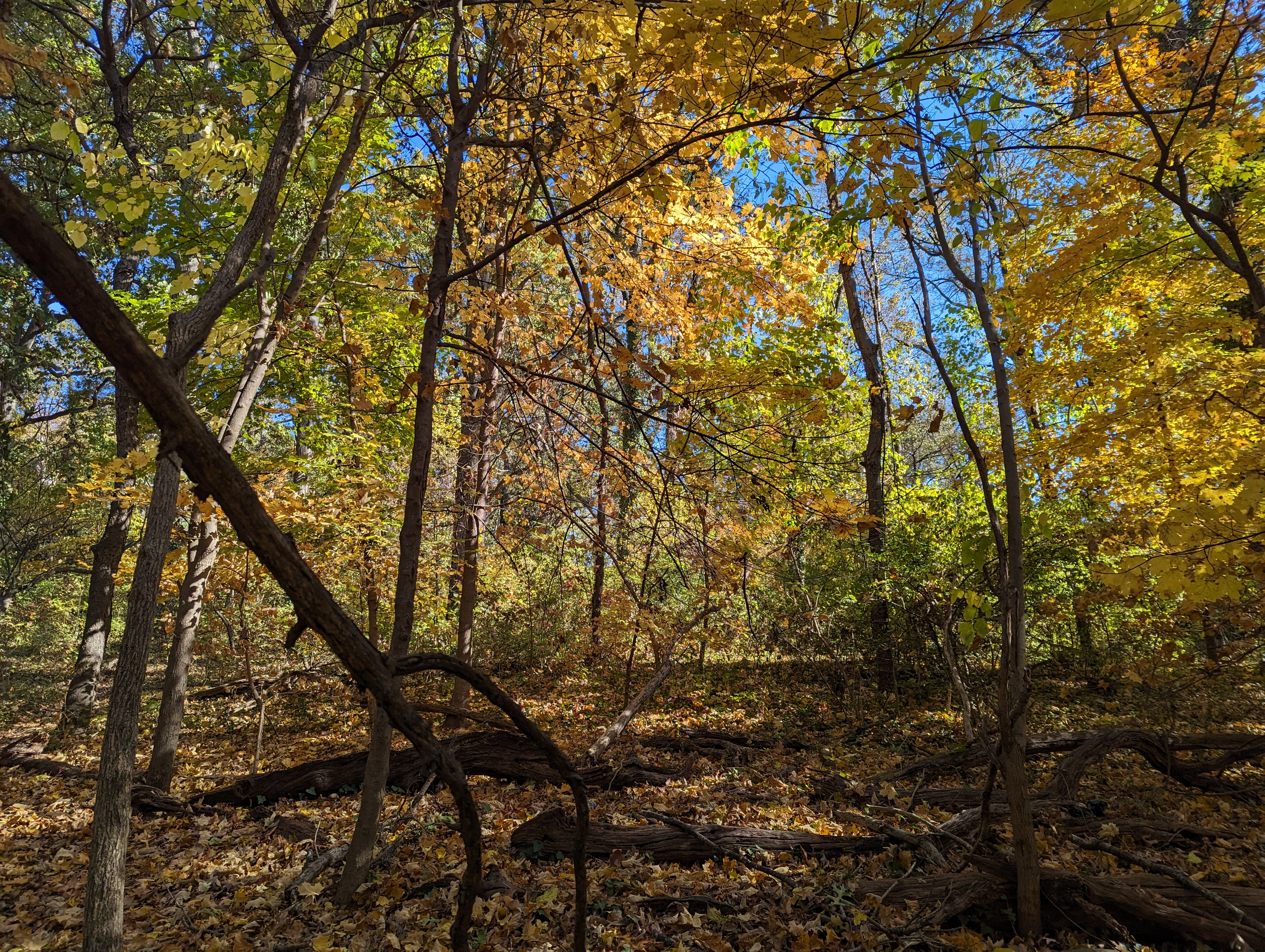
A trail within Fort Slocum Park

Today, no visible evidence remains of Fort Slocum. During World War II, the fort and its surroundings were demolished when victory gardens were planted to support the war effort. Presently the park is administered as part of Rock Creek Park, and has forested trails and picnic areas.

== See also ==
- Civil War Defenses of Washington
- Washington, D.C., in the American Civil War
- Fort Totten
- Fort Slemmer
- Fort Bunker Hill
- Fort Saratoga
- Fort Thayer
- Fort Lincoln
- Battle of Fort Stevens
- Siege artillery in the American Civil War
