= 14th Independent Michigan Light Artillery Battery =

- Michigan state flag
- Active: January 5, 1864, to July 1, 1865
- Country: United States
- Allegiance: Union
- Branch: Artillery
- Size: 223 (total enrollment)
- Part of: XXII Corps
- Engagements: Battle of Fort Stevens

The 14th Independent Michigan Light Artillery Battery was an artillery battery that served in the Union Army during the American Civil War.

== Service ==
Battery "M" was organized at Kalamazoo, Michigan, and mustered into service on January 5, 1864.

On February 1, 1864, the battery moved to Washington D.C., where they arrived to report to Camp Barry on February 5.

On February 20, the battery was mounted and moved to Fort Bunker Hill, remaining there until February 22, when they were ordered back to Camp Barry, dismounting their horses. On February 25, the battery moved to Fort Slocum and was stationed there for the rest of 1864.

From July 11 to 13, the battery took part in the Battle of Fort Stevens, as part of Jubal Early's march towards Washington, D.C. Since the battery had been dismounted, they later served as heavy artillery and were attached to Hardin's Division, XXII Corps, Department of Washington. The battery conducted garrison duty at Fort Snyder, Carroll, and Grebble until June 17, 1865.

The battery was mustered out on July 1, 1865.

== Total strength and casualties ==
Over its existence, the battery carried a total of 239 men on its muster rolls.

The battery lost nine enlisted men who died of disease, for a total of nine fatalities.

== Commanders ==
- Captain Charles Heine

== See also ==
- List of Michigan Civil War Units
- Michigan in the American Civil War
