= Fort Bunker Hill =

Historical fort in Washington, D.C., United States

- Part of the Civil War defenses of Washington, D.C.
- Washington, D.C.
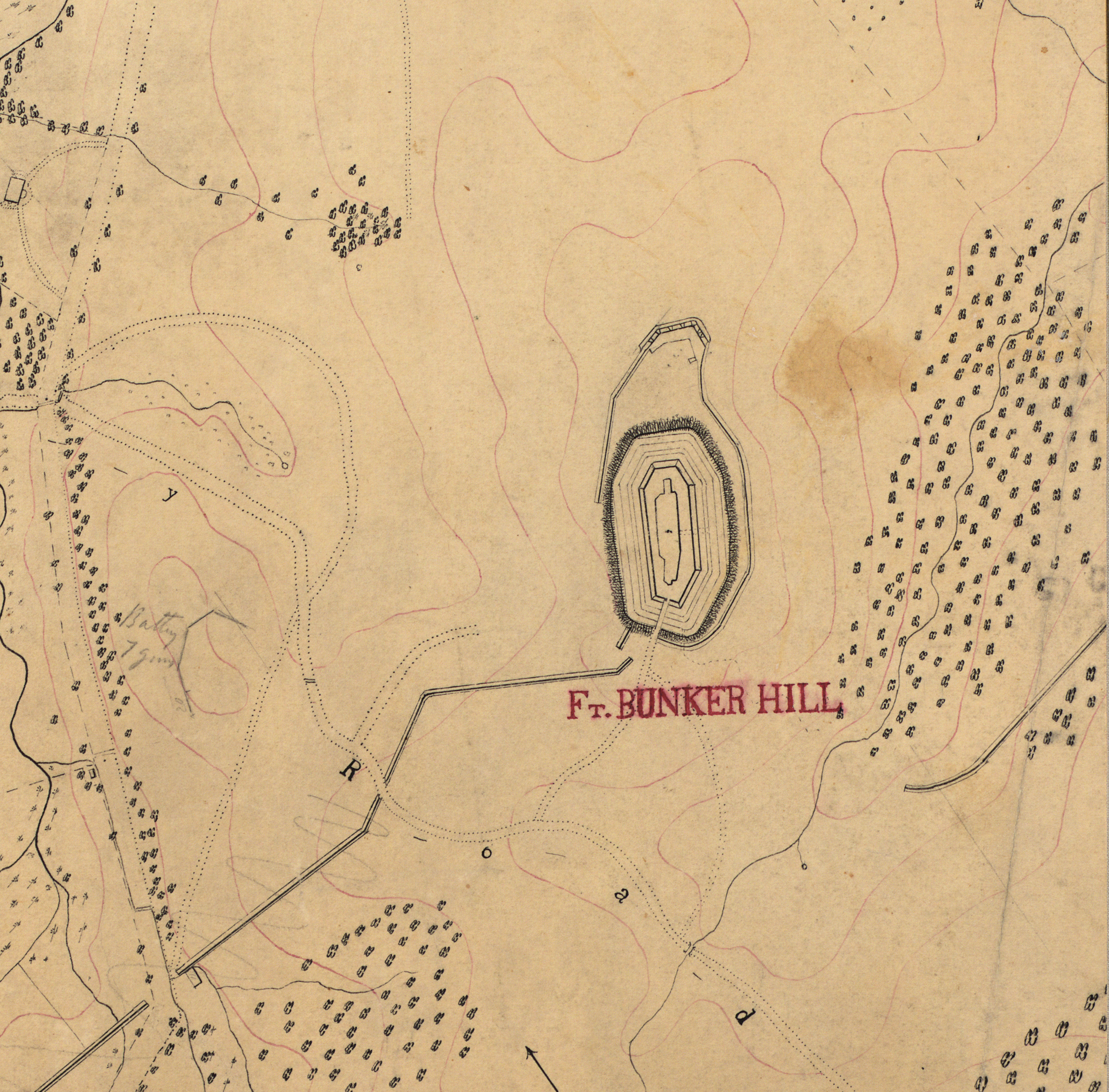
- Fort Bunker Hill on a map of 1863

Site information
- Type: Earthwork fort
- Controlled by: Union Army
- Condition: Residential Area

Location
- Coordinates: 38.93539°N 76.98775°W

Site history
- Built: 1861
- Built by: 11th Massachusetts Infantry regiment
- In use: 1861–1865
- Materials: Earth and timber
- Demolished: 1865
- Battles/wars: American Civil War

Fort Bunker Hill was one of seven temporary earthwork forts of the Civil War Defenses of Washington, D.C., built in the Northeast quadrant of the city at the beginning of the Civil War by the Union Army to protect the city from the Confederate Army. From west to east, the forts were: Fort Slocum, Fort Totten, Fort Slemmer, Fort Bunker Hill, Fort Saratoga, Fort Thayer and Fort Lincoln. Unlike other forts, today very little remains of the structure.

== Civil War ==
The fort was built in the fall of 1861 by soldiers from the 11th Regiment Massachusetts Volunteer Infantry on land owned by Henry Quinn and was named after the Battle of Bunker Hill of 1775 in Charlestown, Boston, Massachusetts. It was located between Fort Slemmer and Fort Saratoga and was intended to assist in the defense of the northeast approaches to Washington between Fort Totten and Fort Lincoln.

Company F of the 11th Vermont Infantry Regiment was assigned to Fort Bunker Hill to assist in the defense of the city until November 17, 1862. Thirteen guns were mounted in the rectangular-shaped fort, which operated until the conclusion of hostilities in 1865.

The following armament was assigned to Fort Bunker Hill:

- Eight 32-pounder James rifle (barbette)
- One 8-inch siege howitzer
- One Coehorn mortar
- One 10-inch siege mortar M. 1841
- One 4-inch ordnance
- Two 30-pounder Parrotts

The following troops garrisoned at Fort Bunker Hill:

- 11th Regiment Massachusetts Volunteer Infantry
- Company B, Main Coast Guards
- Detachment 2d Company, New Hampshire Heavy Artillery
- 150th Ohio National Guard
- Battery G, 3rd United States Artillery

A supporting field battery stood a few yards to the North.

== Post Civil War ==
The site of the fort is bounded by 14th, Otis, 13th, and Perry Streets NE in Brookland, DC. Today, little remains of the fort, and the site is maintained by the National Park Service.

A marker by the National Park Service commemorates the Fort:

Fort Bunker Hill

One of the Civil War Defenses of Washington erected in the fall of 1861, Fort Bunker Hill occupied an important position between Fort Totten and Fort Lincoln in the defense of the National Capital. Thirteen guns and mortars were mounted in the fort.

United States Department of the Interior

National Park Service

A nearby road was named Bunker Hill Road after the fort, but it was later renamed Michigan Avenue.

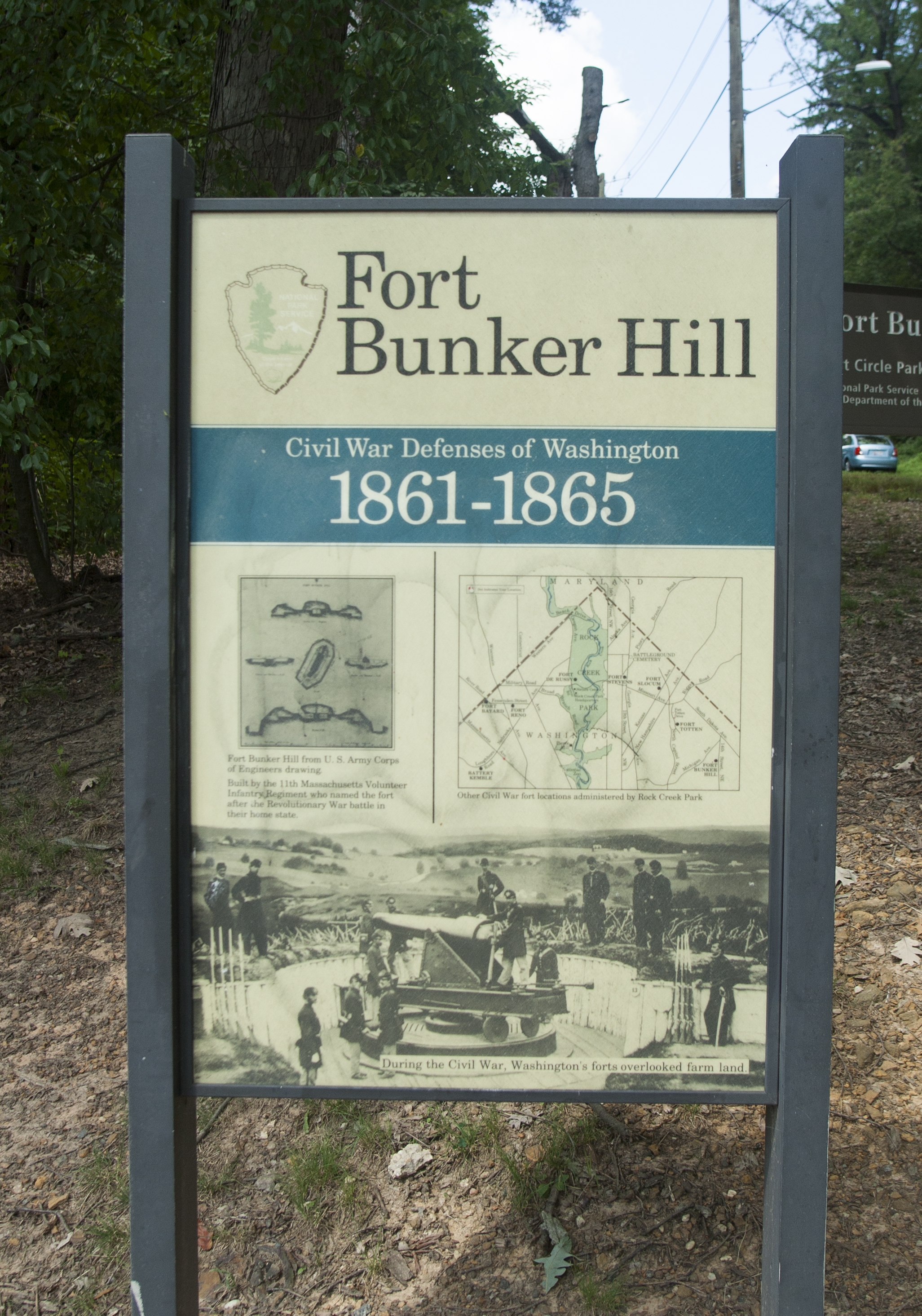
NPS sign of Fort Bunker Hill

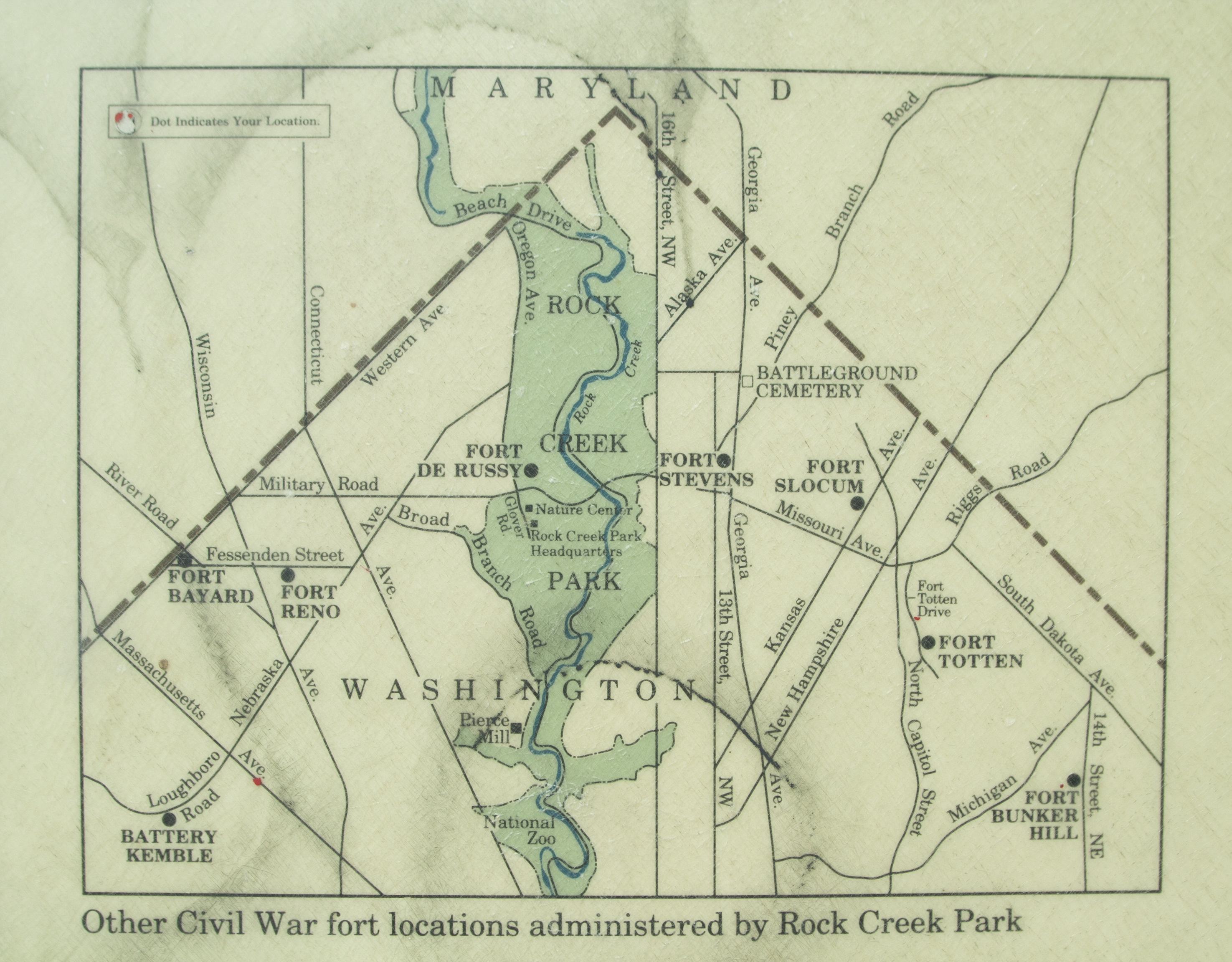
Image of NPS Map at Fort Bunker Hill site in Washington, DC

== See also ==
- Civil War Defenses of Washington
- Washington, D.C., in the American Civil War
- Fort Slocum
- Fort Totten
- Fort Slemmer
- Fort Saratoga
- Fort Thayer
- Fort Lincoln
- Battle of Fort Stevens
