= Fort Totten Park =

Washington, D.C. Civil War memorial site

Fort Totten
- Part of the Civil War defenses of Washington, D.C.
- Washington, D.C.
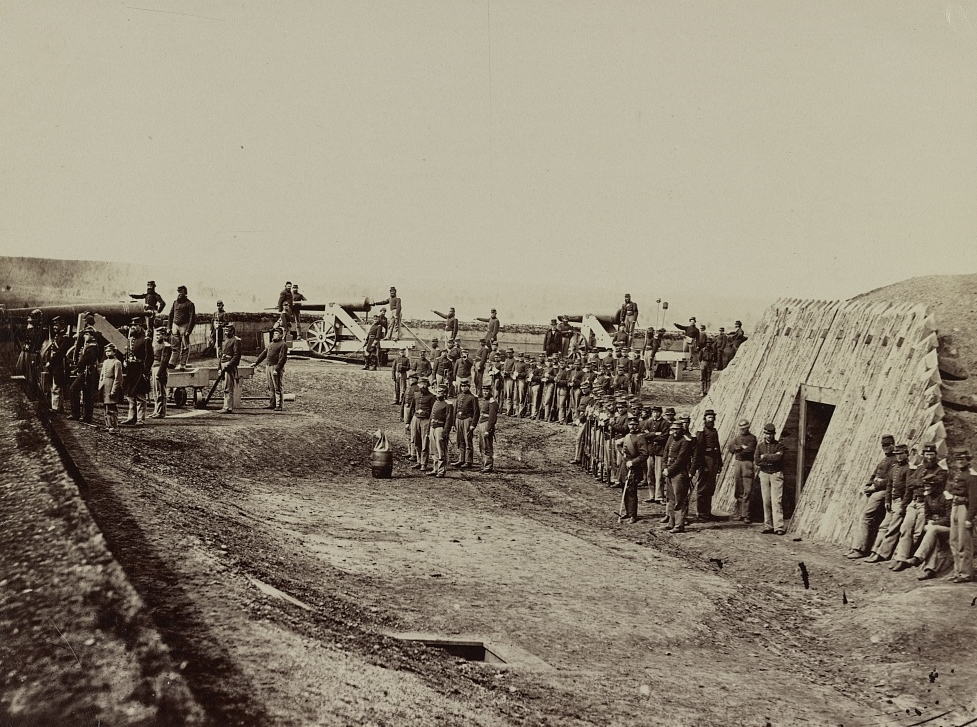
- Fort Totten during the Civil War

Site information
- Type: Earthwork fort
- Controlled by: Union Army
- Condition: Residential Area

Location
- Coordinates: 38°56′49″N 77°00′15″W

Site history
- Battles/wars: American Civil War

Fort Totten Park is an American Civil War memorial on the site of a Union fort in Washington, DC. It is under the management of the National Park Service.

== History ==
Fort Totten was a Union Army defensive earthwork, built during the Civil War and named for Joseph Totten. It was built up during the fall of 1861, as part of the defense of Washington, D.C., during the Civil War, also known as the Fort Circle. Construction on the fort began in August 1861 and was completed in 1863.

Fort Totten was one of seven temporary earthwork forts built in the Northeast quadrant of the city by the Union Army to protect the city from the Confederate Army. From west to east, the forts were as follows: Fort Slocum, Fort Totten, Fort Slemmer, Fort Bunker Hill, Fort Saratoga, Fort Thayer and Fort Lincoln. Today, it has become a park administered by the National Park Service in the neighborhood of Fort Totten.

== Structure ==
Fort Totten was a medium-sized fort, a seven-sided polygon with a perimeter of 272 yards (249 m). It was located atop a ridge along the main road from Washington to Silver Spring, Maryland, about three miles (5 km) north of the Capitol, and a half-mile from the Military Asylum or Soldiers' Home, where President Abraham Lincoln spent his summers while president. The fort was of typical design for its time, with earth walls some 15 feet (4.6 m) thick and 8 feet (2.4 m) high. Outside the walls (or "ramparts") was a large ditch or dry moat over seven feet deep and twelve feet wide, and outside that was a broad cleared area surrounding a barrier of tree branches, brambles and general debris (or abatis). Along the inner surface of the wall were gun platforms for several types of cannon, some firing over the parapet, others firing through openings in it, and a banquette, a kind of shelf on which soldiers could stand to fire over the wall.

The fort had the following armament:

- Four 6-pounder field guns (bronze)
- Eight 32-pounder Parrotts
- Two 8-inch siege howitzers
- One Coehorn mortar
- One 10-inch mortar M. 1841
- Three 30-pounder Parrotts
- One 100-pounder Parrott

Wartime garrisons were manned by:

- 76th New York Infantry (Headquarters in February 1862)
- 2nd Pennsylvania Heavy Artillery Regiment
- 136th Pennsylvania Infantry
- 137th Pennsylvania Infantry

The fort saw action during the Battle of Fort Stevens on July 11 and 12, 1864 when Confederate General Jubal A. Early attacked the fort.

Men and gun of 3d Massachusetts Heavy Artillery at the Fort Totten ornamental gate in 1865

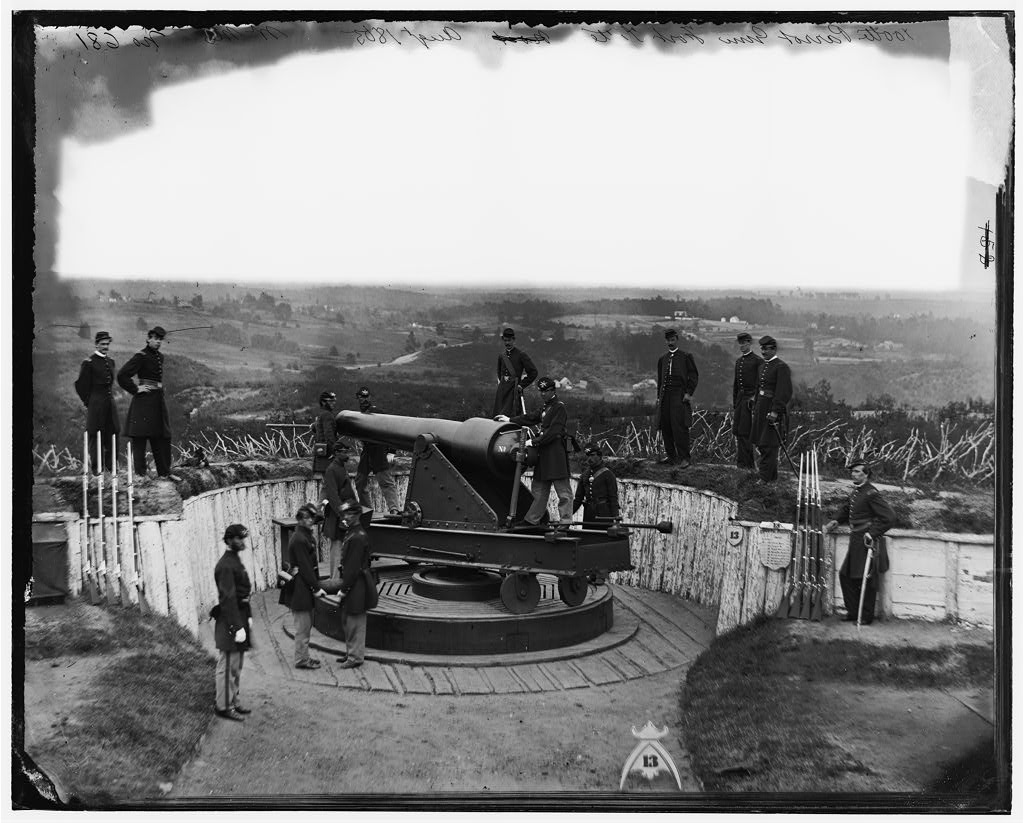
Officers of Companies
A and B
3d Massachusetts Heavy Artillery and crew of 100-pdr Parrott gun on iron barbette carriage
at Fort Totten

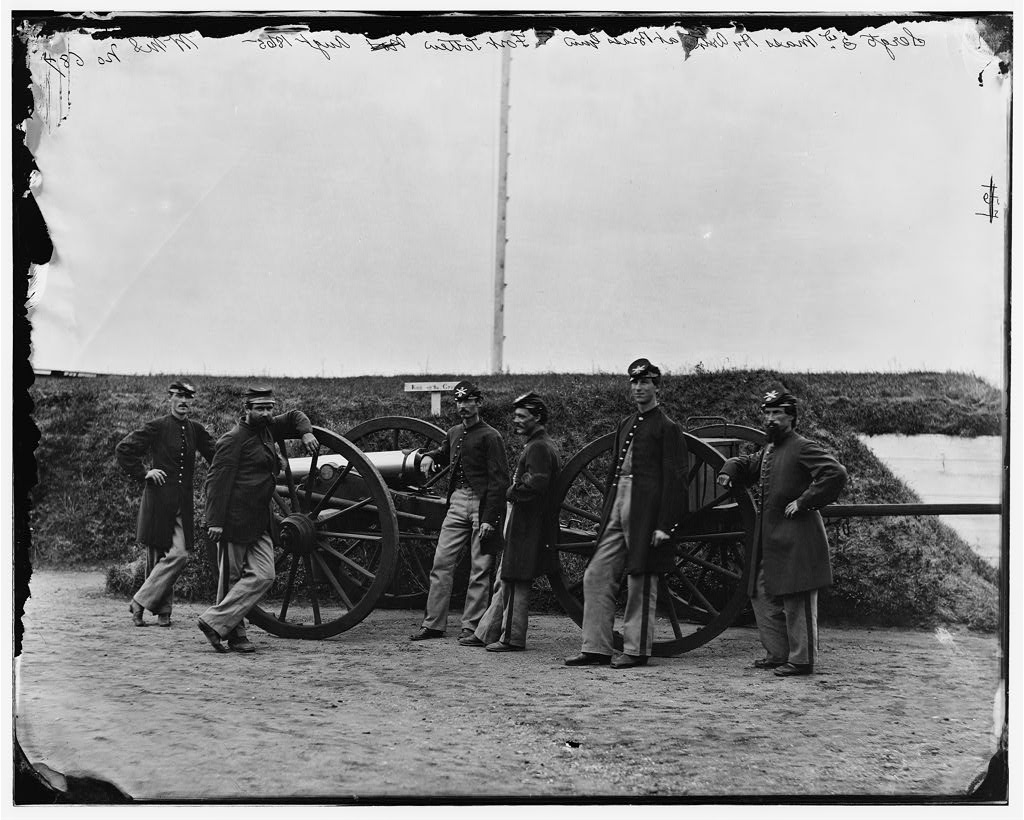
Sergeants of 3rd Massachusetts Heavy Artillery, with gun and caisson at Fort Totten

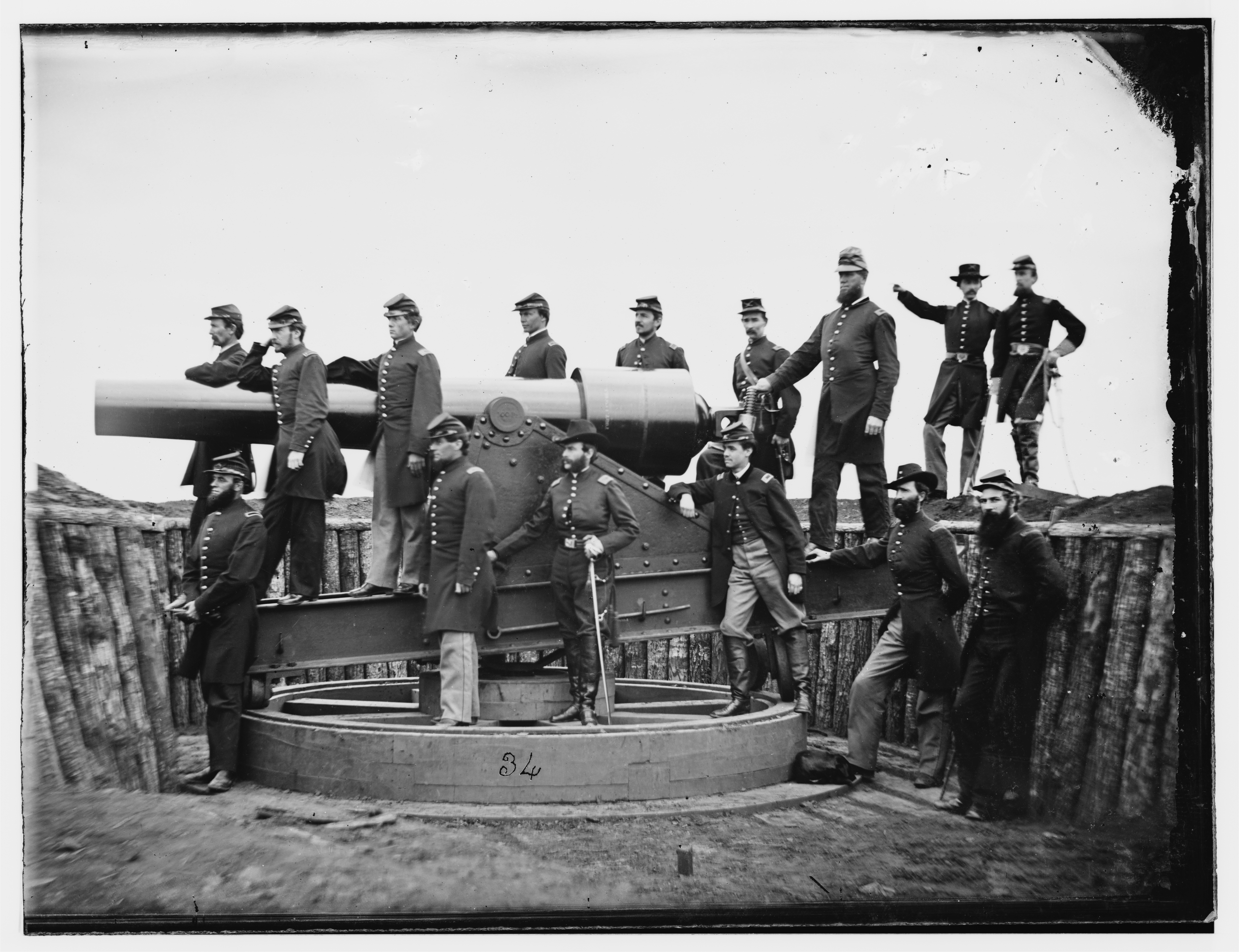
Officers of 3rd Regiment Massachusetts Heavy Artillery

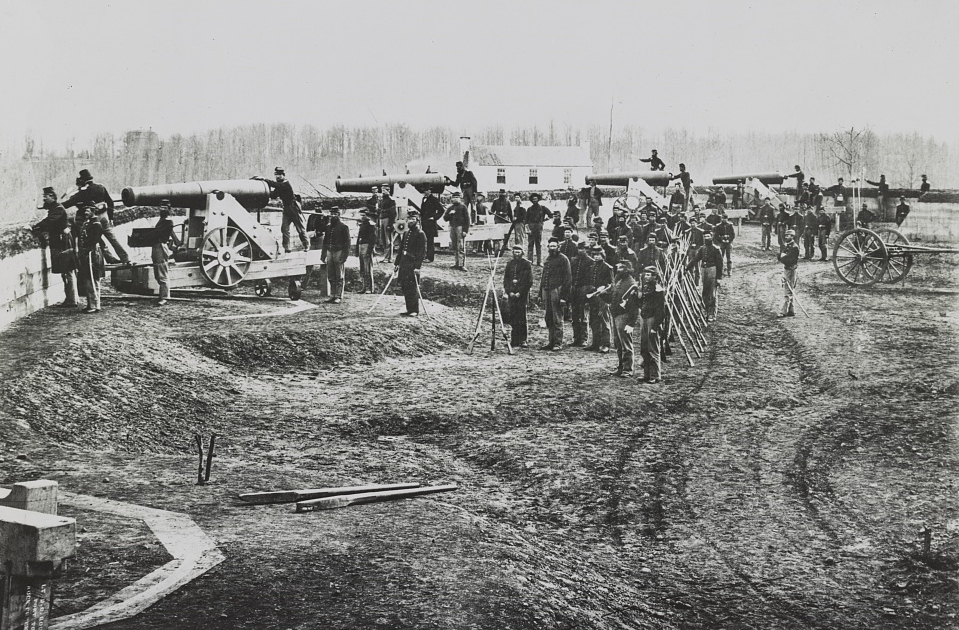
Interior view of Fort Totten

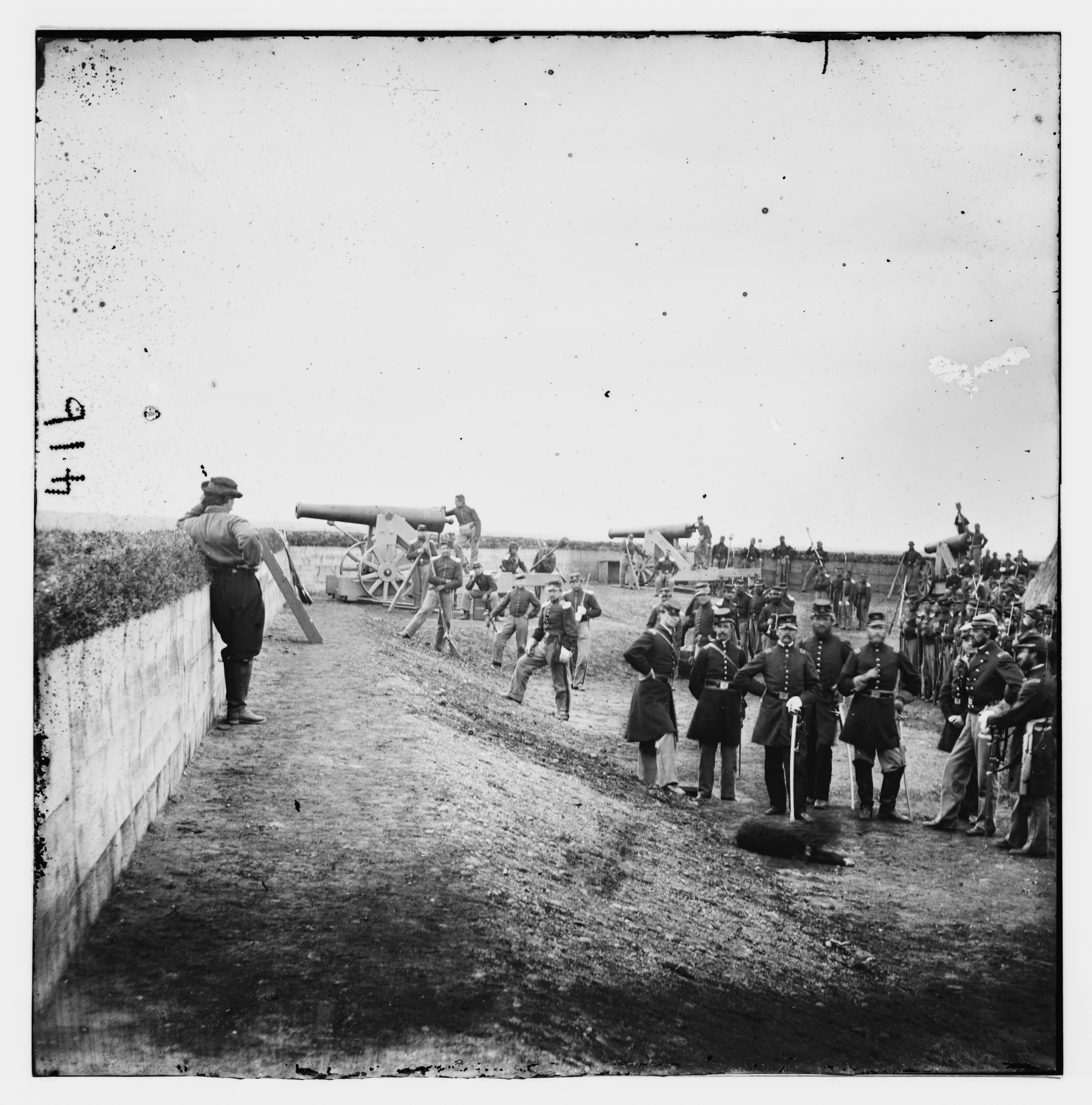
Interior of Fort Totten

Officers of Companies A and B, 3d Massachusetts Heavy Artillery, before quarters at Fort Totten

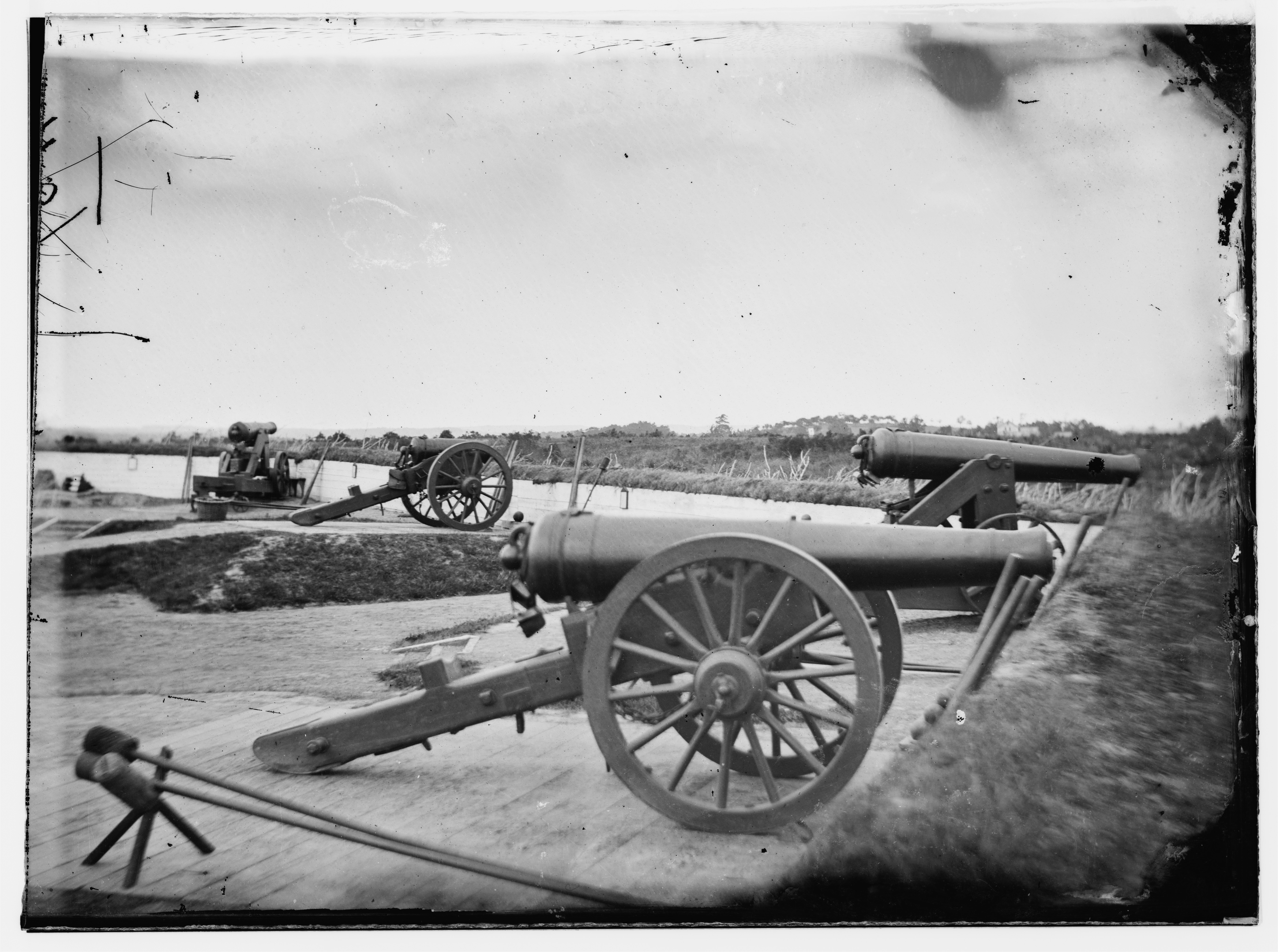
Washington, District of Columbia. James rifles in Fort Totten

== Post Civil War ==
With the end of the war in 1865, the fort was deactivated. Today, it is maintained by the National Park Service but is in poor state.

A Washington Metro station, Fort Totten station, is named after the fort. The city street hugging the line to the rear of the fort is called Fort Totten Drive.

== See also ==
- Civil War Defenses of Washington
- Washington, D.C., in the American Civil War
- Fort Slocum
- Fort Slemmer
- Fort Bunker Hill
- Fort Saratoga
- Fort Thayer
- Fort Lincoln
- Battle of Fort Stevens
