= Fort Lincoln (District of Columbia) =

- Part of the Civil War defenses of Washington, D.C.
- Washington, D.C.
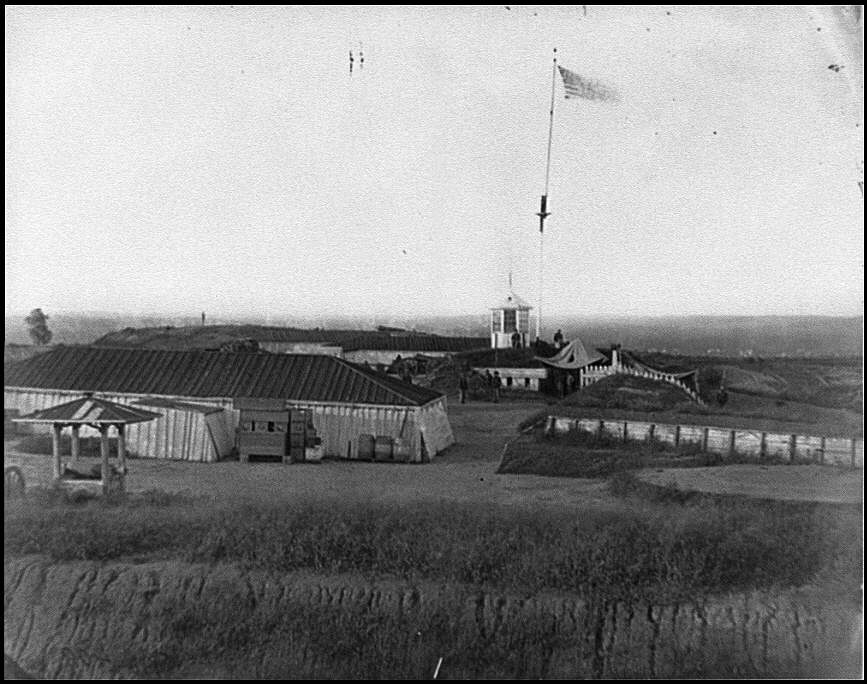
- Interior view of Fort Lincoln in 1865

Site information
- Type: Earthwork fort
- Controlled by: Union Army
- Condition: Residential Area

Location
- Location within District of Columbia
- Coordinates: 38°55′31″N 76°57′04″W

Site history
- Built: 1861
- Built by: 11th Massachusetts Infantry regiment
- In use: 1861–1865
- Materials: Earth and timber
- Demolished: 1865
- Battles/wars: American Civil War

Fort Lincoln was one of seven temporary earthwork forts of the Civil War Defenses of Washington, DC built in the Northeast quadrant of the city at the beginning of the Civil War by the Union Army to protect the city from the Confederate Army. From west to east, the forts were as follows: Fort Slocum, Fort Totten, Fort Slemmer, Fort Bunker Hill, Fort Saratoga, Fort Thayer and Fort Lincoln.

Battery Jamson was a large battery east of the fort overlooking the Anacostia River providing additional support.

== Civil War ==
Fort Lincoln was built starting on August 26, 1861 by the First Regiment Massachusetts Volunteer Infantry along the border of the District of Columbia and Prince George's County, Maryland it was named in honor of President Abraham Lincoln by General Order No. 18, A.G.O., Sept. 30, 1861. It was built on the old Baltimore Pike, 2 and 1/2 miles from the city at the time.

The fort had a perimeter of 466 yards (426 m) and places for 34 guns.

The fort was armed with the following guns:

- Eight 6-pounder field guns (bronze)
- Four 12-pounder field guns
- Five 24-pounder James gun (barbette)
- One 24-pounder James gun
- Six 32-pounder sea-coast howitzers
- Two 24-pounder howitzers
- Two 8-inch howitzers
- Two Coehorn mortars
- One 10-inch mortar M. 1841
- Four 30-pounder Parrotts
- One 100-pounder Parrott

The following troops were garrisoned at Fort Lincoln:

- Old Joe Hooker's brigade composed of the First Regiment Massachusetts Volunteer Infantry, 11th Regiment Massachusetts Volunteer Infantry, 2nd New Hampshire Volunteer Infantry and 26th Pennsylvania Infantry
- 3rd Regiment Massachusetts Volunteer Heavy Artillery
- Battery D, 1st Rhode Island Light Artillery
- Company A, Main Coast Guards
- Detachments of the New Hampshire Heavy Artillery
- 150th Ohio National Guards

A cavalry outpost was located close by with the 7th Michigan Volunteer Cavalry Regiment composed of about 500 men under the command of Major Darling. During the Battle of Fort Stevens On the afternoon of July 12, 1864, had a brush with the enemy's cavalry beyond Bladensburg, Maryland. Captain T.S. Paddock was in command of the fort at the time.

To the East, was located Battery Jameson. It was established in 1862 as an outer works of the fort on a bluff in Prince George's County, Maryland under the direction of Brigadier General John G. Barnard and named after Major General Charles D. Jameson, who died of typhoid fever on November 6, 1862. It was at the end of the line and overlooked he Eastern Branch of the Potomac River (now the Anacostia River with several other smaller unnamed batteries around.

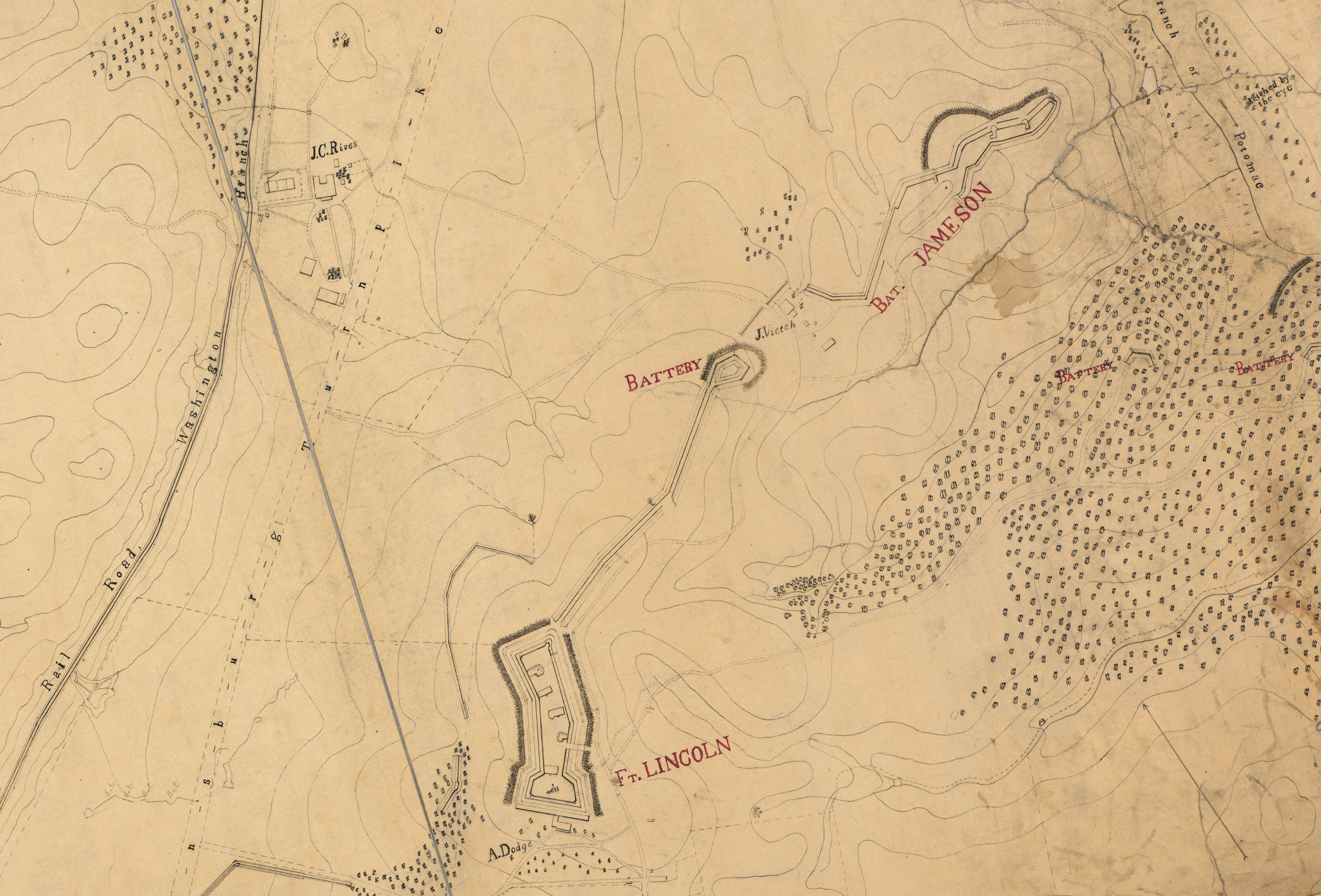
Fort Lincoln in 1863 with the batteries

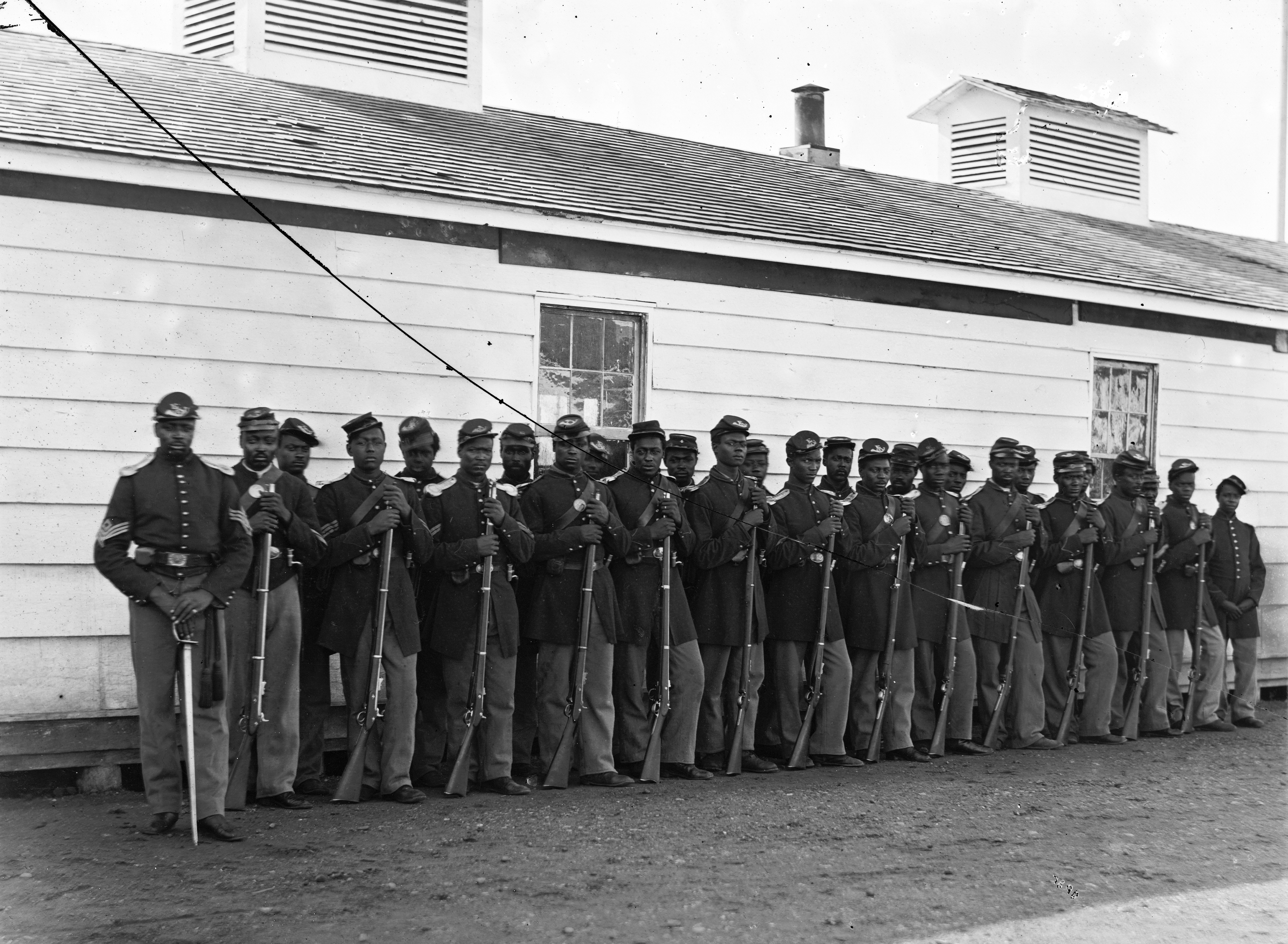
District of Columbia. Company E, 4th U.S. Colored Infantry, at Fort Lincoln

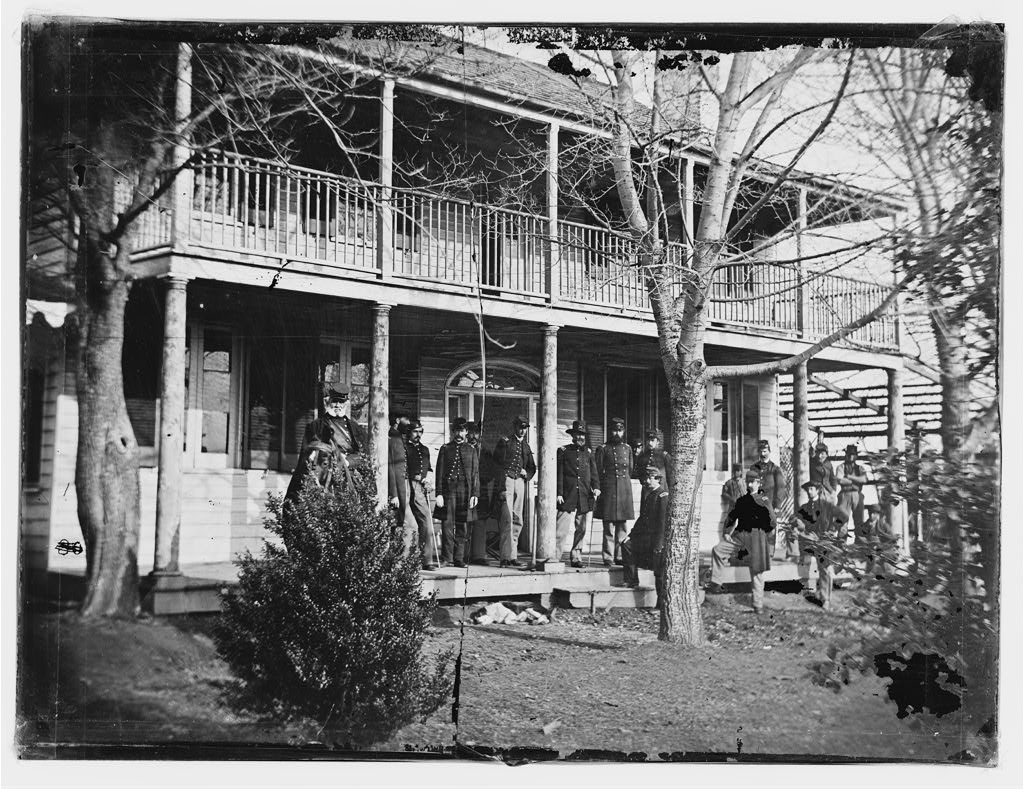
Brigade headquarters at Fort Lincoln in 1861

Gun crews of Company H, 3rd Massachusetts Heavy Artillery at Fort Lincoln

== Post-Civil War ==
Today, the majority of the remaining fort is within Fort Lincoln Cemetery in Prince George's County, Maryland and can be visited. A marker has been placed to commemorate the fort.

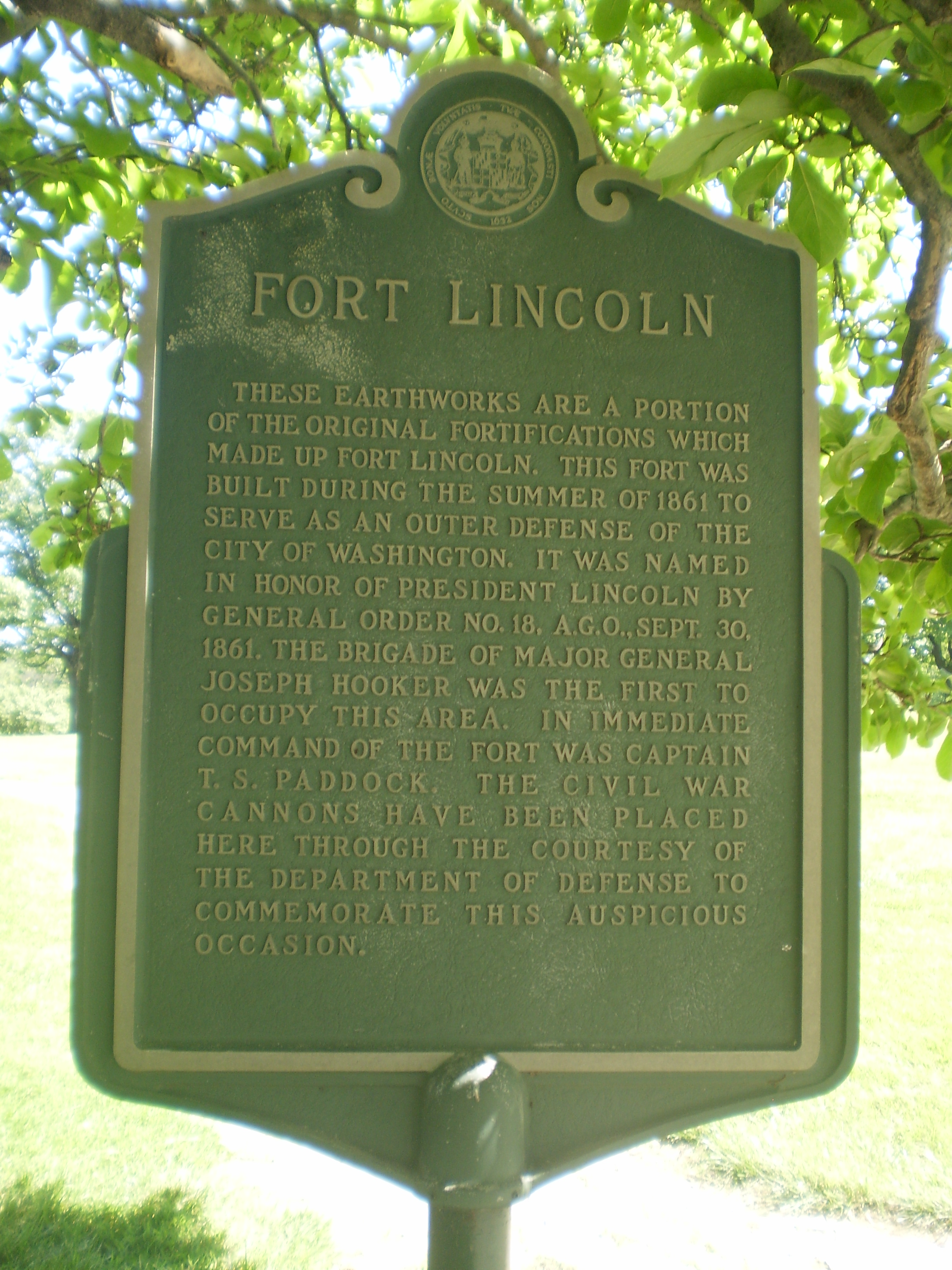
Historical Marker in Fort Lincoln Cemetery, Colmar Manor, Maryland

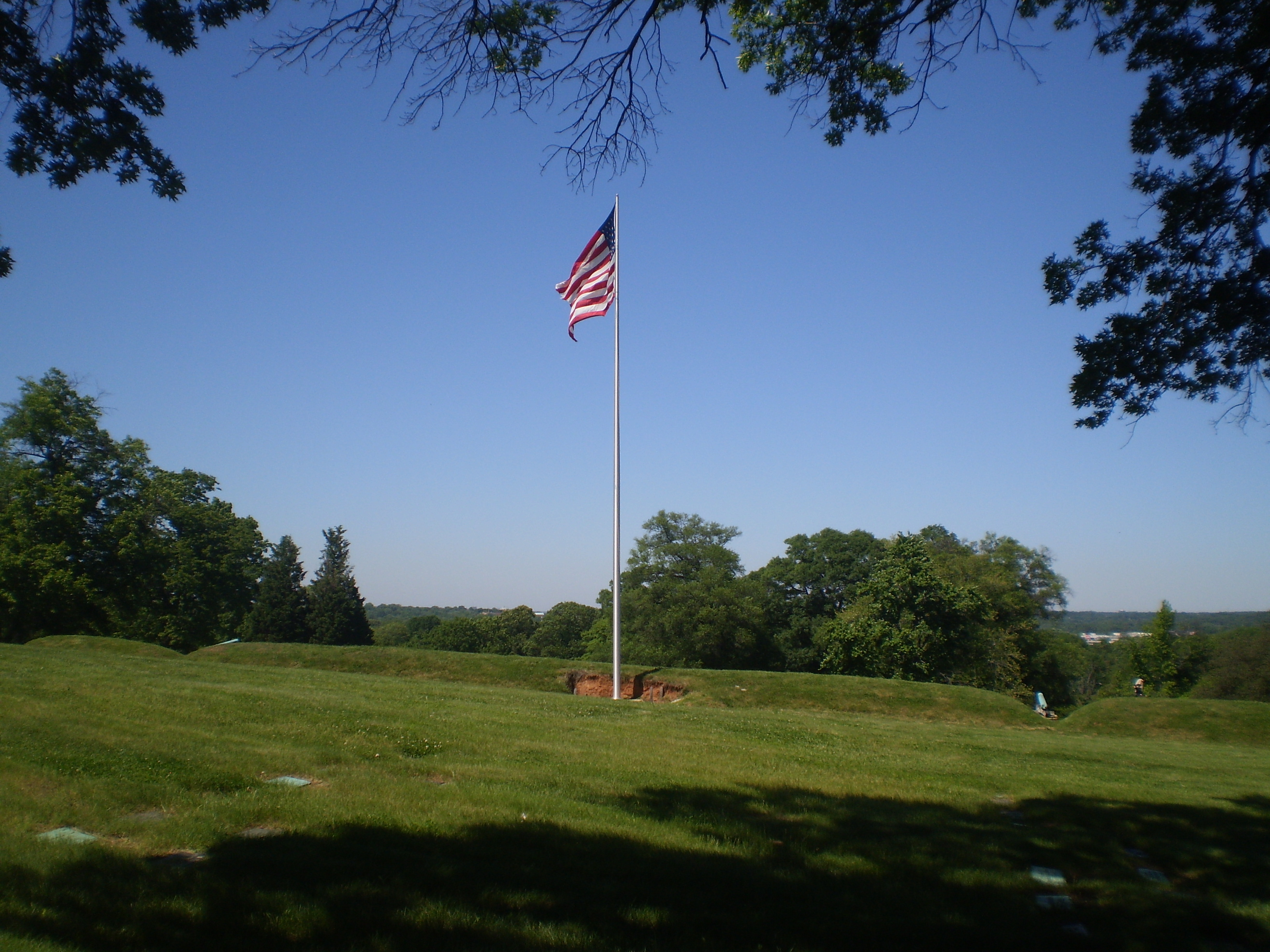
All that remains of Fort Lincoln is the flag, earthenworks, and three cannons at Fort Lincoln Cemetery, Colmar Manor, Maryland. The Old Spring House is off to the left.

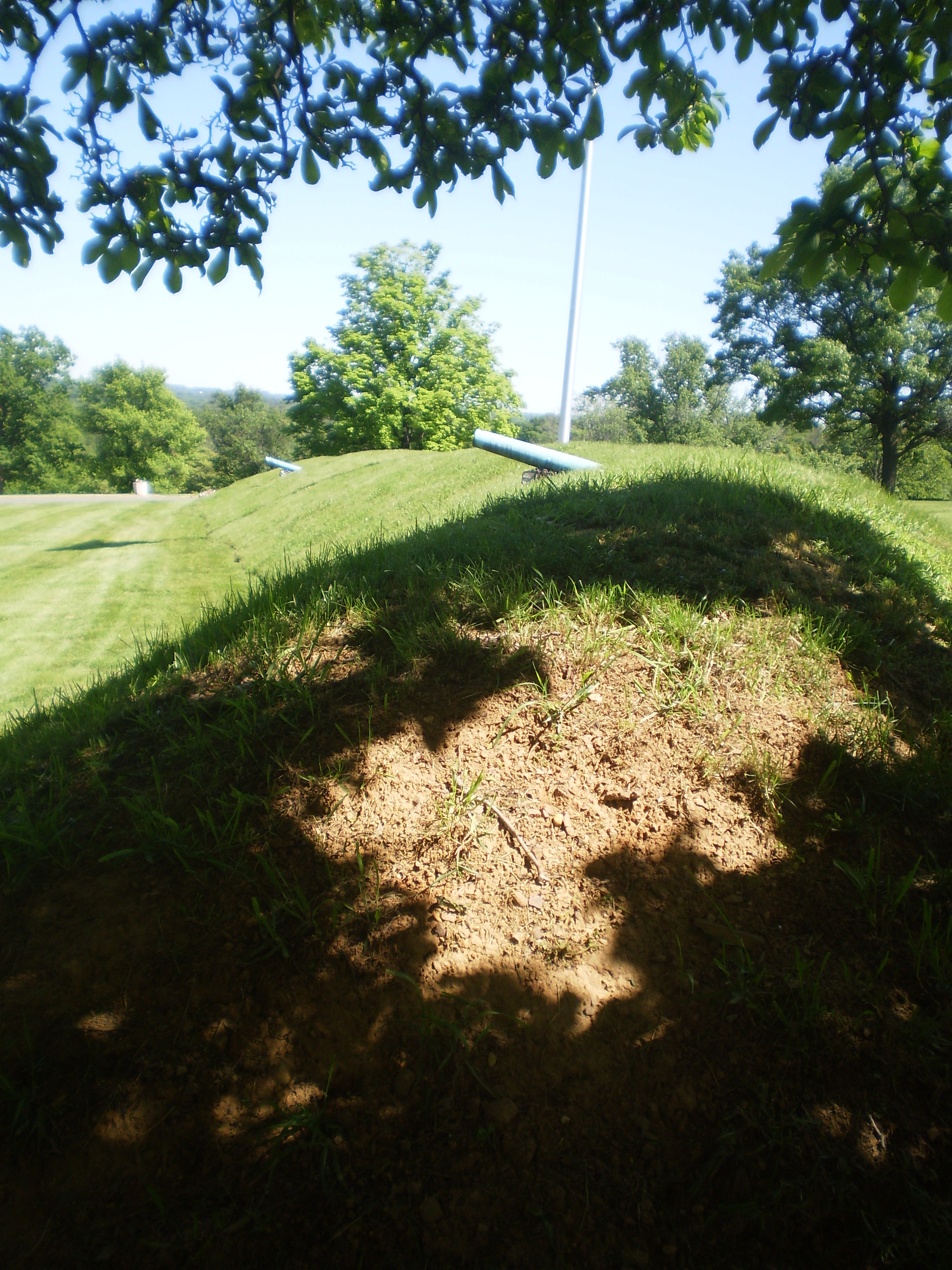
The last earthworks for Fort Lincoln at Fort Lincoln Cemetery, Colmar Manor, Maryland.

== See also ==
- Civil War Defenses of Washington
- Washington, D.C., in the American Civil War
- Abraham Lincoln
- Fort Slocum
- Fort Totten
- Fort Slemmer
- Fort Bunker Hill
- Fort Saratoga
- Fort Thayer
- Battle of Fort Stevens
