= Fort Slemmer =

- Part of the Civil War Defenses of Washington
- Brookland, Washington, D.C.
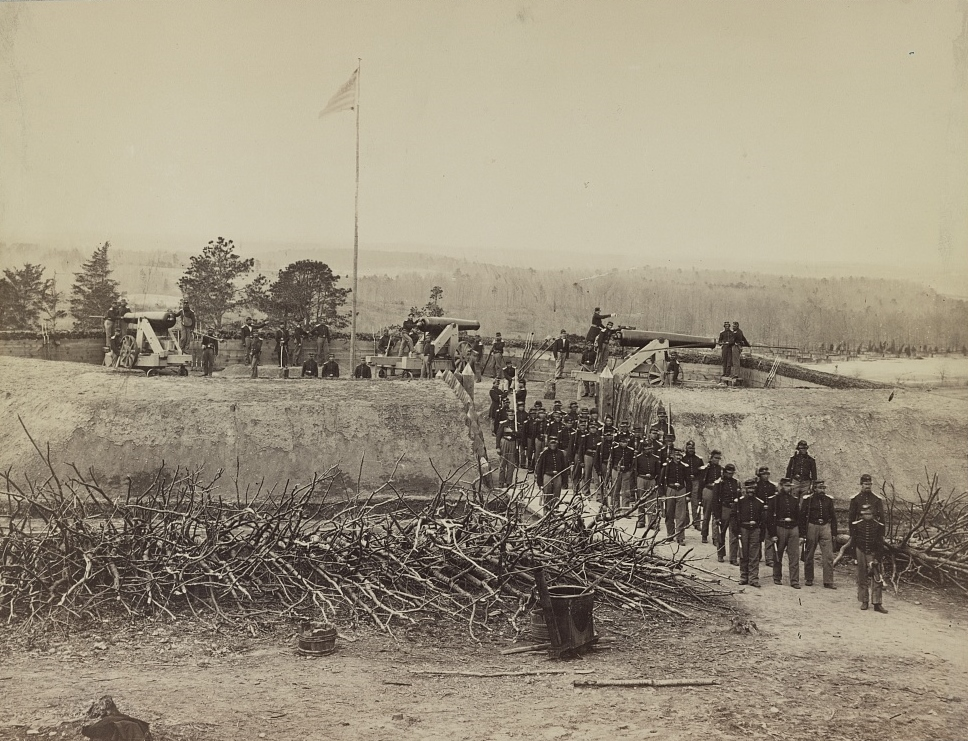
- The gate of Fort Slemmer

Site information
- Type: Earthwork fort
- Owner: Catholic University of America
- Controlled by: Union Army (1861–1865)
- Condition: Traces of some earthworks

Location
- Coordinates: 38°56′23″N 77°00′05″W
- Area: 93-yard (85 m) perimeter

Site history
- Built: 1861
- In use: 1862–1864
- Materials: Soil and timber
- Demolished: Yes
- Battles/wars: Battle of Fort Stevens

Garrison information
- Garrison: 2nd Regiment, Pennsylvania Heavy Artillery

Fort Slemmer sometimes called Battery Slemmer was one of seven temporary earthwork forts of the Civil War Defenses of Washington, D.C., built in the Northeast quadrant of the city at the beginning of the Civil War by the Union Army to protect the city from the Confederate Army. From west to east, the forts were as follows: Fort Slocum, Fort Totten, Fort Slemmer, Fort Bunker Hill, Fort Saratoga, Fort Thayer and Fort Lincoln. Unlike other forts, today very little remains of the structure.

== Civil War ==
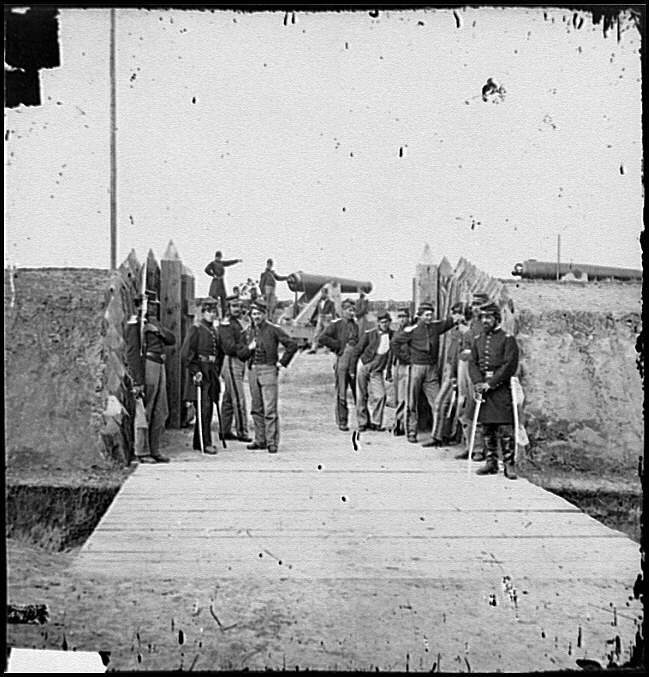
Soldiers at gate of Fort Slemmer

The fort was named in honor of Lieutenant Adam J. Slemmer. It was built in August 1861 between Fort Totten and Fort Bunker Hill on the east side of Harewood Road just north of The Catholic University of America's Marist Hall. In February 1862, the 20th New York moved in the fort.

The fort was equipped with the following armament:

- Three 32-pounder James guns
- One 8-inch siege howitzer

The following troops garrisoned in the fort:

- 20th New York
- Several New Hampshire Heavy Artillery
- 150th Ohio National Guard
- Battery G, 3rd United States Artillery

== Post Civil War ==
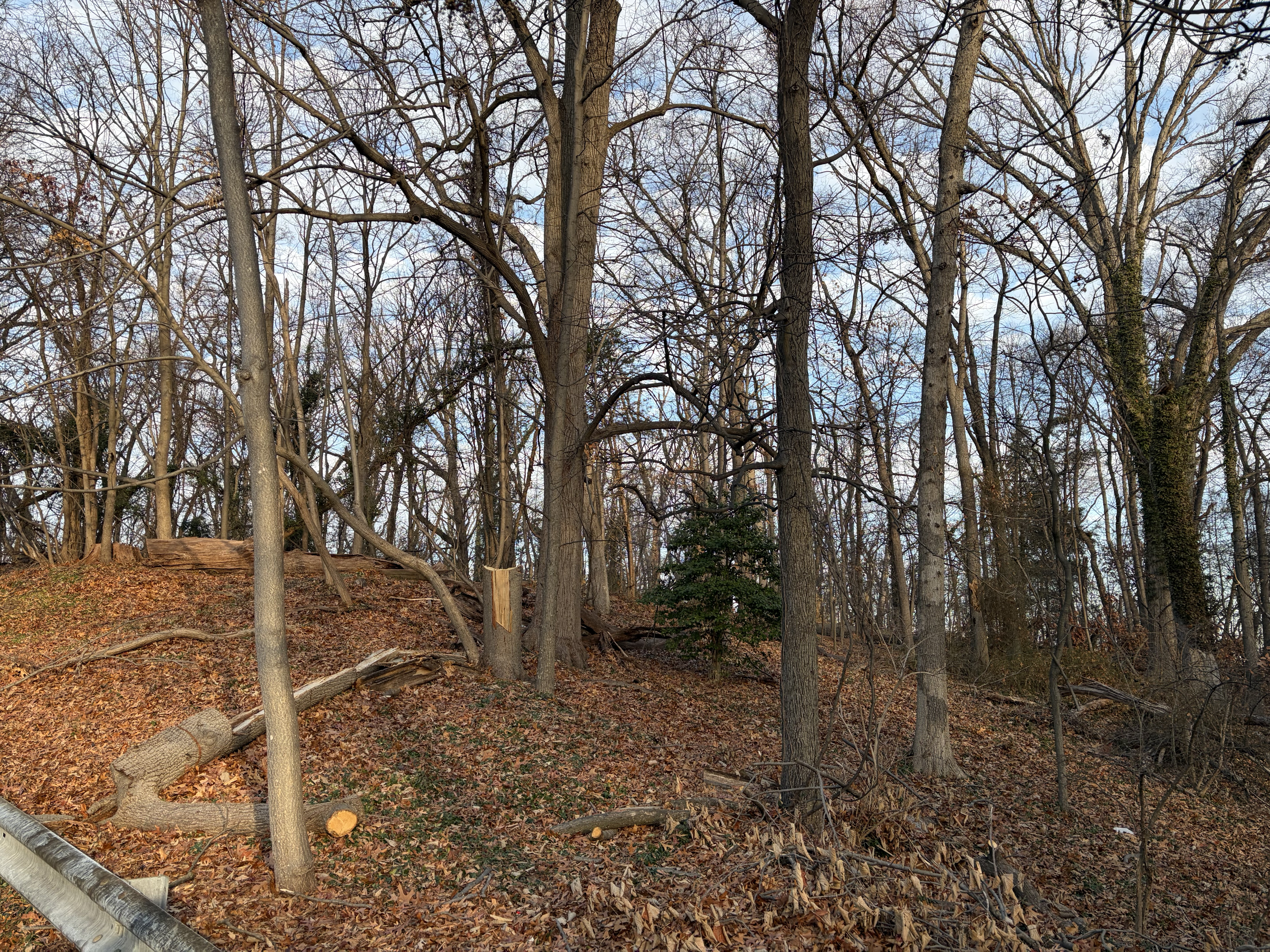
Eroded remnants of Civil War-era Fort Slemmer on the campus of Catholic University of America.

The fort was abandoned at the end of the civil war in 1865. It fell in disrepair after the war.

== See also ==
- Civil War Defenses of Washington
- Washington, D.C., in the American Civil War
- Fort Slocum
- Fort Totten
- Fort Bunker Hill
- Fort Saratoga
- Fort Thayer
- Fort Lincoln
- Battle of Fort Stevens
