= Manor Park (Washington, D.C.) =

Neighborhood of Washington, D.C.

Coordinates: 38.9636°N 77.0158°W

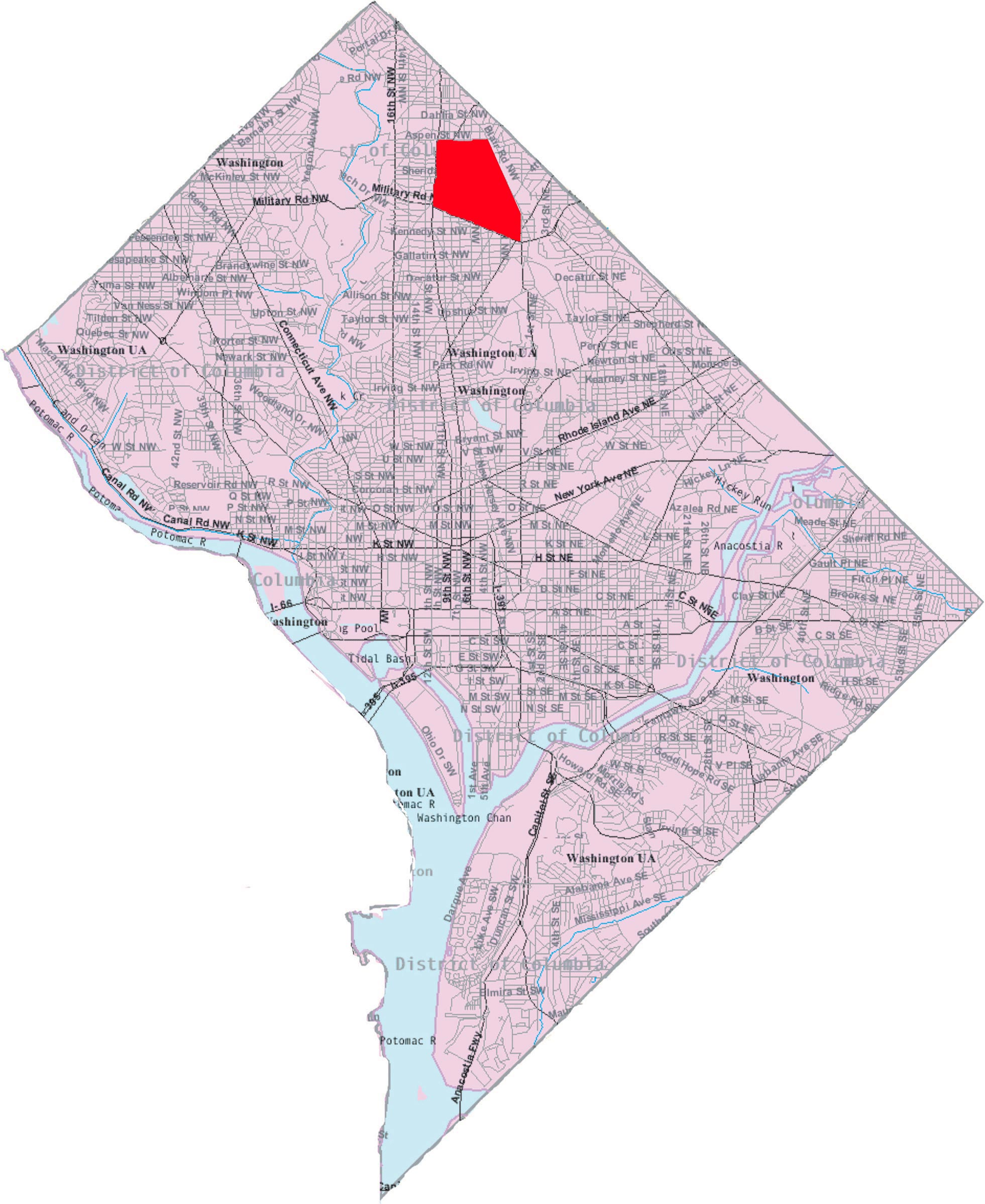
Map of Washington, D.C., with Manor Park highlighted in red

Manor Park is a neighborhood in Ward 4 of northwest Washington, D.C., United States.

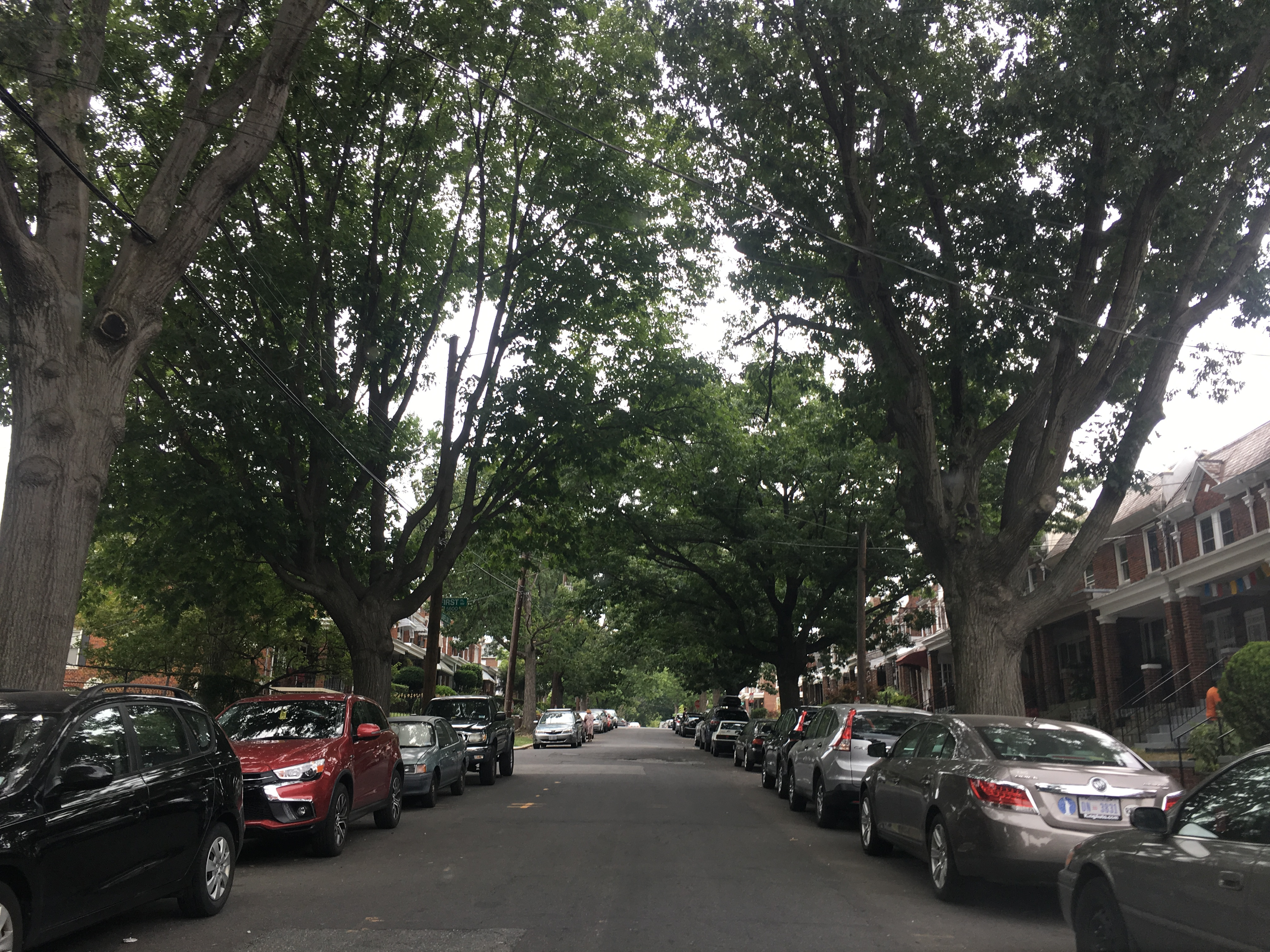
Manor Park in July 2018. Taken at the intersection of 1st PL NW and Longfellow St NW

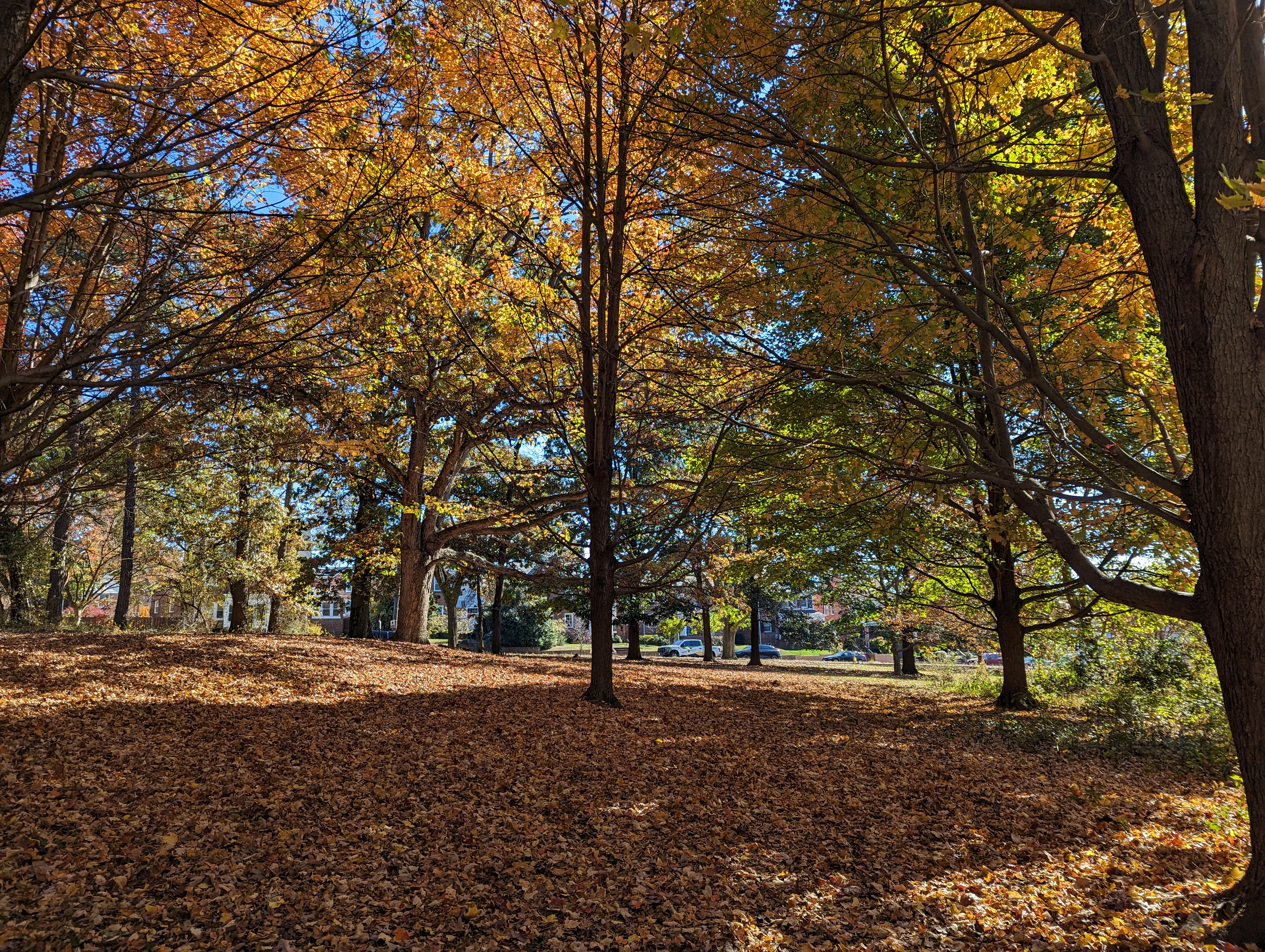
Fort Slocum is part of the Civil War Defenses of Washington and now acts as a neighborhood park

The National Capital Planning Commission's 1967 "District Communities" map indicates that the neighborhood is roughly bounded between 8th Street NW to the west, North Capitol Street NW, Blair Road NW, and the Red Line train tracks to the east, Rittenhouse Street NW to the north, and Missouri Avenue NW to the south. Manor Park borders the adjacent neighborhoods of Takoma, Brightwood, Brightwood Park, and Riggs Park neighborhoods. In 1940, the Manor Park Citizens Association deemed the boundaries to be Eighth Street, Whittier Street, North Capitol Street, and Concord Street (now named Missouri Avenue).

Residential and not very suburban, Manor Park is largely characterized by rowhouses, detached and semi-detached houses, and small neighborhood businesses. Many of the homes were built in the 1920s. There are also swaths of park land cutting through the neighborhood, including Fort Slocum Park.

In 1923, the Manor Park Citizens Association formed to improve the neighborhood. Manor Park had mostly dirt roads until at least 1926. For many years, Manor Park was not connected by road to Takoma until Fourth and Fifth Streets were extended to connect the two neighborhoods in 1926.

== Historic places ==
- Fort Slocum (Washington, D.C.)
