= Samuel T. Wellman =

American engineer specialzing in steel

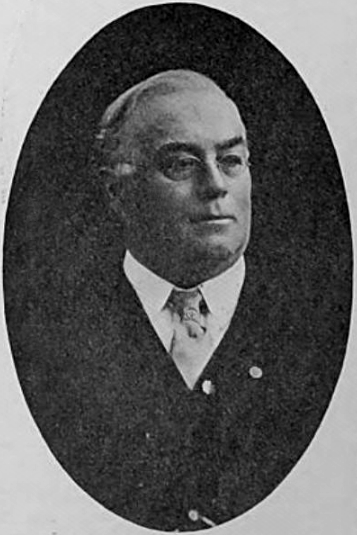
- Born: February 5, 1847; Wareham, Massachusetts, US
- Died: July 11, 1919 (aged 72); Cleveland, Ohio, US

Samuel Thomas Wellman (February 5, 1847 – July 11, 1919) was an American steel industry pioneer, industrialist, and prolific inventor. Charles M. Schwab of Bethlehem Steel described Samuel T. Wellman as "the man who did more than any other living person in the development of steel". Wellman was a close friend of electrical pioneer George Westinghouse, and he was also president of the American Society of Mechanical Engineers from 1901 to 1902.

== Early life ==
Born in Wareham, Massachusetts in 1847, Wellman was the son of a Nashua Iron Company superintendent. Wellman received his formal engineering training from Norwich University in Norwich, Vermont, and served as a corporal with the 1st New Hampshire Heavy Artillery Regiment during the Civil War. Shortly after the war, Wellman married Julia A. Ballard, with whom he had five children.

== Career and influence on the steel industry ==
Wellman began his career working at the Nashua Iron Company. He was encouraged by his father to build a regenerative gas furnace for the company. Wellman did this, impressing Carl Wilhelm Siemens, who immediately hired him to establish the first crucible-steel furnace in America. Wellman went on to improve upon the open-hearth process of steel rail production, which in turn had improved upon the Bessemer process. In 1869, Wellman built the first commercially successful open-hearth furnace in America at the Bay State Iron Works in South Boston.

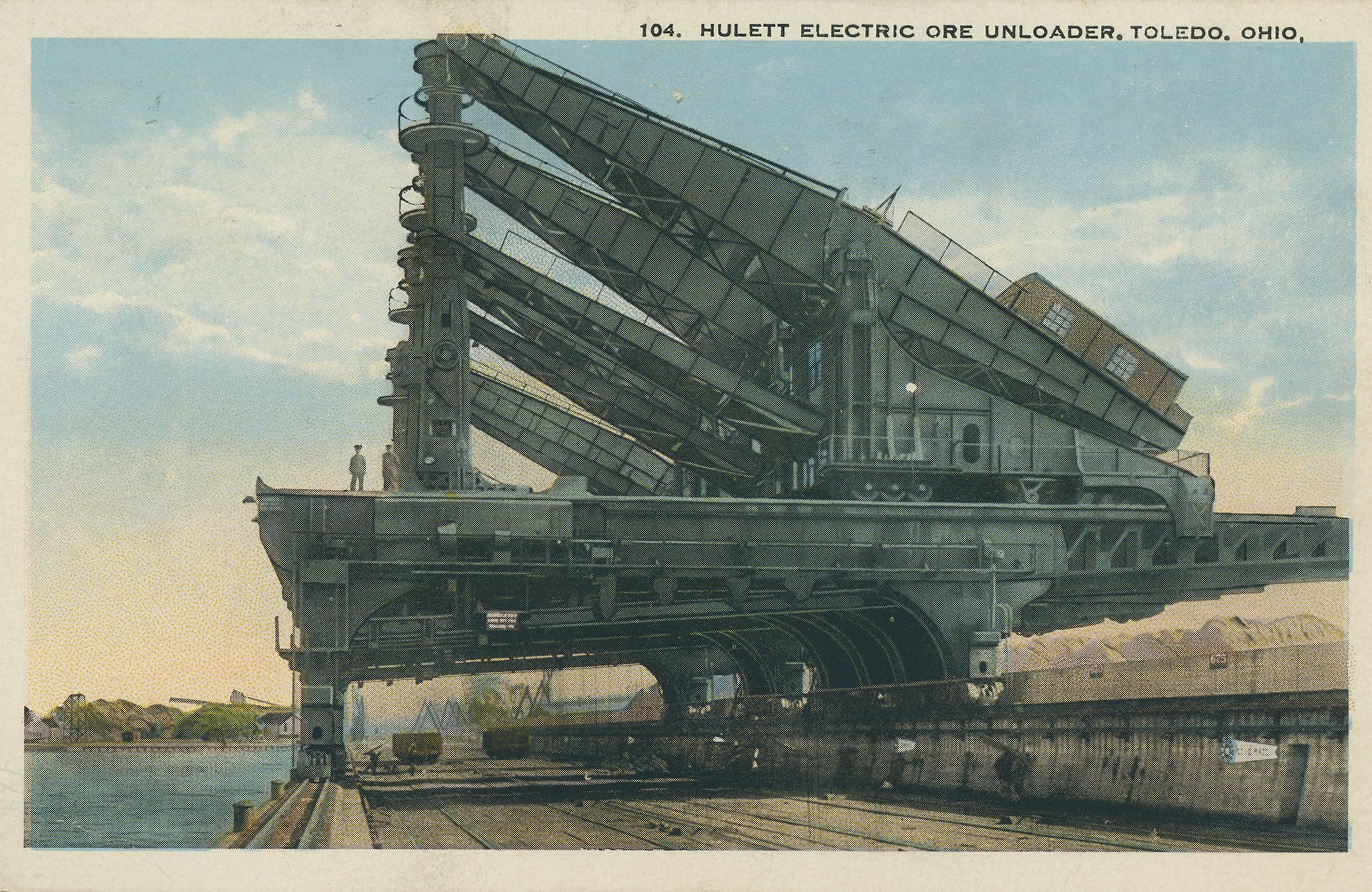
Hulett Electric Ore Unloader, Toledo, Ohio, 1919

Furnaces were not Wellman's only contribution to the steel industry. He was also instrumental in the development of the Hulett unloader, which allowed the unloading of taconite from the iron ore boats of the Great Lakes, particularly on Lake Erie. In addition to improvements on the Hulett unloader, other important inventions include an open hearth charging machine and a hydraulic crane. Following an unsuccessful venture with his half-brother, Wellman later founded the Wellman-Seaver-Morgan Engineering Company in Cleveland, Ohio, which continues under a different name to this day.

== Partial list of inventions ==
- Automatic bail gripping or locking device for electric cranes
- Furnace charging apparatus
- Open hearth steel furnace
- Complete list of patents on Google

== Selected publications ==
- Wellman, S. T., (1902). The early history of open-hearth steel manufacture in the united states. Transactions of the American Society of Mechanical Engineers, 23, 78-98.
- Wellman, S. T., (1916). Iron and steel making. In F. H. Newell & C. E. Drayer, (Eds.), Engineering as a career: A series of papers by eminent engineers, (pp. 81–88). New York: D. Van Nostrand Company.
