= Fort Lincoln (Washington, D.C.) =

- Neighborhood of Washington, D.C.
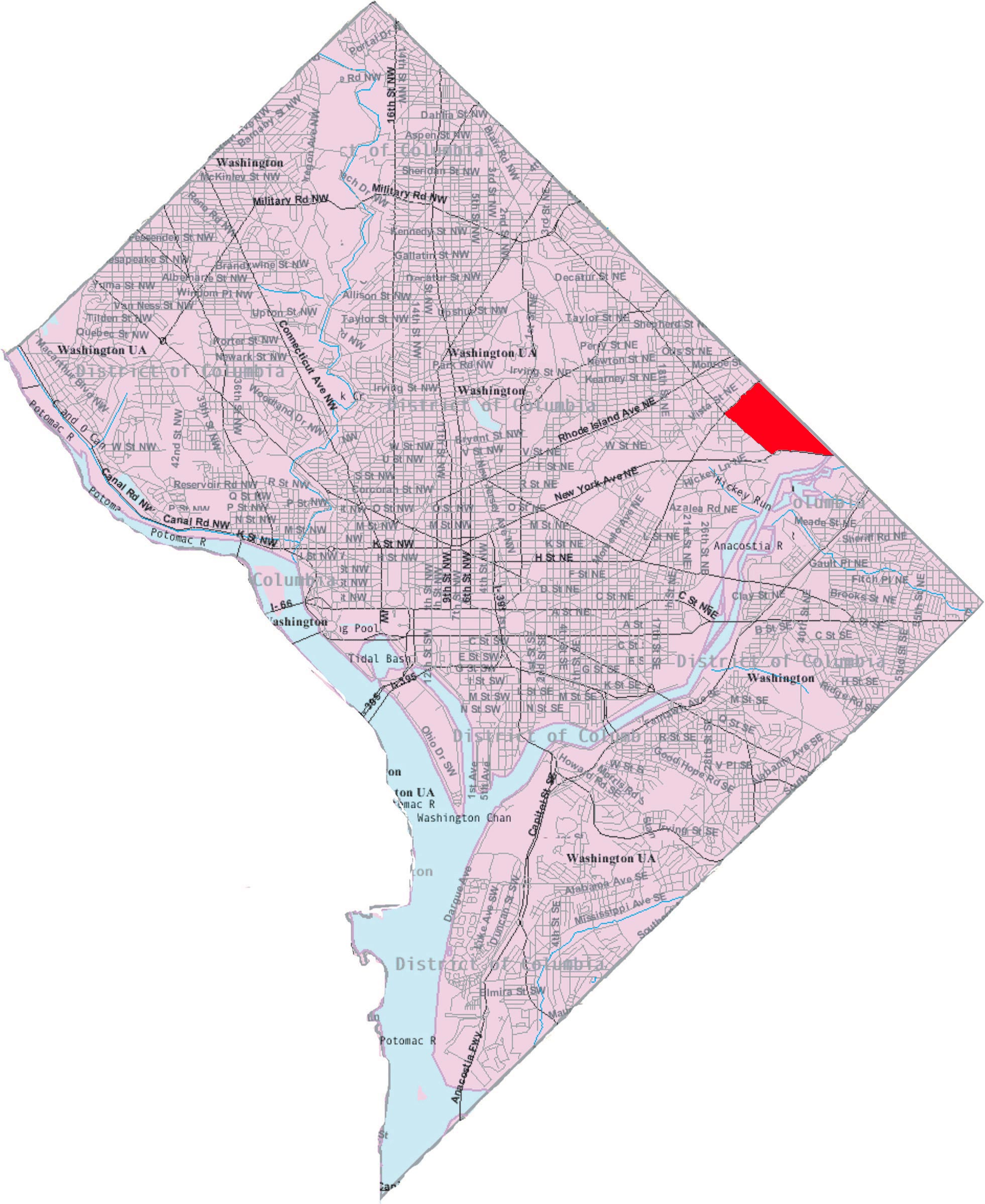
- Fort Lincoln within the District of Columbia
- Country: United States
- District: Washington, D.C.
- Ward: Ward 5

Government
  - Councilmember: Kenyan McDuffie

Area
  - Total: 0.47 sq mi (1.2 km^{2})
- Postal code: ZIP code

Fort Lincoln is a neighborhood located in northeastern Washington, D.C. It is bounded by Bladensburg Road to the northwest, Eastern Avenue to the northeast, New York Avenue NE to the south, and South Dakota Avenue NE to the southwest. The town of Colmar Manor, Maryland, is across Eastern Avenue from the Fort Lincoln neighborhood, as is the Fort Lincoln Cemetery.

The name Fort Lincoln was originally used for a Civil War Fort in adjacent Prince George's County, Maryland, across the D.C. line from the Washington neighborhood bearing its name.

== Neighborhood ==
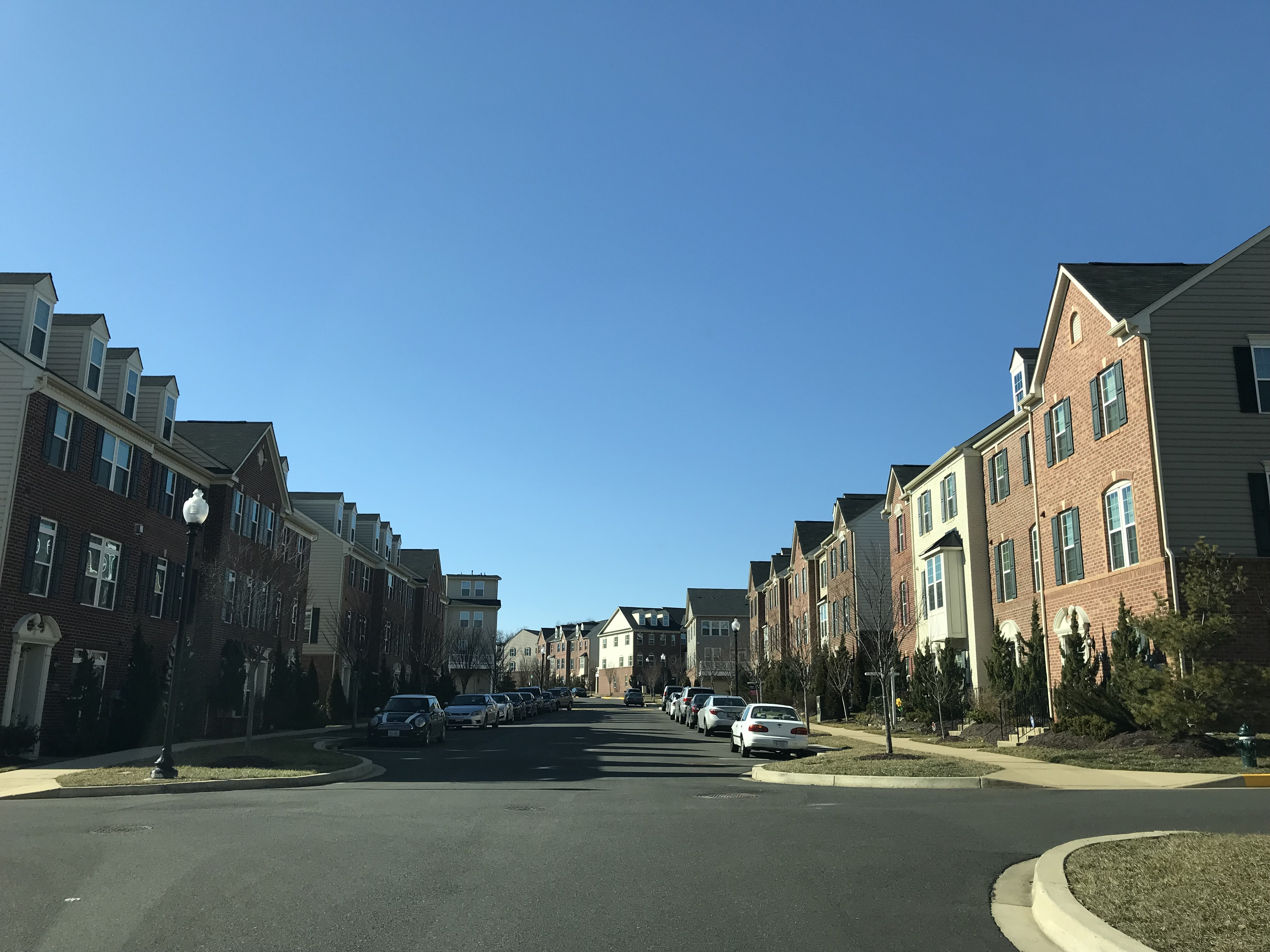
Fort Lincoln neighborhood on Hansberry Ct. NE in February 2019

This northeast Washington neighborhood is home to the Fort Lincoln "New Town" development constructed in the 1960s and 1970s. This neighborhood is currently the home of Cathy Lanier, former Chief of the D.C. Metropolitan Police.

In 2011 another 42 acres of the wetland forest park was sold to make a shopping center. The shopping center includes a Costco store that opened in November 2012.

== War of 1812 battlefield site ==
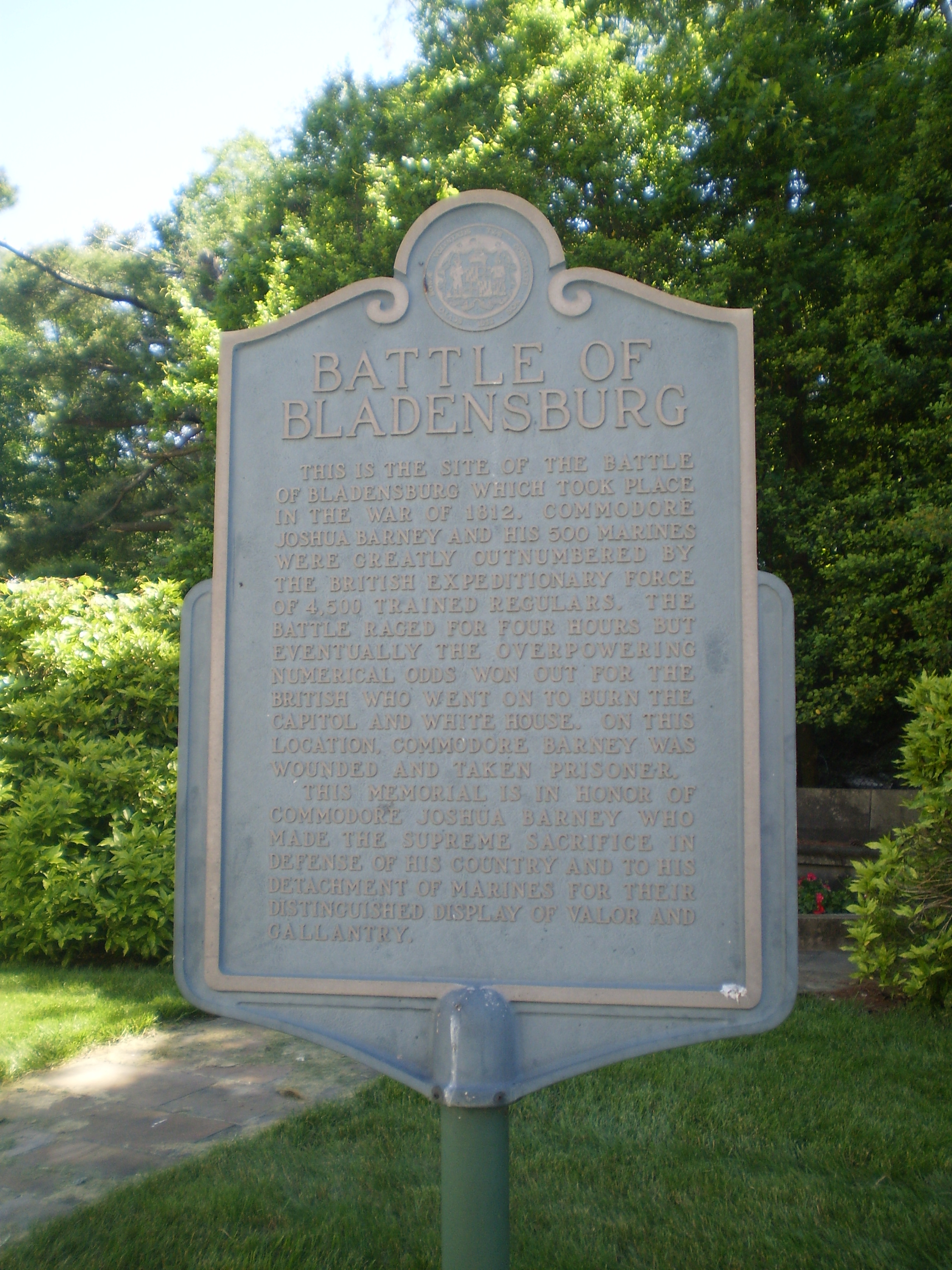
Battle of Bladensburg historical marker inside the entrance Of Fort Lincoln Cemetery detailing the War of 1812 exploits of the last stand in the American defense against the ensuing British advance by the artillery barrage of Commodore Joshua Barney and his Chesapeake Bay Flotilla of sailors and attached marines before being overwhelmed.
