= 150th Ohio Infantry Regiment =

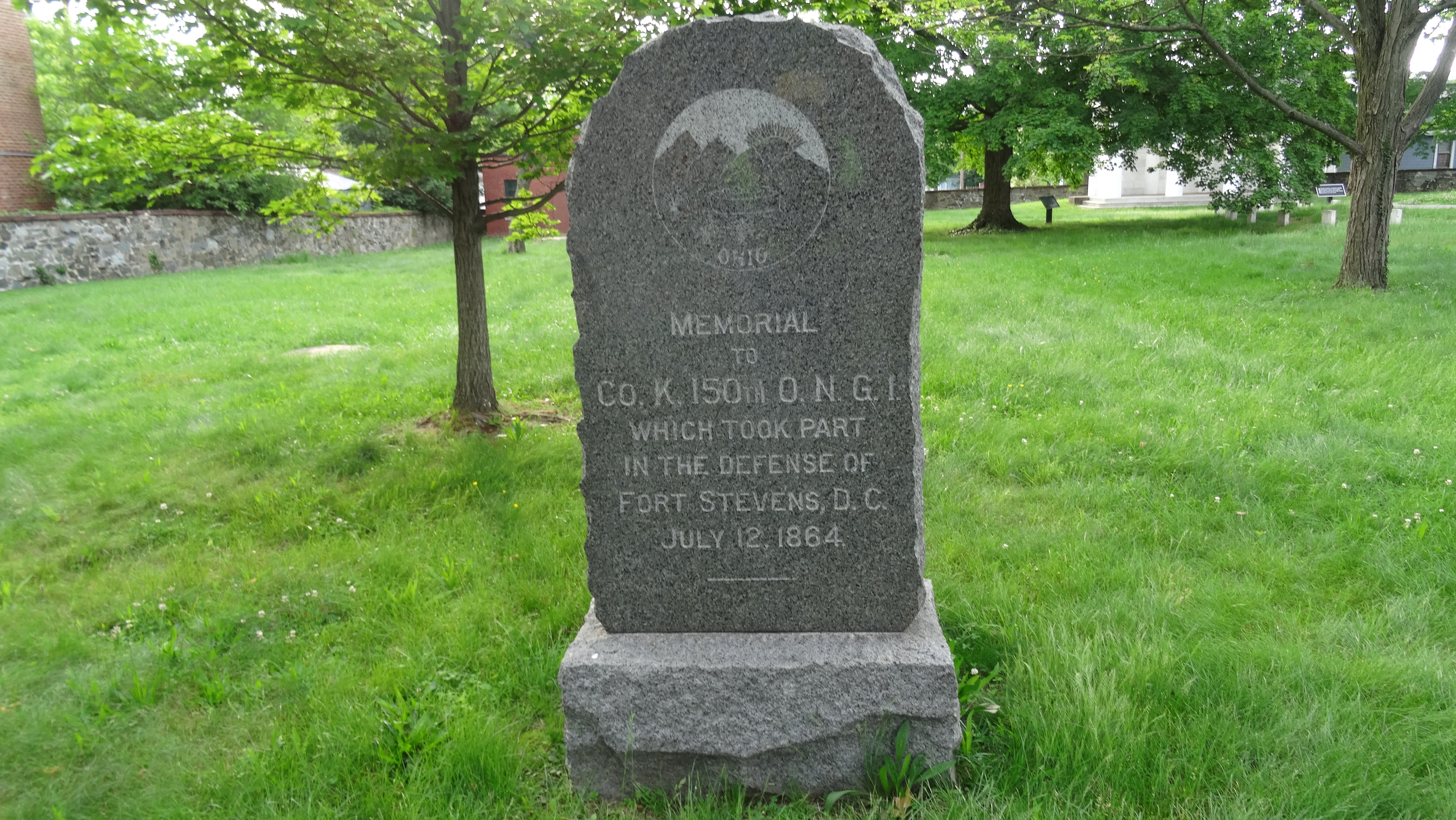
- Memorial to Co K, 150th Ohio Infantry in Battleground National Cemetery, Washington, D.C.
- Active: May 5, 1864, to August 23, 1864
- Country: United States
- Allegiance: Union
- Branch: Union Army
- Type: Infantry
- Engagements: Battle of Fort Stevens

The 150th Ohio Infantry Regiment, sometimes 150th Ohio Volunteer Infantry (or 150th OVI) was an infantry regiment in the Union Army during the American Civil War.

== Service ==
The 150th Ohio Infantry was organized at Camp Taylor near Cleveland, Ohio, and mustered in May 5, 1864, for 100 days service under the command of Colonel William H. Hayward.

The regiment left Ohio for Washington, D.C., May 7, and was assigned to garrison duty at Fort Lincoln, Fort Saratoga, Fort Thayer, Fort Bunker Hill, Fort Slocum, Fort Totten, and Fort Stevens, Defenses of Washington, until August. It was attached to 1st Brigade, Haskins' Division, XXII Corps, to July. 2nd Brigade, Haskins' Division, XXII Corps, to August. Engaged in the repulse of Early's attack on Washington, D.C., July 11–12.

The 150th Ohio Infantry mustered out of service August 23, 1864.

== Ohio National Guard ==
Over 35,000 Ohio National Guardsmen were federalized and organized into regiments for 100 days service in May 1864. Shipped to the Eastern Theater, they were designed to be placed in "safe" rear areas to protect railroads and supply points, thereby freeing regular troops for Lt. Gen. Ulysses S. Grant’s push on the Confederate capital of Richmond, Virginia. As events transpired, many units found themselves in combat, stationed in the path of Confederate Gen. Jubal Early’s veteran Army of the Valley during its famed Valley Campaigns of 1864. Ohio Guard units met the battle-tested foe head on and helped blunt the Confederate offensive thereby saving Washington, D.C. from capture. Ohio National Guard units participated in the battles of Monacacy, Fort Stevens, Harpers Ferry, and in the siege of Petersburg.

== Casualties ==
The regiment lost 12 enlisted men during service; 2 men killed and 10 men due to disease.

== Commanders ==
- Colonel William H. Hayward

== Notable members ==
- Private Robert Maynard Murray, Company D - U.S. Representative from Ohio, 1883-1885

== See also ==
- List of Ohio Civil War units
- Ohio in the Civil War
