= 1st New Hampshire Heavy Artillery Regiment =

- Active: July 22, 1863-June 15, 1865
- Country: United States of America
- Allegiance: Union
- Type: Artillery

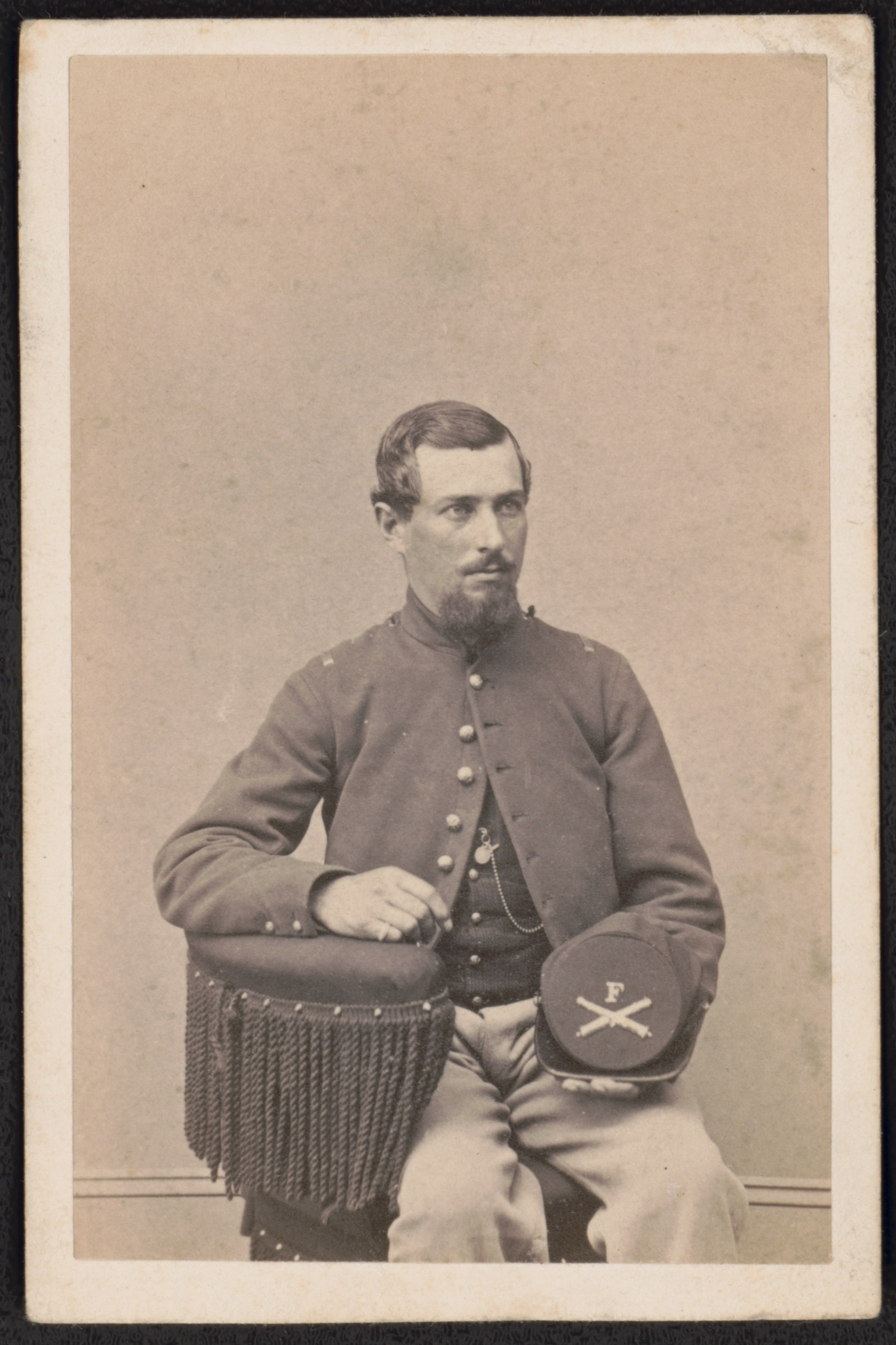
Unidentified soldier from Co. F, 1st New Hampshire Heavy Artillery Regiment. From the Liljenquist Family Collection of Civil War Photographs, Prints and Photographs Division, Library of Congress. Photograph by Mathew Brady

The 1st New Hampshire Heavy Artillery Regiment was an American Civil War regiment, first raised in 1863 for the defenses of Portsmouth Harbor in New Hampshire and Maine. They were later transferred to garrison the numerous fortifications of Washington, D.C.

== History ==
With the 17th New Hampshire Infantry failing to reach regiment strength and its organization halted, Lt Col Charles H Long was commissioned captain of the First Company NH Heavy Artillery Volunteers, ordered by the War Department for use in the defenses of Portsmouth harbor. The men were mustered into service on 22 July 1863, and stationed at Fort Constitution in New Castle. On 17 September 1863, the Second Company was mustered in, and garrisoned Fort McClary in Kittery Point, Maine. They remained at these posts until the following spring when, on 6 May 1864, both companies were ordered to Washington, D.C., for the defense of the capital; detachments of them spread between a dozen forts and batteries. Following this, a third company had begun recruiting in Manchester.

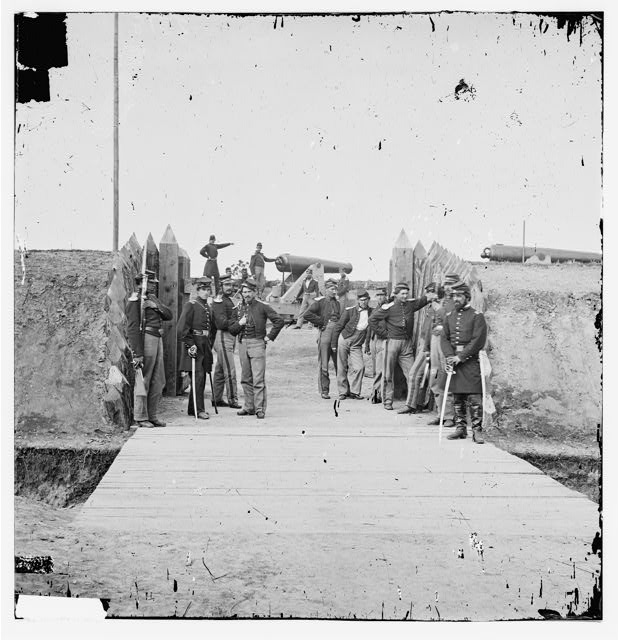
Unnamed heavy artillerymen at Fort Slemmer, Washington, DC

In August 1864, Ira McL. Barton, the captain of Company B, requested further recruits and, with authorization granted to organize a battalion-sized unit, returned to New Hampshire to take part in the raising of an additional four companies. Recruiting within the cities of Nashua, Concord, Laconia and Dover, the number of volunteers exceeded what was needed. The state adjutant applied to the War Department for authority to continue the formation of companies, and by November 1864 nearly had the required number of men to be organized into a proper regiment. To do so, the 1st New Hampshire Light Battery, who had just gone through its reenlistment following the end of a three-year term of service, became "Company M" of the 1st NH Heavy Artillery on 9 November. However, they were soon detached and returned as light artillery in Hancock's II Corps.

As soon as each unit was organized, they were sent to Washington and assigned to different divisions, though seven companies remained together under Lt Col Barton in DeRussey's Division, 3rd Brigade. Col Long was mustered in as the regiment's commander on 16 November and took command of the 1st brigade, Hardin's Division, XXII Corps, on the 21st. While Company A returned to Portsmouth Harbor in November 1864 and Company B did the same the following February, the remainder of the regiment stayed in the vicinity of Washington.

On 15 June 1865, the regiment was mustered out, arriving in New Hampshire on the 19th for final pay and discharge.

== Notable members ==
- Samuel T. Wellman, inventor and steel industry pioneer

== See also ==
- List of New Hampshire Civil War units
- New Hampshire in the American Civil War
