= Stanton Township, Nebraska =

Stanton Township, Nebraska may refer to the following places:

- Stanton Township, Antelope County, Nebraska
- Stanton Township, Fillmore County, Nebraska

See also

- Stanton Township (disambiguation)
