= Staunton Township =

Staunton Township may refer to one of the following places:

In Canada

- Staunton Township, Cochrane District, Ontario (geographic / historical)

In the United States

- Staunton Township, Macoupin County, Illinois
- Staunton Township, Miami County, Ohio

See also

- Staunton (disambiguation)
