= Stanton Township =

Stanton Township may refer to:

- Stanton Township, Champaign County, Illinois
- Stanton Township, Plymouth County, Iowa
- Stanton Township, Linn County, Kansas, in Linn County, Kansas
- Stanton Township, Miami County, Kansas, in Miami County, Kansas
- Stanton Township, Ottawa County, Kansas, in Ottawa County, Kansas
- Stanton Township, Stanton County, Kansas, in Stanton County, Kansas
- Stanton Township, Houghton County, Michigan
- Stanton Township, Goodhue County, Minnesota
- Stanton Township, Antelope County, Nebraska
- Stanton Township, Fillmore County, Nebraska
- Stanton Township, Wilkes County, North Carolina, in Wilkes County, North Carolina

== See also ==
- Stanton (disambiguation)
