= Fort Dupont Park =

Park in Washington, D.C., U.S.

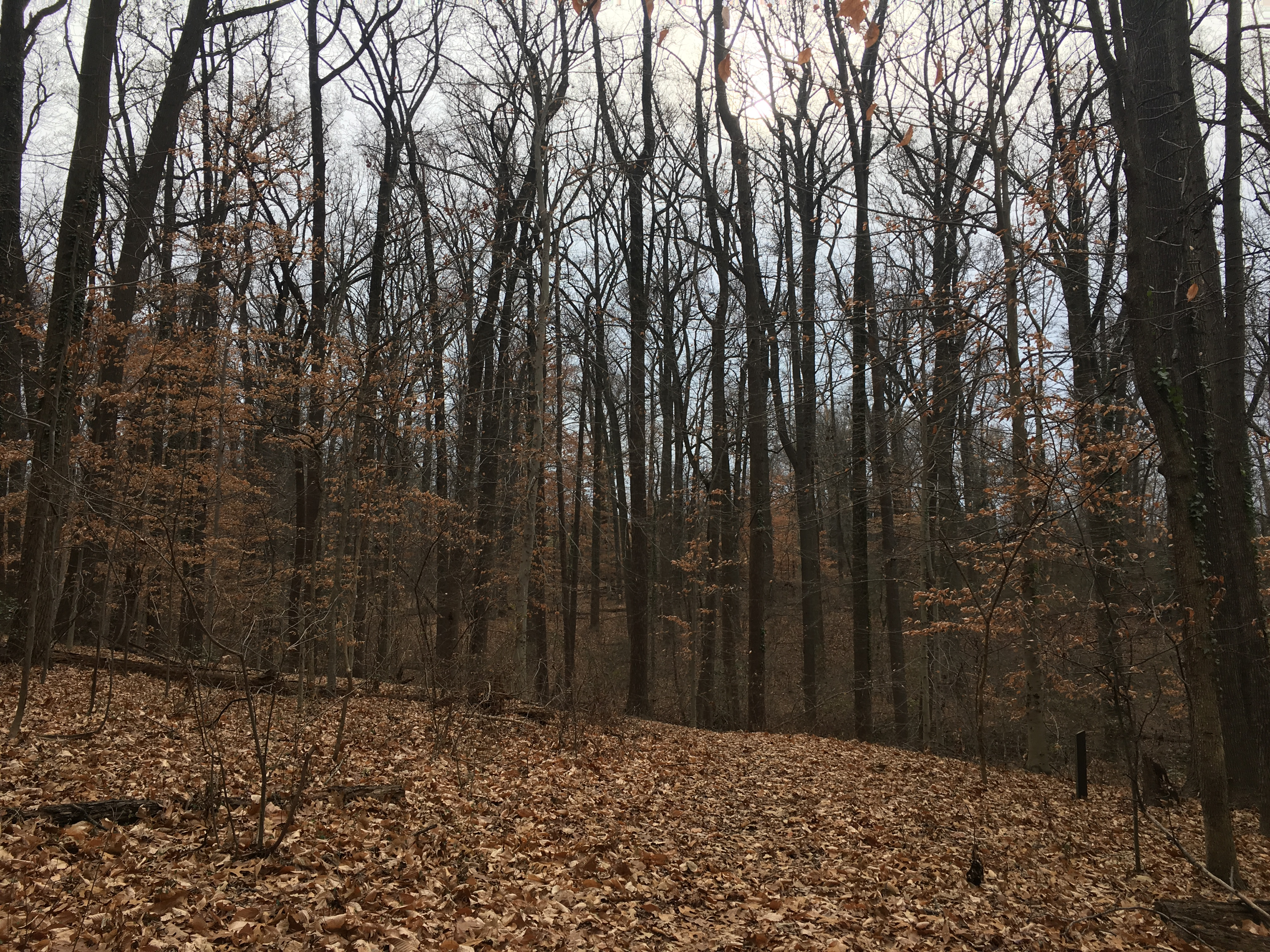
- A view of the woods at the park, December 2017

- Location within District of Columbia
- Location: Washington, D.C.
- Coordinates: 38°52′38″N 76°57′01″W
- Area: 400 acres (160 ha)
- Operator: National Park Service
- Website: www.nps.gov/fodu/index.htm

Fort Dupont Park is a 376-acre (1.52 km^{2}) wooded park under the management of the National Park Service located in Washington, DC. The name of the park comes from the old Civil War earthwork fort that lies within the park. The fort was one of several designed to defend Washington from a Confederate attack during the Civil War. There are few remains of the actual fortifications.

It is one of Washington's largest parks and protects an important sub-watershed of the Anacostia River. The park is a popular place for picnics, nature walks, indoor ice skating, mountain bike riding, gardening, environmental education, music, skating, sports, and ranger-led Civil War programs.

The park was purchased by the National Capital Park and Planning Commission (predecessor of the National Capital Planning Commission) authorized by the Capper-Cramton Act provided along with the other circle parks in the 1930s and '40s.

== Adjacent parks ==
Fort Dupont Park is adjacent to a series of other national and DC parks. Commonly people refer to all of them together as Fort Dupont. These are the adjacent parks:

- US government:
  - Fort Chaplin Park
  - Fort Davis Park
  - Fort Stanton Park
  - Smithsonian Anacostia Community Museum
- DC government:
  - Benning Stoddert Recreation Center
  - Alger Park
  - Fort Battery Ricketts
  - Avalon Playground

== Facilities ==
=== Concert venue ===
Fort Dupont has a 40-year history of offering a summer concert series. Many famous musicians and bands in the Washington, D.C., area have played this venue.

=== Fort Circle Trail ===
The unpaved Fort Circle Hiker-Biker Trail is the primary trail in the park, but there are various side spur trails throughout the parks, totaling about 10 miles (16 km).

The Fort Circle is a 7 mile trail that runs north from the Anacostia Community Museum through the six adjacent Fort Circle Parks (Fort Ricketts Park, Fort Stanton Park, Fort Davis Park, Fort Dupont Park, Fort Chaplin Park and Fort Mahan Park) and several smaller sections of parkland that belong to NPS as part of the Fort Circle Parks, and ends at the north end of Marvin Gaye Park at Hunt Place NE. On the north end it connects to the Marvin Gaye Trail.

The 1902 McMillan Plan envisioned connecting the circle forts with a road called Fort Circle Drive. The New Deal's Civilian Conservation Corps completed a section of the Fort Circle Drive at Fort Dupont, south toward Good Hope Road. Another section was completed near Fort Reno by the Works Progress Administration. Military Drive through Rock Creek - considered a part of the Fort Circle Drive at the time - was completed in the 1950s. No further progress on the Drive was completed, wand by 1962 the idea was abandoned due to changes in the urban environment, right-of-way limitations and traffic on the cross streets.

In 1965, the National Capital Planning Commission (NCPC) released a study that proposed that the Fort Drive be renamed the Fort Park System and the scenic drive concept be abandoned in favor of a Greenway trail connecting the forts. In 1968, the National Park Service (NPS) which had taken jurisdiction over the parks in 1933, issued a master plan for the parks that included the Fort Circle Trail. The Fort Circle Trail was originally envisioned as a 32 mile long network of trails around the Fort Circle but only three sections of the trail were built and two of them are no longer labeled as such. The first section was a four mile section of the C&O Canal towpath from the Foundry Tunnel to Chain Bridge built in 1967 that was to connect Fort Marcy in Virginia with Battery Kemble Park in DC. The second section was a short section in Rock Creek Park along the north side of Military Road – and past Fort DeRussy – that opened in 1968. The Park service first sought funding for 4 1/2 miles (7.2 km) of the Fort Circle Trails in the Fort Dupont area in 1967 as part of its 1968 budget. The first 3,000 feet (910 m) of trail, from Pennsylvania Ave to Ridge Road, was opened on November 10, 1968. The complete east of the river section, from the Fort Rickets area to north of Fort Mahan was dedicated as a national recreation trail, along with the Fort DeRussy section, by Interior Secretary Rogers C. B. Morton in 1971. At that point the trail had already been descoped to 23 miles. The 1968 Fort Circle Parks Master Plan was approved in 1974, but there was no further work on the project.

In 2004, NPS updated its management plan for the parks and chose to replace the completed trail with a guided walking route between them. The bicycle trail was dropped because it would too significantly change the narrow trails that it went through, because the topography was too difficult (requiring bridges, switchbacks and tunnels) and because it would result in a loss of wildness. A 2010 report by the NCPC, NPS and DC called for a similar greenway connection between the forts. None of those plan been implemented.

=== Picnic Areas ===
The park has three picnic areas that are able to reserved for group use. Otherwise, the picnic tables are available through a first come first use basis.

== History ==
Fort Dupont was an earthwork fort built in 1861 as part of the Civil War Defenses of Washington, completed in spring 1862, and in use till 1865 when it was abandoned. The land was owned by Micheal Canton prior to the war and returned to him afterward. The fort was a hexagon with 100-foot-long (30 m) sides; inside was a flag pole, deep well, officer quarters, and barracks, while outside was a guard house. The fort was an artillery installation defending the eastern approaches of Washington.

During the war the following pieces were at the fort:

- 3 - 8 inch howitzers (en embrasure)
- 3 - 24 pounder seacoast guns (en barbette)
- 2 - 6 pounder field guns
- 1 - 24 pounder Coehorn mortar.

Fort Dupont never fired guns in hostile action; however, after the surrender of Confederate forces at Appomattox Court House on April 9, 1865, according to John Longyear, "the Chain of forts around the city and the batteries of field artillery between, made a ring of cannons around the city which were fired for several hours. The line of cannon salutes running round and round the other always proceeding in the same direction, so that it went round and round the circuit 20 to 30 miles".
