= Stanton =

Stanton may refer to:

== Places ==
=== United Kingdom ===
==== East of England ====
- Stanton, Suffolk
- Stanton Chare, Suffolk

==== East Midlands ====
- Stanton, Derbyshire, near Swadlincote
- Stanton by Bridge, Derbyshire
- Stanton by Dale, Derbyshire
- Stanton in Peak, Derbyshire
- Stanton Moor, Derbyshire
- Stanton under Bardon, Leicestershire
- Stanton Hill, Nottinghamshire

==== North East ====
- Stanton, Northumberland

==== South East ====
- Stanton Harcourt, Oxfordshire
- Stanton St John, Oxfordshire

==== South West ====
- Stanton, Gloucestershire
- Stanton Drew, Bristol
- Stanton Prior, Somerset
- Stanton Wick, Somerset
- Stanton Fitzwarren, Wiltshire
- Stanton St Bernard, Wiltshire
- Stanton St Quintin, Wiltshire

==== West Midlands ====
- Stanton, Staffordshire, a village
- Stanton Lacy, Shropshire
- Stanton Long, Shropshire
- Stanton upon Hine Heath, Shropshire

=== United States ===
==== Populated places ====
- Stanton, Arizona
- Stanton, California, the most populous place with the name
- Stanton, Delaware
- Stanton, Iowa
- Stanton, Kansas
- Stanton, Kentucky
- Stanton, Michigan
- Stanton, Mississippi
- Stanton, Missouri
- Stanton, Nebraska
- Stanton, New Jersey
- Stanton, North Dakota
- Stanton, Pennsylvania, a fictional city in Unstoppable (2010 film)
- Stanton, Tennessee
- Stanton, Texas
- Stanton, Dunn County, Wisconsin, a town
- Stanton, Jefferson County, Pennsylvania, an unincorporated community
- Stanton, St. Croix County, Wisconsin, a town
- Stanton (community), Wisconsin, an unincorporated community
- Stanton Heights, Pittsburgh
- Stanton County (disambiguation)
- Stanton Township (disambiguation)

==== Schools ====
- Stanton High School (Texas), public high school in Texas
- Stanton College Preparatory School, public high school in Florida
- Stanton Preparatory Academy, New York school to prepare students for West Point and Annapolis

==== Other ====
- Stanton Airfield, Minnesota
- Stanton Airport, Kentucky
- Stanton Formation, geologic formation in Iowa, Nebraska, Missouri and Kansas
- Stanton Glacier, Montana
- Stanton Park, Washington, D. C.
- Stanton Street, New York City
- Stanton Mountain, Montana
- Stanton Peak, California

=== Other ===
==== Antarctica ====
- Stanton Hills, group of nunataks in Ellsworth Land

== Other ==
- Stanton (surname)
- Stanton Garner, American historian
- Stanton Kidd (born 1992), American basketball player for Hapoel Jerusalem in the Israeli Basketball Premier League
- Stanton C. Pemberton (1858–1944), American businessman and politician
- Stanton T. Friedman (1934–2019), American-Canadian nuclear physicist and UFO writer
- Stanton Catlin (1915-1997), American art historian
- Stanton Magnetics, designer and manufacturer of audio products
- Stanton Sunbird, New Zealand homebuilt motor glider
- Stanton Warriors, UK-based breakbeat group
- Stanton number, a dimensionless number relating fluid heat transfer and thermal capacity.
- USS Stanton, a World War II destroyer escort of the U.S. Navy

== See also ==
- Fort Stanton, New Mexico, United States
- Fort Stanton (Washington, D.C.), a Civil War-era fortification
- Fort Stanton, Washington, D.C., a residential neighborhood near the fort
- New Stanton, Pennsylvania, United States
- St. Anton, Austria
- Staunton (disambiguation)
