= Fort O'Rourke =

Coordinates: 38°47′13.3″N 77°4′23.3″W

- Part of the Civil War defenses of Washington, D.C.
- Fairfax County, Virginia, USA

Site information
- Type: Earthwork fort
- Controlled by: Union Army
- Condition: Stabilized

Site history
- Built: 1862-3
- In use: 1862–1865
- Materials: Earth, timber
- Demolished: 1865
- Battles/wars: American Civil War

Fort O'Rourke is a former Union Army installation now located in the Belle Haven area of Fairfax County in the U.S. state of Virginia. It was the southernmost fort built to defend Washington, D.C. in the American Civil War.

== Occupation of Northern Virginia ==
Following the surrender of Fort Sumter in Charleston, South Carolina, on April 14, 1861, President Abraham Lincoln declared that "an insurrection existed," and called for 75,000 troops to be called up to quash the rebellion. The move sparked resentment in many other southern states, which promptly moved to convene discussions of secession. The Virginia State Convention passed an ordinance of secession and ordered a May 23 referendum to decide whether or not the state should secede from the Union. The U.S. Army responded by creating the Department of Washington, which united all Union troops in the District of Columbia and Maryland under one command.

Brigadier General J.F.K. Mansfield, commander of the Department of Washington, argued that Northern Virginia should be occupied as soon as possible in order to prevent the possibility of the Confederate Army mounting artillery on the hills of Arlington and shelling government buildings in Washington. He also urged the erection of fortifications on the Virginia side of the Potomac River to protect the southern terminuses of the Chain Bridge, Long Bridge, and Aqueduct Bridge. His superiors approved these recommendations, but decided to wait until after Virginia voted for or against secession.

On May 23, 1861, Virginia voted by a margin of 3 to 1 in favor of leaving the Union. That night, U.S. Army troops began crossing the bridges linking Washington, D.C. to Virginia.

=== Taking the high ground ===
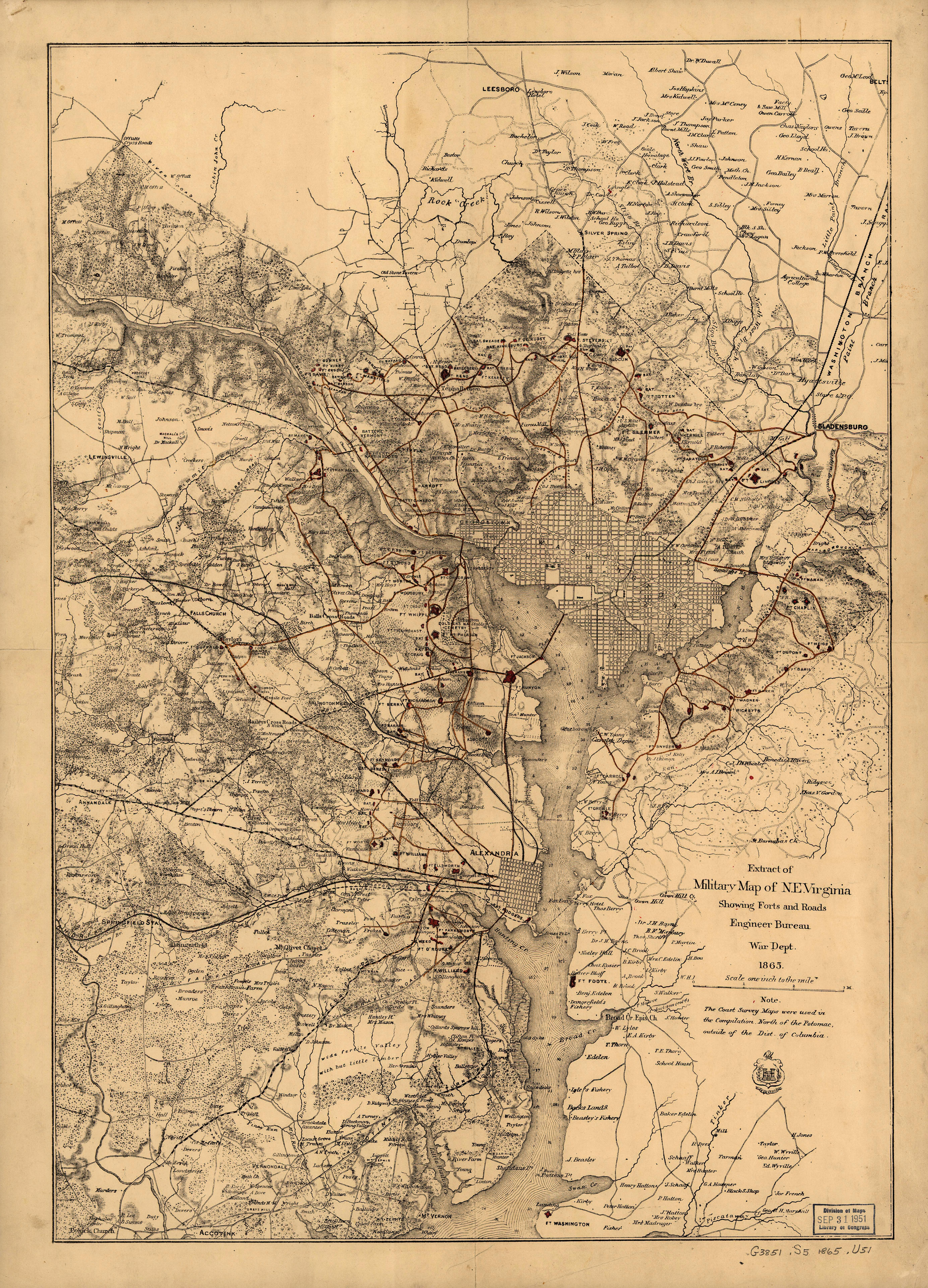
Washington D.C. Fortifications map

Over the seven weeks that followed the occupation of northern Virginia, forts were constructed along the banks of the Potomac River and at the approaches to each of the three major bridges (Chain Bridge, Long Bridge, and Aqueduct Bridge) connecting Virginia to Washington and Georgetown.

While the Potomac River forts were being built, planning and surveying was ordered for an enormous new ring of forts to protect the city. Unlike the fortifications under construction, the new forts would defend the city in all directions, not just the most direct route through Arlington. In mid-July, this work was interrupted by the First Battle of Bull Run. As the Army of Northeastern Virginia marched south to Manassas, the soldiers previously assigned to construction duties marched instead to battle. In the days that followed the Union defeat at Bull Run, panicked efforts were made to defend Washington from what was perceived as an imminent Confederate attack. The makeshift trenches and earthworks that resulted were largely confined to Arlington and the direct approaches to Washington.

On July 26, 1861, five days after the battle, Maj. Gen. George B. McClellan was named commander of the military district of Washington and the subsequently renamed Army of the Potomac. Upon arriving in Washington, McClellan was appalled by the condition of the city's defenses.

In no quarter were the dispositions for defense such as to offer a vigorous resistance to a respectable body of the enemy, either in the position and numbers of the troops or the number and character of the defensive works... not a single defensive work had been commenced on the Maryland side. There was nothing to prevent the enemy shelling the city from heights within easy range, which could be occupied by a hostile column almost without resistance.

To remedy the situation, one of McClellan's first orders upon taking command was to greatly expand the defenses of Washington. At all points of the compass, forts and entrenchments would be constructed in sufficient strength to defeat any attack. Alexandria, which contained the southern terminus of the Chesapeake and Ohio Canal and one of the largest ports in the Chesapeake Bay, was an object of "anxious study."

== Planning and construction ==
Fort O'Rourke was named for Colonel Patrick O'Rourke, killed at Gettysburg. It was constructed during the latter part of 1862 and early 1863 as a redoubt to Fort Lyon. It had a perimeter of 160 yards, with space for 16 guns.

== Remains ==
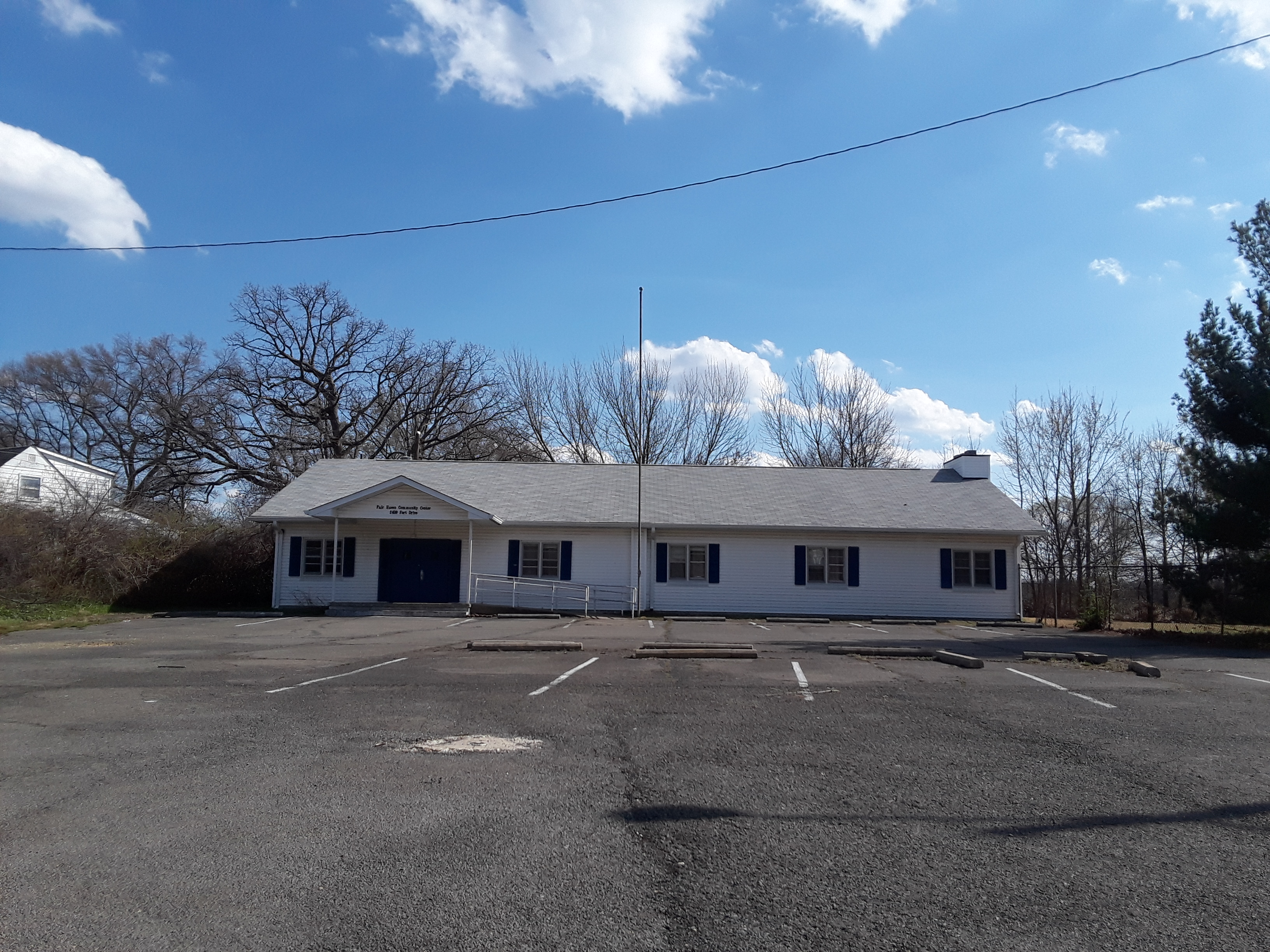
Site of the fort in 2018

The site of the fort is today located at the southeast corner of Fort Drive and Park Place; the grounds are currently occupied by the small neighborhood community center of Fair Haven. No visible remains of the fort can be found.
