= Civil War Defenses of Washington =

- Civil War Fort Sites
- U.S. National Register of Historic Places
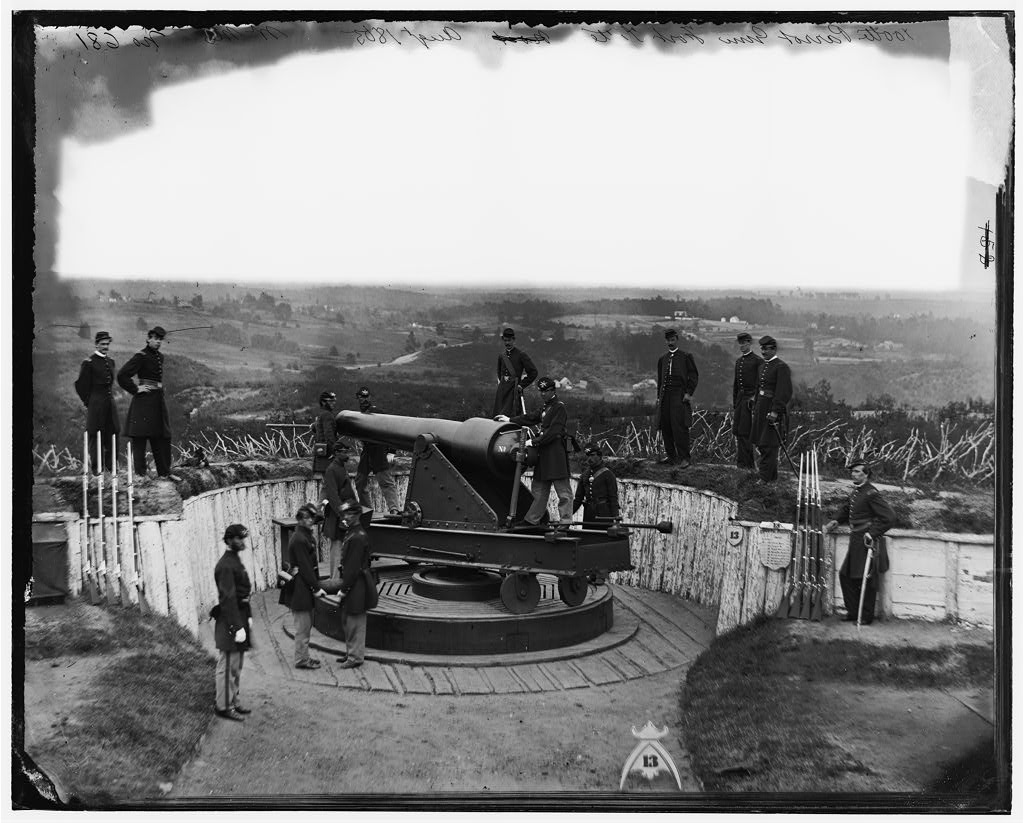
- Union Army soldiers with the 3rd Massachusetts Heavy Artillery Regiment at Fort Totten in Washington, D.C. in August 1865
- Location: Washington, D.C. Northern Virginia; Maryland
- NRHP reference No.: 74000274 (original); 78003439 (increase)

Significant dates
- Added to NRHP: July 15, 1974
- Boundary increase: September 13, 1978

The Civil War Defenses of Washington were a group of Union Army fortifications that protected the federal capital city, Washington, D.C., from invasion by the Confederate States Army during the American Civil War.

Some of these fortifications are part of a grouping of properties now managed by the National Park Service (NPS) and listed on the National Register of Historic Places. Others are parts of state, county, or city parks or are located on privately owned properties. A trail connecting the sites is part of the Potomac Heritage Trail.

Parts of the earthworks of some such fortifications still exist; others have been demolished. A 19.5-mile long trail connecting some of the forts was designated as a National Recreation Trail in 1971.

== History ==
=== Civil War ===
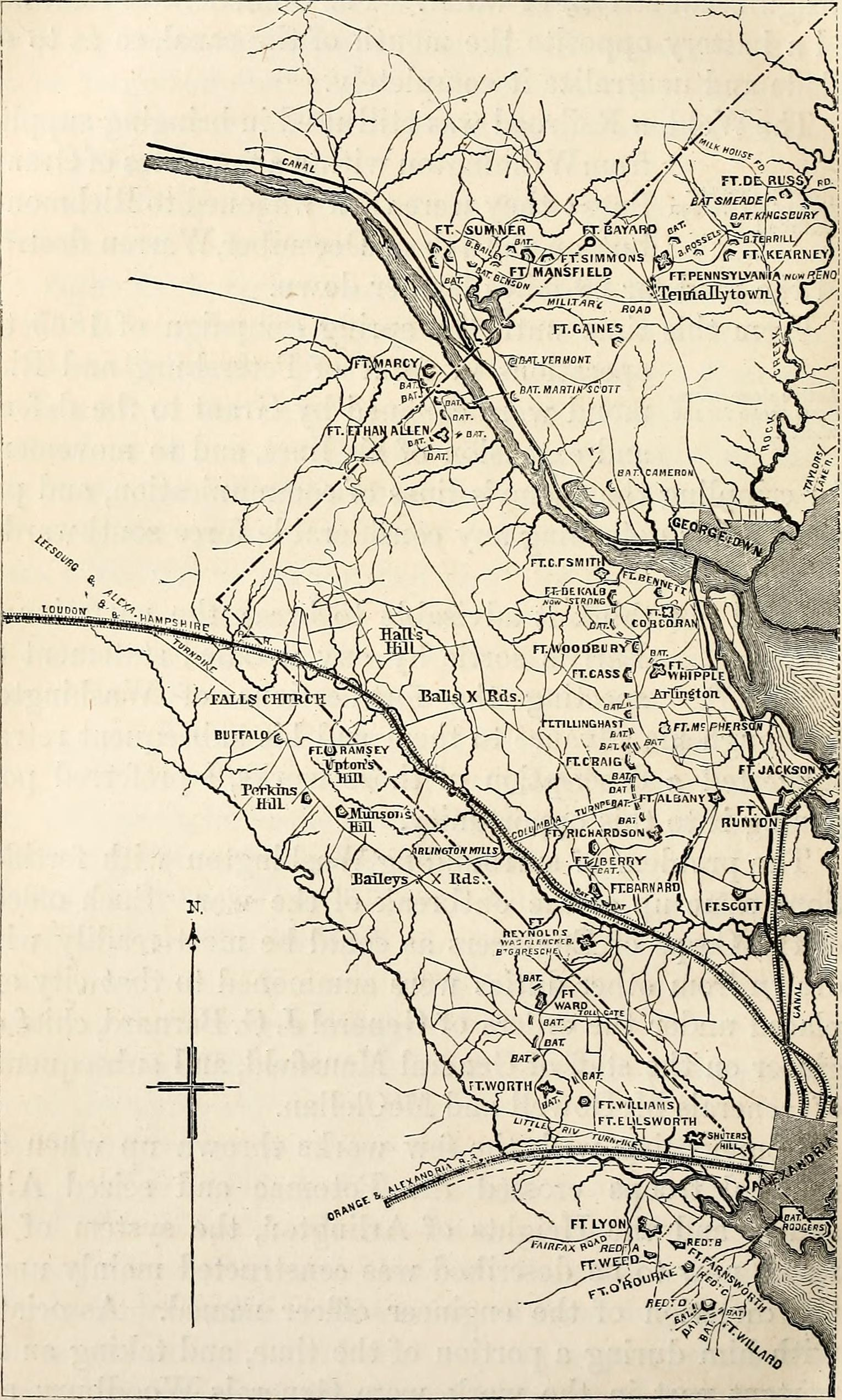
An 1867 map of U.S. military installations in present-day Montgomery County, Maryland, Fairfax County, Virginia, Arlington County, Virginia, and Northwest Washington, D.C. designed to protect the federal capital

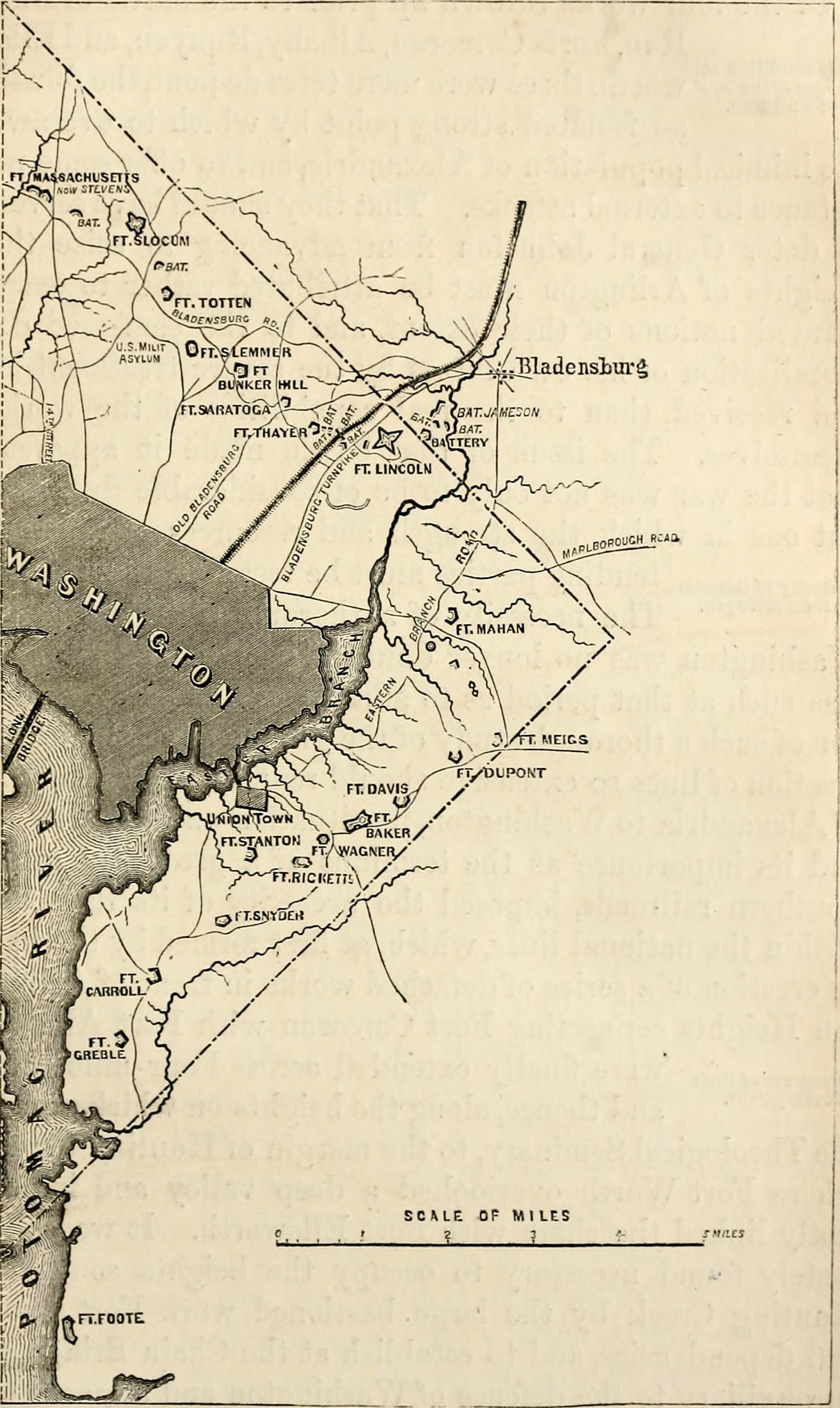
An 1867 map of U.S. military installations east of the federal capital of Washington, D.C.

General map of the defenses of Washington, D.C. from the History of the American Civil War.

During the American Civil War, Union forces built in the Washington, D.C. area, included 68 major enclosed forts used to house soldiers and store artillery and other supplies. They also built 93 prepared but unarmed batteries for field guns and seven blockhouses. There were also 20 miles of rifle pits and 30 miles of connecting military roads. The Confederacy never captured any of these forts, though some came under enemy fire.

Most were built on the limits of the city, which had remained relatively rural. Most of the land was privately owned and taken over by the military at the beginning of the Civil War.

Some examples include:

- Fort Slemmer: A 24-acre plot was owned by Henry Douglas, a florist. Flowers, 1,970 fruit trees, vines, bushes, and other plants were destroyed to complete the fort. This made the land owner unable to work in this trade.
- Fort Reno: The land belonged to Giles and Miles Dyer. The farmhouse was used by the Army as the headquarters for various commands encamped in the area. The fortification covered 20 acres of land. Some 50 more acres were used for barracks, camps, and a parade ground.
- Forts Chaplin and Craven: These forts were built on land belonging to Selby B. Scaggs. He owned a farm there totaling about 400 acres and worth $52,000. Four laborers also lived there. According to the 1860 Census Slave Schedule, Scaggs was also an enslaver of 16 people. (Note: From the 1860 US Federal Census for the District of Columbia.)
- Fort DeRussy: The fort was built on land owned by Bernard S. Swart, a clerk. He lived there with his wife, three children and two farmhands. Today his land is part of Rock Creek Park.
- Fort DuPont: The fort was built on the land owned by 60-year-old Michael Caton, worth $5,000 in 1860. He lived there with his wife, five children (aged 18 to 30), and one domestic worker.
- Fort Slocum: The fort was in part built on the land owned by John F. Callan, also a clerk. He lived there with his wife and their eight children (aged 8 to 24).
- Fort Bayard: The fort was built on land belonging to a farmer named Philip J. Buckey, who lived there with his wife, four children and two servants.
- Battery Kemble and part of Fort Gaines: The land was owned by William A.T. Maddox, a U.S. Marine Corps captain stationed in Philadelphia.
- Fort Stevens: The land belonged to Emory Methodist Church. Some land may have belonged to Elizabeth Thomas, a free black woman. Her house was demolished in the process. Documentation for her ownership was never discovered but the story has become part of the local folklore.

The forts in the District of Columbia were temporary structures. They were in most part built of earthen embankments, timber with limited masonry and were surrounded by trenches and flanked with abatis. They were not designed to serve beyond the Civil War as the land was intended to be returned to its owners at that time.

Most of these owners lost possession of their land for the duration of the war and were unable to receive income from it. Only a few received compensation or rent from the land during the war.

=== Development of the "Fort Circle" ===
An 1898 map of Fort Drive

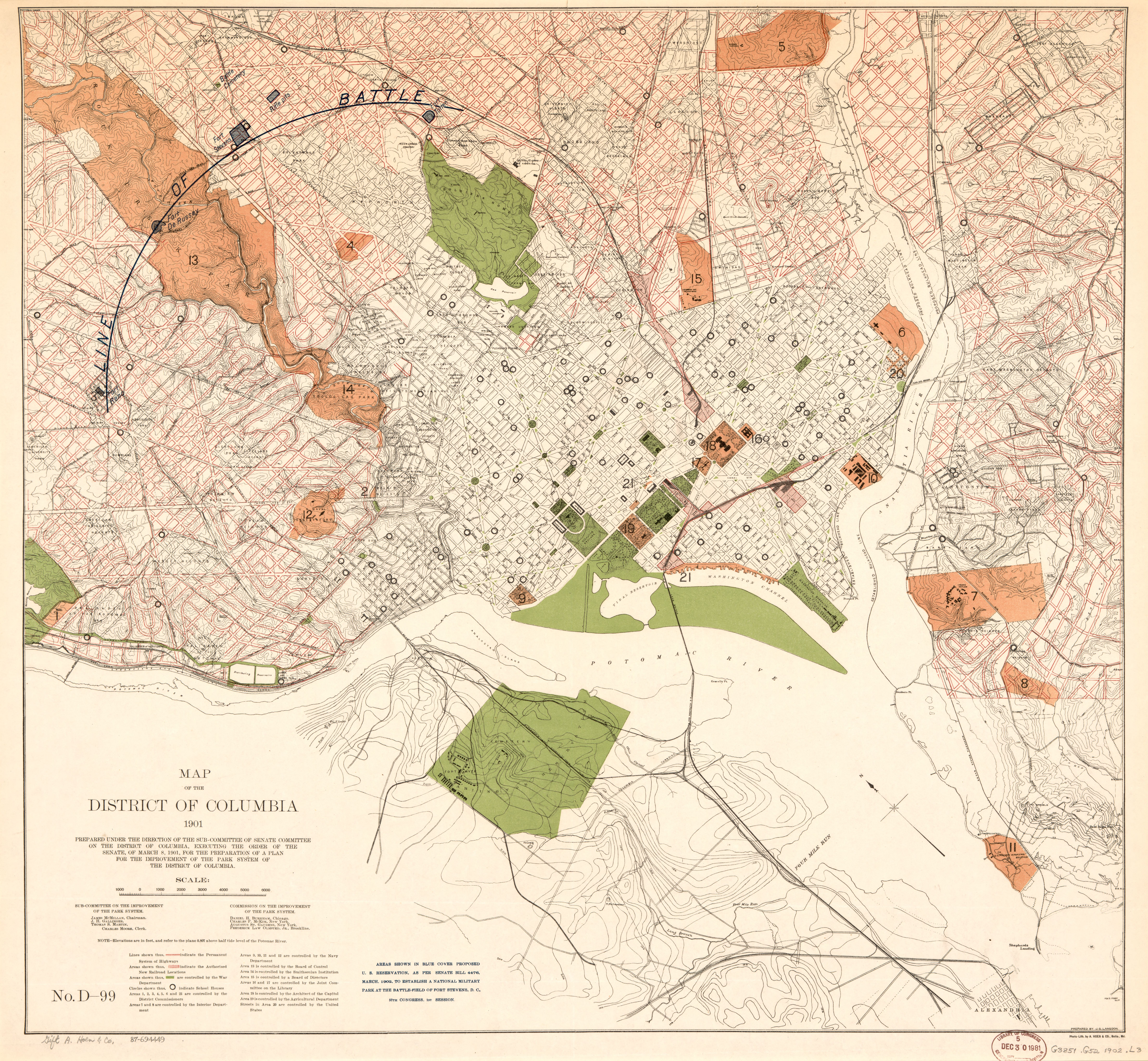
A 1901 map reviewed by the Sub-Committee on the Improvement of the Park System

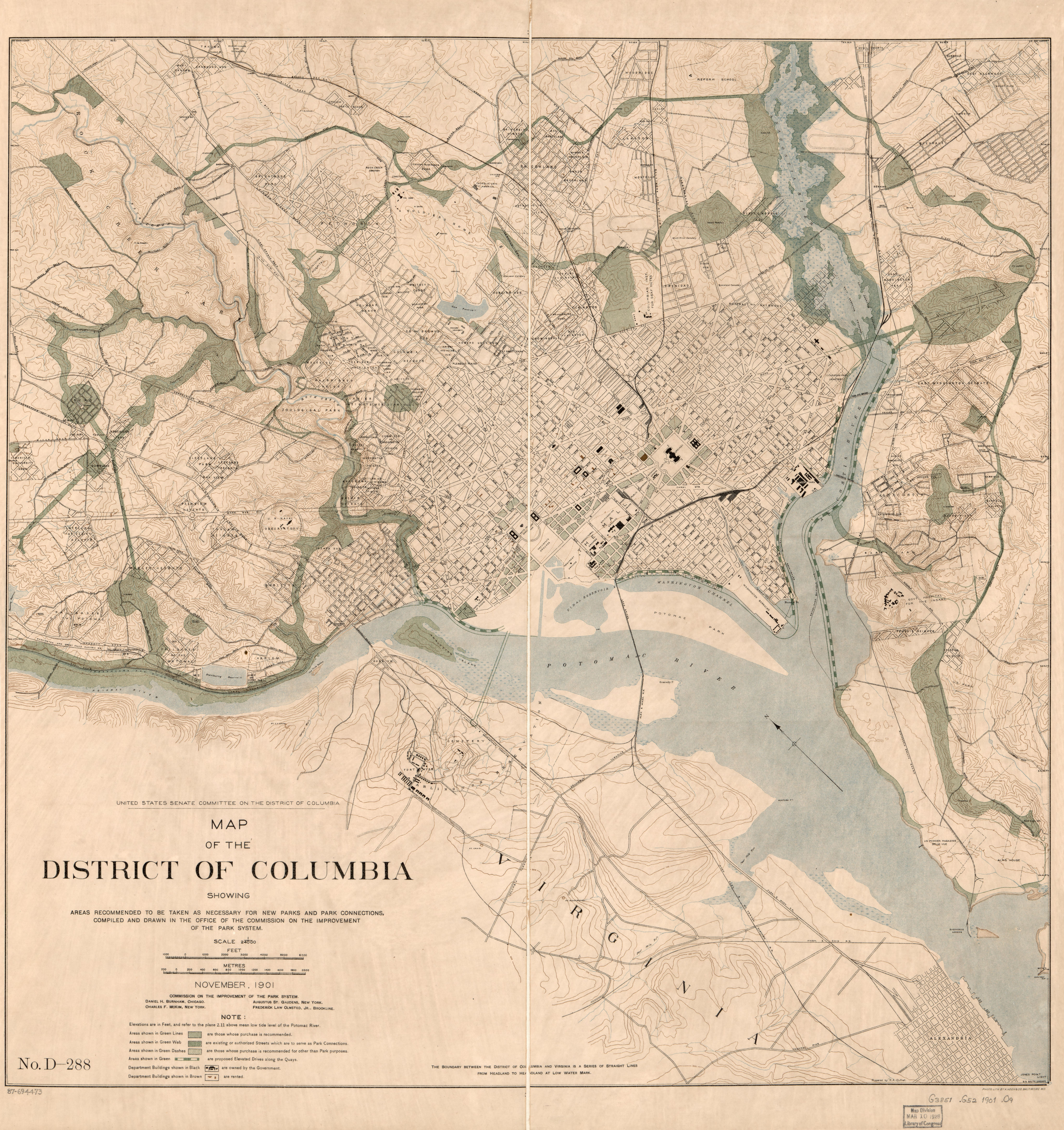
A 1901 map with recommendations for new parks and park connections

In 1898, an interest in connecting the forts by a road was proposed. Known as the Fort Drive, it would connect all the forts from the east of the city to the west.

In 1919 the Commissioners of the District of Columbia pushed Congress to pass a bill to consolidate the aging forts into a "Fort Circle" system of parks that would ring the growing city of Washington. As envisioned by the Commissioners, the Fort Circle would be a green ring of parks outside the city, owned by the government, and connected by a "Fort Drive" road in order to allow Washington's citizens to easily escape the confines of the capital. However, the bill allowing for the purchase of the former forts, which had been turned back over to private ownership after the war, failed to pass both the House of Representatives and Senate.

Despite that failure, in 1925 a similar bill passed both the House and Senate, which allowed for the creation of the National Capital Parks Commission (NCPC) to oversee the construction of a Fort Circle of parks similar to that proposed in 1919. The NCPC was authorized to begin purchasing land occupied by the old forts, much of which had been turned over to private ownership following the war. Records indicate that the site of Fort Stanton was purchased for a total of $56,000 in 1926. The duty of purchasing land and constructing the fort parks changed hands several times throughout the 1920s and 1930s, eventually culminating with the Department of the Interior and the National Park Service taking control of the project in the 1940s.

During the Great Depression, crews from the Civilian Conservation Corps embarked on projects to improve and maintain the parks, which were still under the control of District authority at that time. At Fort Stanton, CCC members trimmed trees and cleared brush, as well as maintaining and constructing park buildings. Various non-park buildings were also discussed for the land. The City Department of Education proposed building a school on park land, while authorities from the local water utility suggested the construction of a water tower would be suitable for the tall hills of the park. The Second World War interrupted these plans, and post-war budget cuts instituted by President Harry S. Truman postponed the construction of the Fort Drive once more. Though land for the parks had mostly been purchased, construction of the ring road connecting them was pushed back again and again. Other projects managed to find funding, however. In 1949, President Truman approved a supplemental appropriation request of $175,000 to construct "a swimming pool and associated facilities" at Fort Stanton Park.

In 1963, when President John F. Kennedy began pushing Congress to finally build the Fort Circle Drive, many in Washington and the National Park Service were openly questioning whether the plan had outgrown its usefulness. By this time, Washington, D.C. had grown past the ring of forts that had protected it a century earlier, and city surface roads already connected the parks, albeit not in as linear a route as envisioned. The plan to link the fort parks via a grand drive was quietly dropped in the years that followed and replaced by a plan to instead build a Fort Circle Trail.

=== Administration ===
The National Capital Parks-East unit of the National Park Service administers Forts Foote, Greble, Stanton, Ricketts, Davis, Dupont, Chaplin, Mahan and Battery Carroll in the District of Columbia and Maryland. The Rock Creek Park unit administers Forts Bunker Hill, Totten, Slocum, Stevens, DeRussy, Reno, Bayard, Battery Kemble and Battleground National Cemetery in the District of Columbia. The George Washington Memorial Parkway administers Fort Marcy in Virginia.

In 2024 legislation was proposed that would reorganize the forts into a national historical park, though the National Park Service opposed changes to the existing administration.

== Fortifications ==
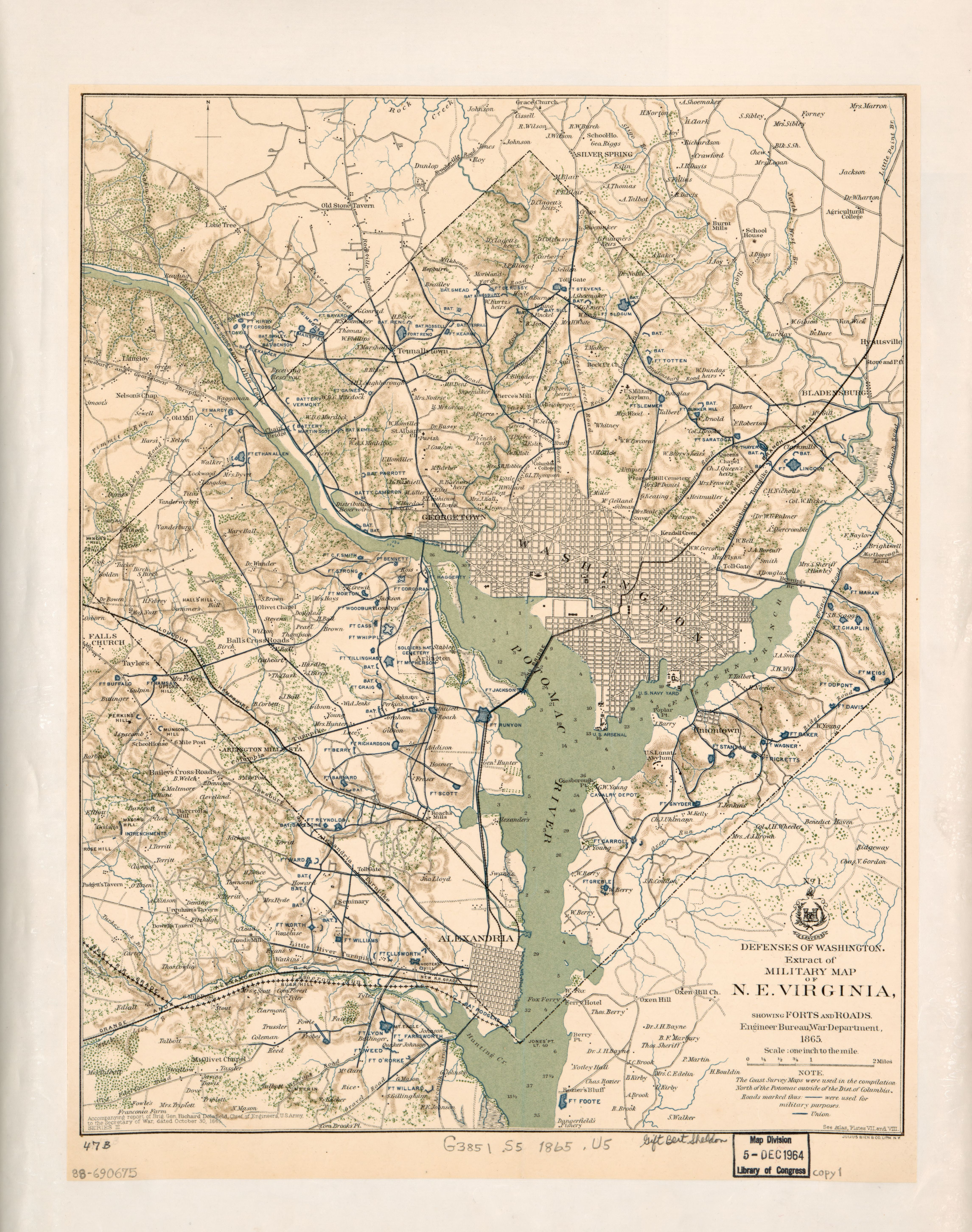
An 1865 map of American Civil War defenses of the national capital of Washington, D.C., including forts, roads, and railroads

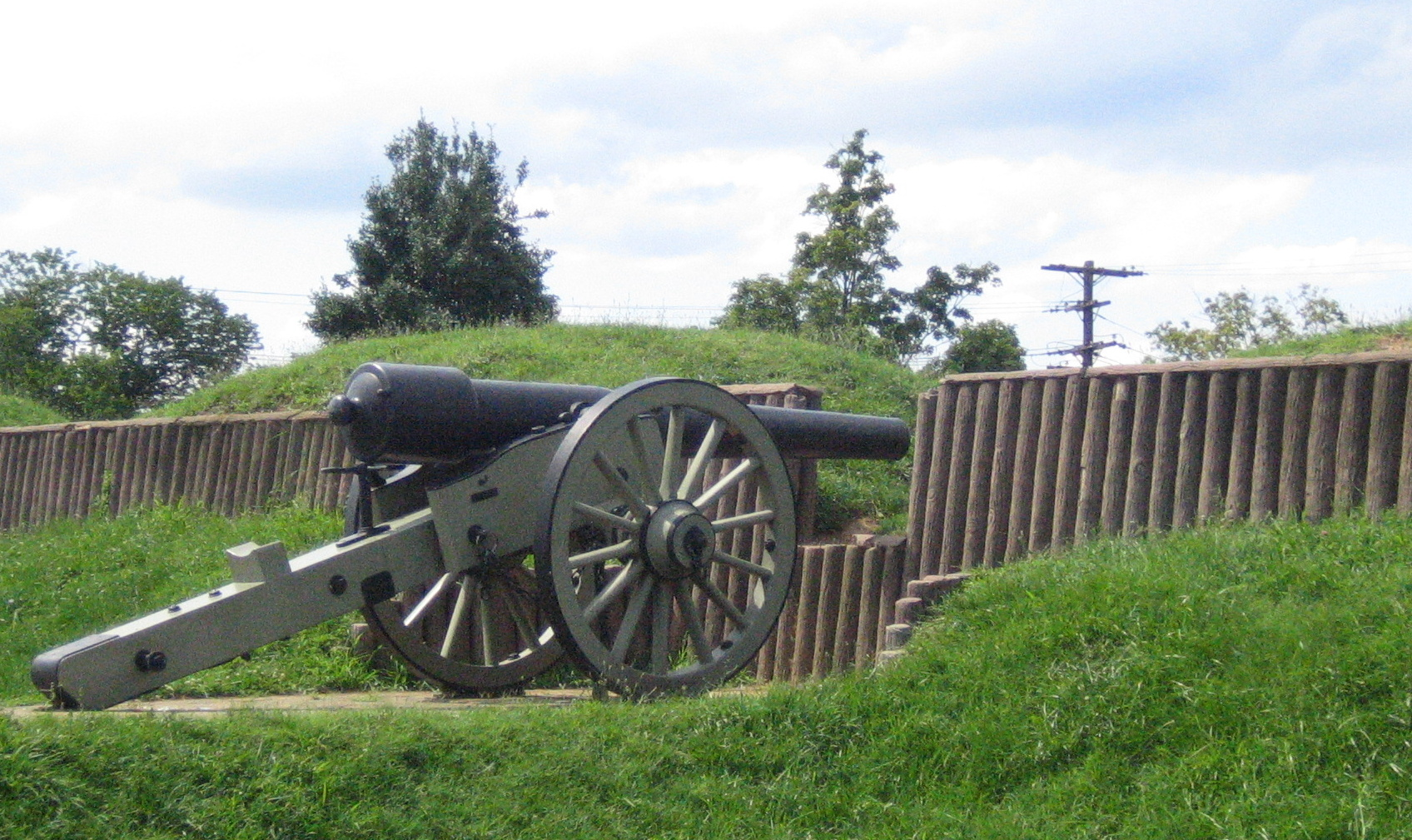
Fort Stevens in 2006

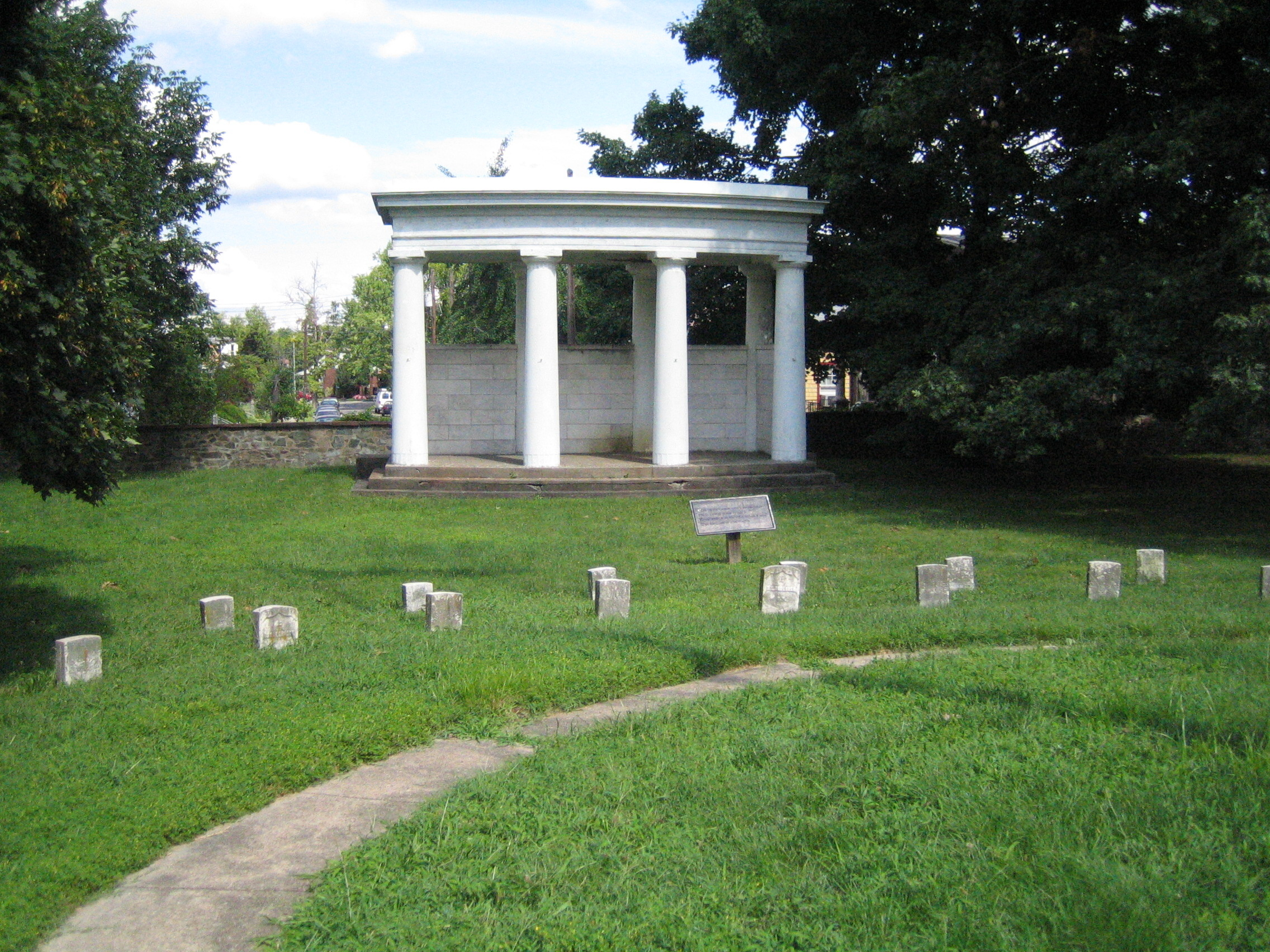
Battleground National Cemetery

The 1865 map shows the following fortifications, some of which no longer exist. Forts in italic type are included in the National Register of Historic Places listing.

=== Northwest Quadrant ===
- Fort Cross (MD)
- Fort Kirby (MD)
- Fort Sumner (MD)
- Battery Alexander (MD)
- Fort Simmons (MD)
- Fort Davis (MD)
- Battery Benson (MD)
- Battery Bailey (MD)
- Fort Mansfield (MD)
- Battery Cameron 38°54′56.3″N 77°05′19.7″W
- Battery Parrott 38°55′14.0″N 77°05′25.8″W
- Battery Kemble 38°55′49.4″N 77°05′46.8″W
- Battery Martin Scott 38°55′49.6″N 77°06′40.1″W
- Battery Vermont 38°56′15.0″N 77°06′40.0″W
- Fort Bayard 38°57′18.7″N 77°05′29.4″W
- Fort Gaines
- Fort Reno 38°57′10.2″N 77°04′41.9″W
- Battery Rossell
- Fort Kearny
- Battery Terrill
- Battery Smead
- Battery Kingsbury
- Fort De Russy 38°57′48.7″N 77°03′04.1″W
- Battery Sill
- Fort Stevens 38°57′50.2″N 77°01′46″W

=== Northeast Quadrant ===
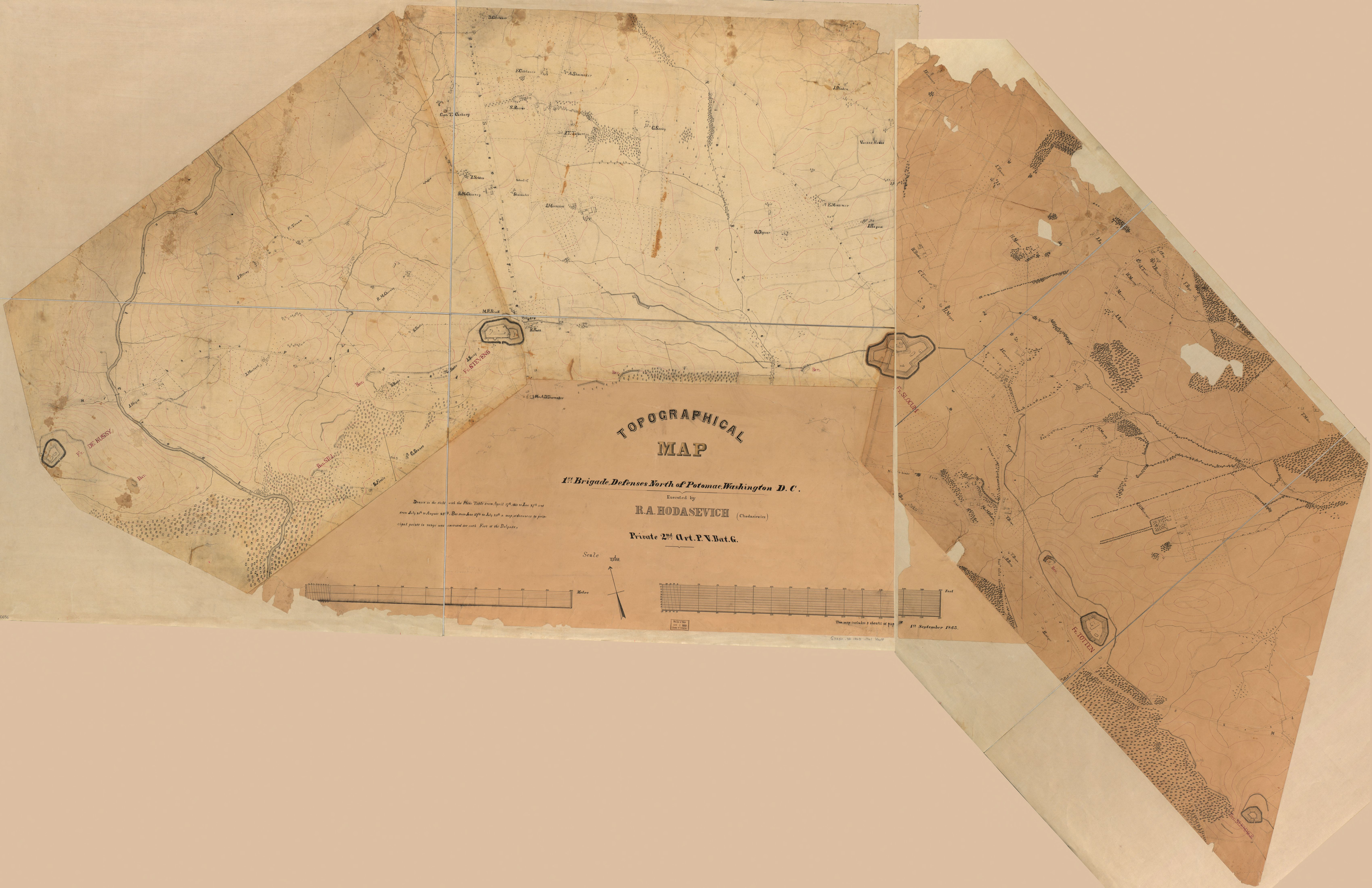
An 1863 map showing the Northeast Quadrant forts (West Side)

An 1863 map showing the Northeast Quadrant forts (East Side)

- Fort Slocum 38°57′36.7″N 77°00′38.9″W
- Fort Totten 38°56′51.8″N 77°00′18.5″W
- Fort Slemmer 38°56′23.0″N 77°00′05.0″W
- Fort Bunker Hill 38°56′08″N 76°59′15″W
- Fort Saratoga 38°55′47.3″N 76°58′43.3″W
- Fort Thayer 38°55′42.5″N 76°58′16.5″W
- Fort Lincoln 38°55′31″N 76°57′04″W

=== Eastern Branch ===
- Fort Mahan 38°53′42.6″N 76°56′41.6″W
- Fort Chaplin 38°53′19″N 76°56′34″W
- Fort Meigs
- Fort Dupont 38°52′22.1″N 76°56′26.3″W
- Fort Davis 38°51′59.6″N 76°57′06.7″W
- Fort Baker
- Fort Wagner
- Fort Ricketts 38°51′24.5″N 76°58′32.8″W
- Fort Stanton 38°51′29.5″N 76°58′54.9″W
- Fort Snyder
- Fort Carroll 38°50′16.4″N 77°00′24.7″W
- Fort Greble 38°49′32.8″N 77°00′55.8″W

=== Potomac Approaches ===
- Fort Foote, MD 38°46′0.1″N 77°01′40.1″W
- Battery Rogers, VA 38°47′42.6″N 77°2′35.88″W
- Fort Washington, MD38°42′39″N 77°01′59″W

=== Arlington Line – Virginia ===
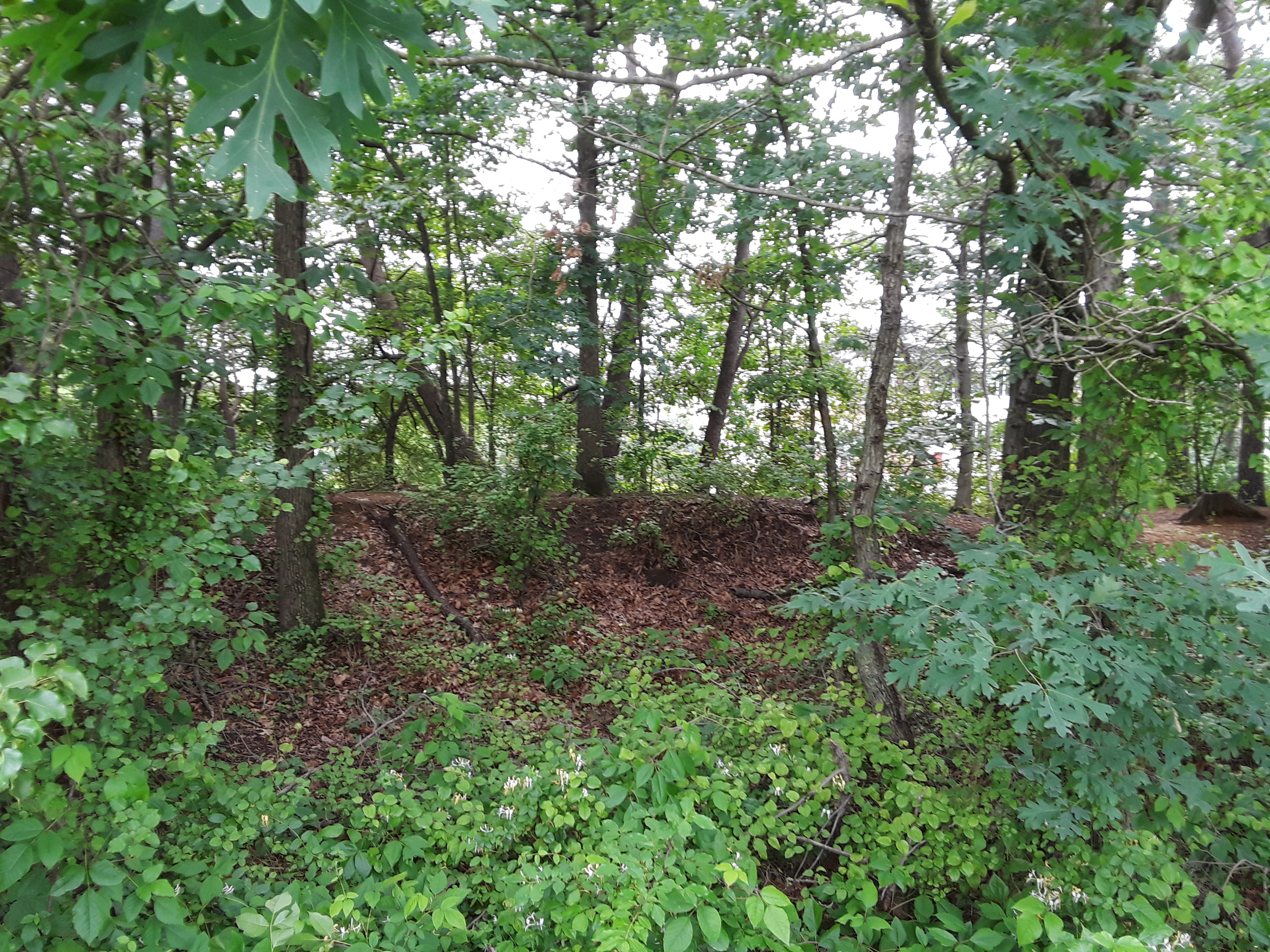
Remains of connections between Fort O'Rourke and Fort Farnsworth still visible in the Huntington area of Fairfax County, Virginia

From North to South:

- Fort Marcy 38°56′2.4″N 77°07′33.6″W
- Fort Ethan Allen
- Fort C. F. Smith
- Fort Bennett
- Fort Strong (formerly Fort DeKalb)
- Fort Corcoran
- Fort Haggerty
- Fort Morton
- Fort Woodbury
- Fort Cass (later within Fort Myer)
- Fort Whipple (later within Fort Myer)
- Fort Tillinghast
- Fort McPherson
- Fort Buffalo
- Fort Ramsay
- Fort Craig
- Fort Albany
- Fort Jackson
- Fort Runyon
- Fort Richardson
- Fort Barnard
- Fort Berry
- Fort Scott
- Battery Garesche
- Fort Reynolds
- Fort Ward
- Fort Worth
- Fort Williams
- Fort Ellsworth
- Fort Lyon
- Fort Farnsworth
- Fort Weed
- Fort O'Rourke
- Fort Willard

== See also ==
- Field artillery in the American Civil War
- List of forts in the United States
- Parrott rifle
- Seacoast defense in the United States (Fort Washington, Fort Foote, and Battery Rodgers)
- Siege artillery in the American Civil War
