= Staunton =

Staunton may refer to:

== Places ==
=== Hong Kong ===
- Staunton Street on Hong Kong Island

=== United Kingdom ===
- Staunton (near Coleford), a village in the west part of the Forest of Dean, Gloucestershire
- Staunton (near Gloucester), a village in Gloucestershire, near the border with Worcestershire
- Staunton, Nottinghamshire
- Staunton on Arrow, Herefordshire
- Staunton on Wye, Herefordshire

=== United States ===
- Staunton, Illinois, a city
- Staunton Township, Illinois, a township
- Staunton, Indiana, a town
- Staunton, Ohio, an unincorporated community
- Staunton Township, Ohio, a township
- Staunton, Virginia, a city
- Staunton Natural Area, a protected area of Staunton State Park, Colorado
- Staunton State Park, Colorado
- Staunton River, a portion of the Roanoke River in central Virginia

== Other uses ==
- Staunton (surname), including a list of people with the name
- Staunton chess set, a set of chessmen

== See also ==
- Stanton (disambiguation)
- Saunton, a village in Devon, England
- Taunton, a town in Somerset, England
