= Stanton Township, Antelope County, Nebraska =

Stanton Township
- Township
- Location in Antelope County
- Coordinates: 42°03′10″N 098°13′44″W
- Country: United States
- State: Nebraska
- County: Antelope

Area
  - Total: 35.46 sq mi (91.83 km^{2})
  - Land: 35.46 sq mi (91.83 km^{2})
  - Water: 0 sq mi (0 km^{2}) 0%
- Elevation: 2,000 ft (600 m)

Population (2010)
  - Total: 68
  - Density: 1.8/sq mi (0.7/km^{2})
- GNIS feature ID: 0838270

Stanton Township is one of twenty-four townships in Antelope County, Nebraska, United States. The population was 68 at the 2010 census.

== See also ==
- County government in Nebraska
