= Stanton Township, Fillmore County, Nebraska =

Stanton Township
- Township
- Location in Fillmore County
- Coordinates: 40°28′48″N 097°39′00″W
- Country: United States
- State: Nebraska
- County: Fillmore

Area
  - Total: 35.90 sq mi (92.99 km^{2})
  - Land: 35.88 sq mi (92.92 km^{2})
  - Water: 0.027 sq mi (0.07 km^{2}) 0.08%
- Elevation: 1,644 ft (501 m)

Population (2020)
  - Total: 641 ▼
  - Density: 17.9/sq mi (6.90/km^{2})
- GNIS feature ID: 0838271

Stanton Township is one of fifteen townships in Fillmore County, Nebraska, United States. The population was 641 at the 2020 census.

A portion of the city of Geneva lies within the township.

== See also ==
- County government in Nebraska
