= Fort Lyon (Virginia) =

Historic fort in Virginia, USA

- Part of the Civil War defenses of Washington, D.C.
- Fairfax County, Virginia, USA
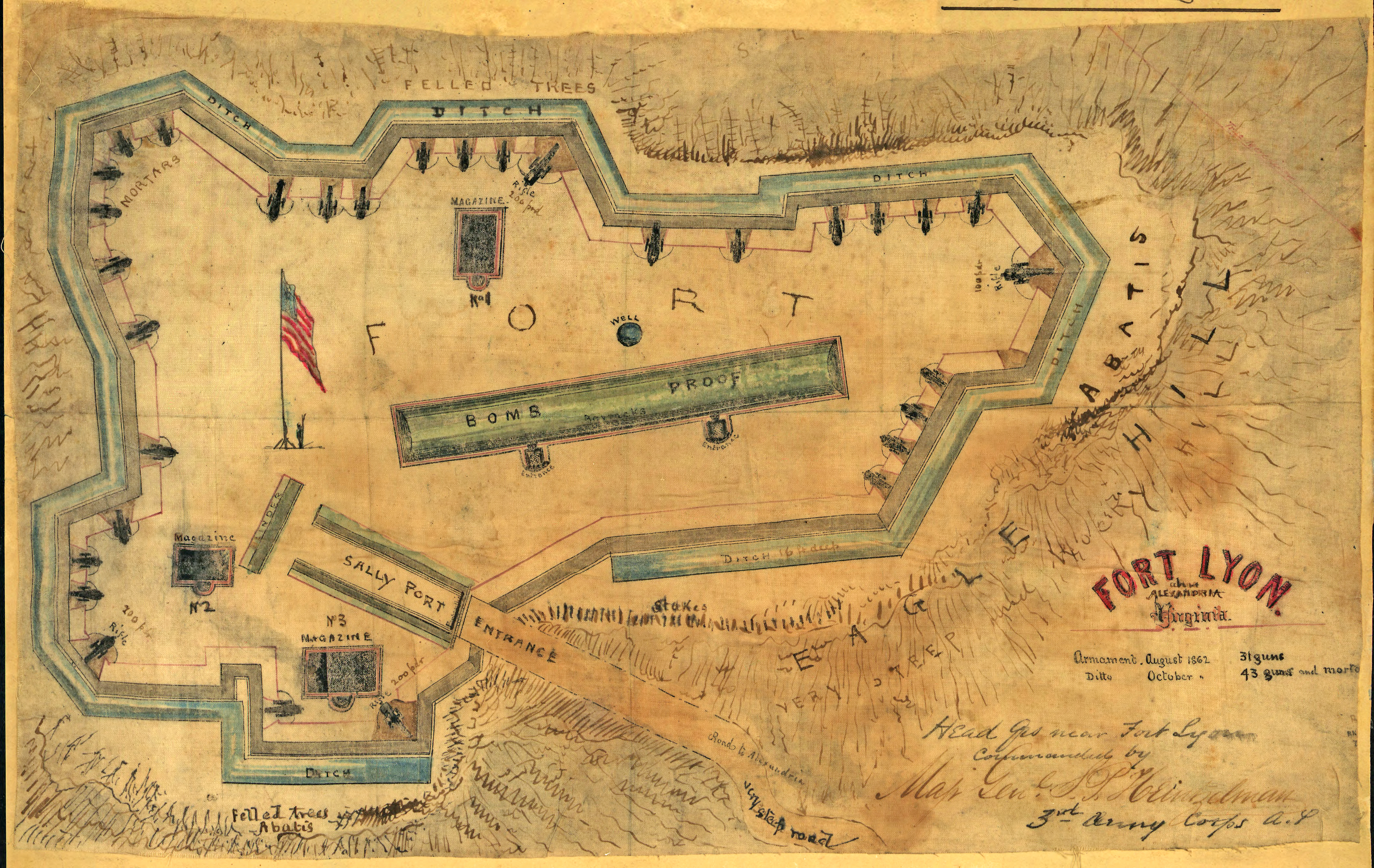
- A diagram of Fort Lyon, indicating cannon, magazine, and bombproof locations as well as the overall shape of the fort.

Site information
- Type: Earthwork fort
- Controlled by: Union Army
- Condition: Dismantled

Location
- Coordinates: 38°47′38″N 77°04′40″W

Site history
- Built: 1861
- Built by: U.S. Army Corps of Engineers
- In use: 1861–1865
- Materials: Earth, timber
- Demolished: 1865
- Battles/wars: American Civil War

Fort Lyon (usually Camp Lyon in Northern records) was a timber and earthwork fortification constructed south of Alexandria, Virginia, as part of the defenses of Washington, D.C. during the American Civil War. Built in the weeks following the Union defeat at Bull Run, Fort Lyon was situated on Ballenger's Hill south of Hunting Creek, and Cameron Run (which feeds into it), near Mount Eagle. From its position on one of the highest points south of Alexandria, the fort overlooked Telegraph Road, the Columbia Turnpike, the Orange and Alexandria Railroad, the Little River Turnpike, and the southern approaches to the city of Alexandria, the largest settlement in Union-occupied Northern Virginia.

The Huntington Station of the Washington Metro is located next to Fort Lyon's former hilltop site, which is commemorated by a historical marker at the north end of the station lot off North Kings Highway.

== Occupation of Arlington ==
Before the outbreak of the Civil War, Alexandria County (renamed Arlington County in 1920), the Virginia county closest to Washington, D.C., was a predominantly rural area. Originally part of the District of Columbia, the land now comprising the county was retroceded to Virginia in a July 9, 1846 act of Congress that took effect in 1847. Most of the county is hilly, and at the time, most of the county's population was concentrated in the city of Alexandria, at the far southeastern corner of the county. In 1861, the rest of the county largely consisted of scattered farms, the occasional house, fields for grazing livestock, and Arlington House, owned by Mary Custis, wife of Robert E. Lee.

Following the surrender of Fort Sumter in Charleston, South Carolina, on April 14, 1861, new American president Abraham Lincoln declared that "an insurrection existed," and called for 75,000 troops to be called up to quash the rebellion. The move sparked resentment in many other southern states, which promptly moved to convene discussions of secession. The Virginia State Convention passed "an ordinance of secession" and ordered a May 23 referendum to decide whether or not the state should secede from the Union. The U.S. Army responded by creating the Department of Washington, which united all Union troops in the District of Columbia and Maryland under one command.

Brigadier General Joseph K. Mansfield, commander of the Department of Washington, argued that Northern Virginia should be occupied as soon as possible in order to prevent the possibility of the Confederate Army mounting artillery on the hills of Arlington and shelling government buildings in Washington. He also urged the erection of fortifications on the Virginia side of the Potomac River to protect the southern termini of the Chain Bridge, Long Bridge, and Aqueduct Bridge. His superiors approved these recommendations, but decided to wait until after Virginia voted for or against secession.

On May 23, 1861, Virginia voted by a margin of 3 to 1 in favor of leaving the Union. That night, U.S. Army troops began crossing the bridges linking Washington, D.C. to Virginia. The march, which began at 10 p.m. on the night of the 23rd, was described in colorful terms by the New York Herald two days later:

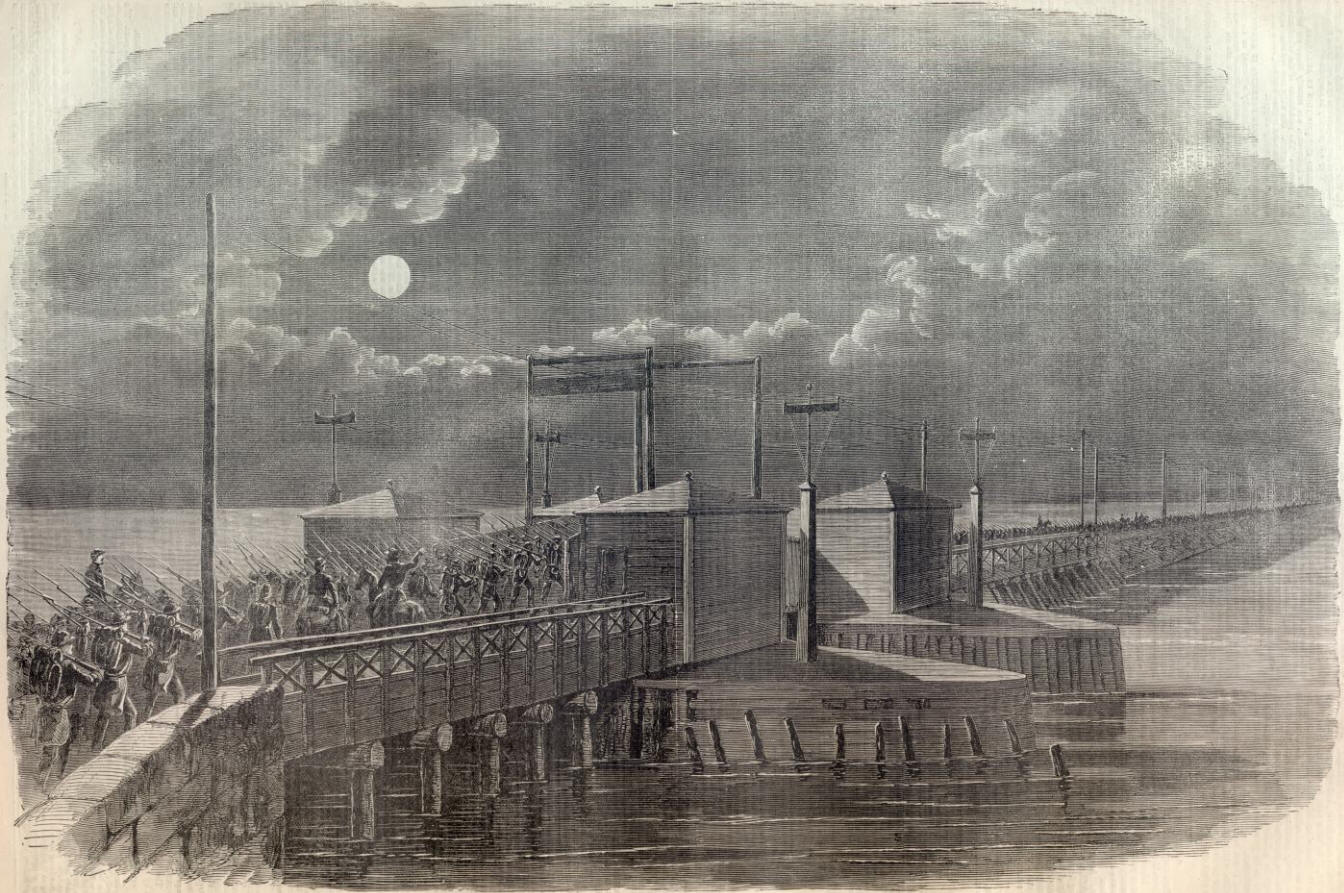
Union soldiers cross the Long Bridge during the occupation of northern Virginia following that state's secession from the Union

There can be no more complaints of inactivity of the government. The forward march movement into Virginia, indicated in my despatches last night, took place at the precise time this morning that I named, but in much more imposing and powerful numbers.

About ten o'clock last night four companies of picked men moved over the Long Bridge, as an advance guard. They were sent to reconnoitre, and if assailed were ordered to signal, when they would have been reinforced by a corps of regular infantry and a battery....

At twelve o'clock the infantry regiment, artillery and cavalry corps began to muster and assume marching order. As fast as the several regiments were ready they proceeded to the Long Bridge, those in Washington being directed to take that route.

The troops quartered at Georgetown, the Sixty-ninth, Fifth, Eighth and Twenty-eighth New York Regiments, proceeded across what is known as the Chain Bridge, above the mouth of the Potomac Aqueduct, under the command of General McDowell. They took possession of the heights in that direction.

The imposing scene was at the Long Bridge, where the main body of the troops crossed. Eight thousand infantry, two regular cavalry companies and two sections of Sherman's artillery battalion, consisting of two batteries, were in line this side of the Long Bridge at two o'clock.

The occupation of Northern Virginia was peaceful, with the sole exception of the town of Alexandria. There, as Colonel Elmer E. Ellsworth, commander of the New York Fire Zouaves (11th New York Volunteer Infantry Regiment), entered a local hotel to remove the Confederate flag flying above it, he was shot and killed by James Jackson, the proprietor. Ellsworth was one of the first men killed in the American Civil War. Throughout the remainder of the war, Alexandria would lean strongly towards the Confederate government, necessitating continued occupation by a Union garrison.

=== Battle of Bull Run ===
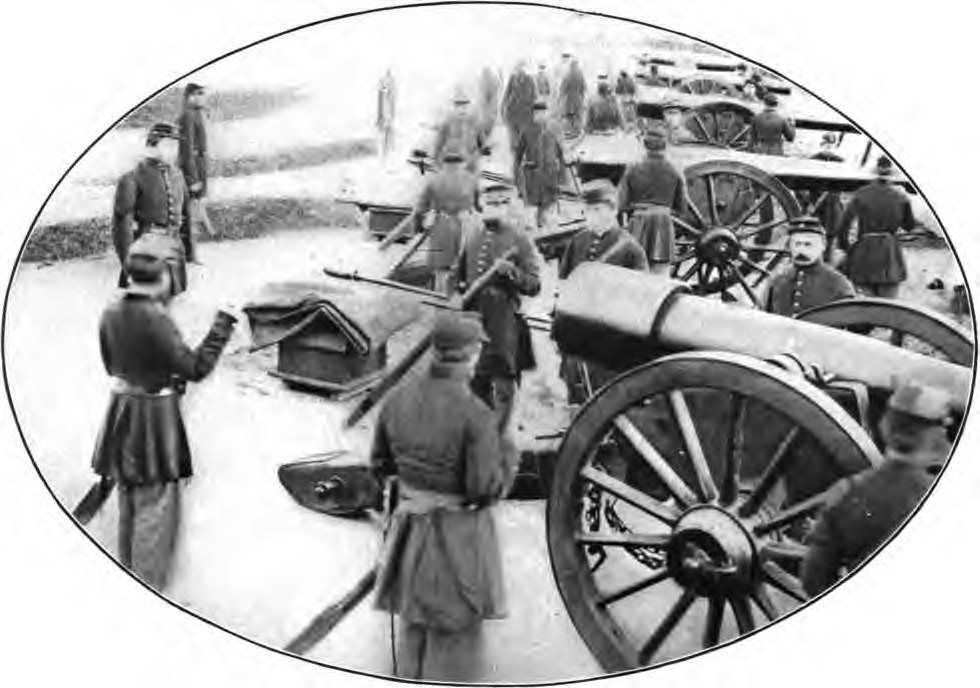
Gun Crews at Fort Lyon, Virginia

Over the seven weeks that followed the occupation of northern Virginia, forts were constructed along the banks of the Potomac River and at the approaches to each of the three major bridges (Chain Bridge, Long Bridge, and Aqueduct Bridge) connecting Virginia to Washington and Georgetown.

While the Potomac River forts were being built, planning and surveying was ordered for an enormous new ring of forts to protect the city. Unlike the fortifications under construction, the new forts would defend the city in all directions, not just the most direct route through Arlington. In mid-July, this work was interrupted by the First Battle of Bull Run. As the Army of Northeastern Virginia marched south to Manassas, the soldiers previously assigned to construction duties marched instead to battle. In the days that followed the Union defeat at Bull Run, panicked efforts were made to defend Washington from what was perceived as an imminent Confederate attack. The makeshift trenches and earthworks that resulted were largely confined to Arlington and the direct approaches to Washington.

On July 26, 1861, five days after the battle, Maj. Gen. George B. McClellan was named commander of the military district of Washington and the subsequently renamed Army of the Potomac. Upon arriving in Washington, McClellan was appalled by the condition of the city's defenses.

In no quarter were the dispositions for defense such as to offer a vigorous resistance to a respectable body of the enemy, either in the position and numbers of the troops or the number and character of the defensive works... not a single defensive work had been commenced on the Maryland side. There was nothing to prevent the enemy shelling the city from heights within easy range, which could be occupied by a hostile column almost without resistance.

To remedy the situation, one of McClellan's first orders upon taking command was to greatly expand the defenses of Washington. At all points of the compass, forts and entrenchments would be constructed in sufficient strength to defeat any attack. Alexandria, which contained the southern terminus of the Chesapeake and Ohio Canal and one of the largest ports in the Chesapeake Bay, was an object of "anxious study."

== Planning and construction ==
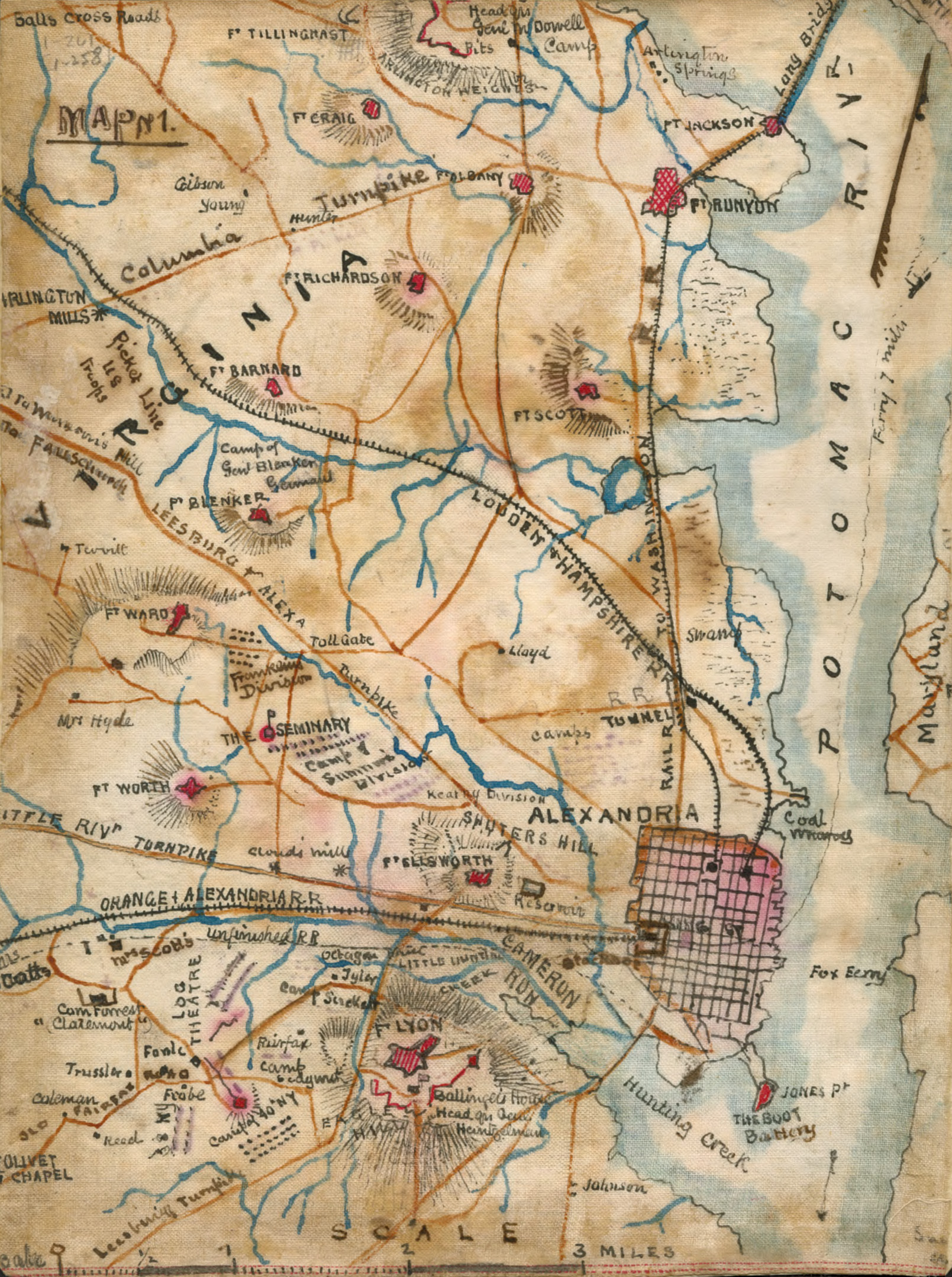
Map of Civil War forts near Alexandria, showing Fort Lyon (ca. September 1861)

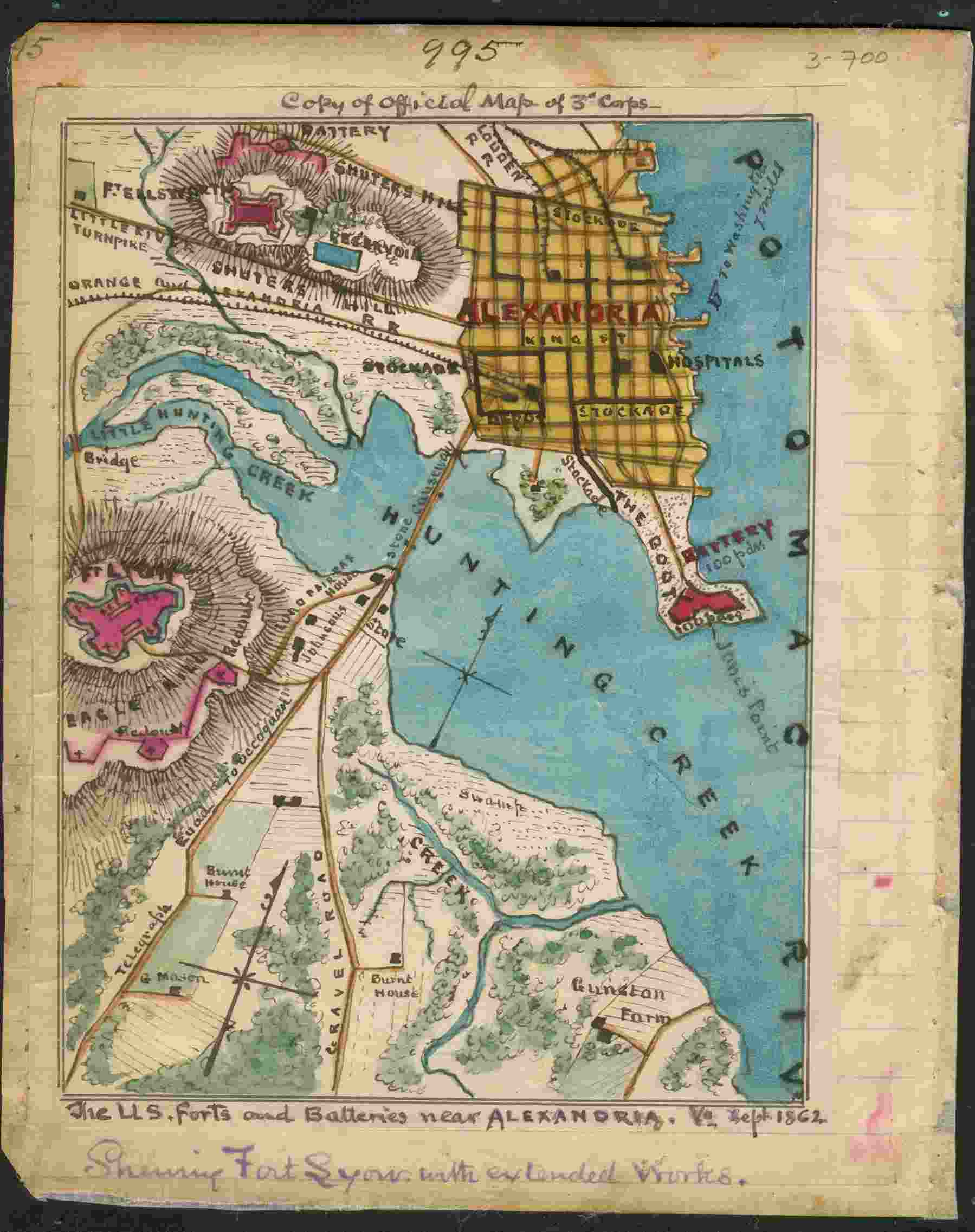
Fort Lyon, Virginia Map

Gen. Horatio Wright, who had overseen the construction of Fort Ellsworth, and Gen. John Newton, who was in charge of the forts south of Four Mile Run, supervised the construction and managed the flow of men and material.

It was laid out in September 1861 with a perimeter of 937 yards (857 m), covering nine acres (3.6 ha), and was surrounded by abatis, and rifle pits. The fort built by the 27th New York Volunteer Infantry Regiment. It had 31 guns, including four 200 pounders, (8-inch (203 mm) Parrott rifles), and 16 mortars. It was named for Brigadier General Nathaniel Lyon, who was killed at the Battle of Wilson's Creek, Missouri, August 10, 1861.

== Wartime use ==
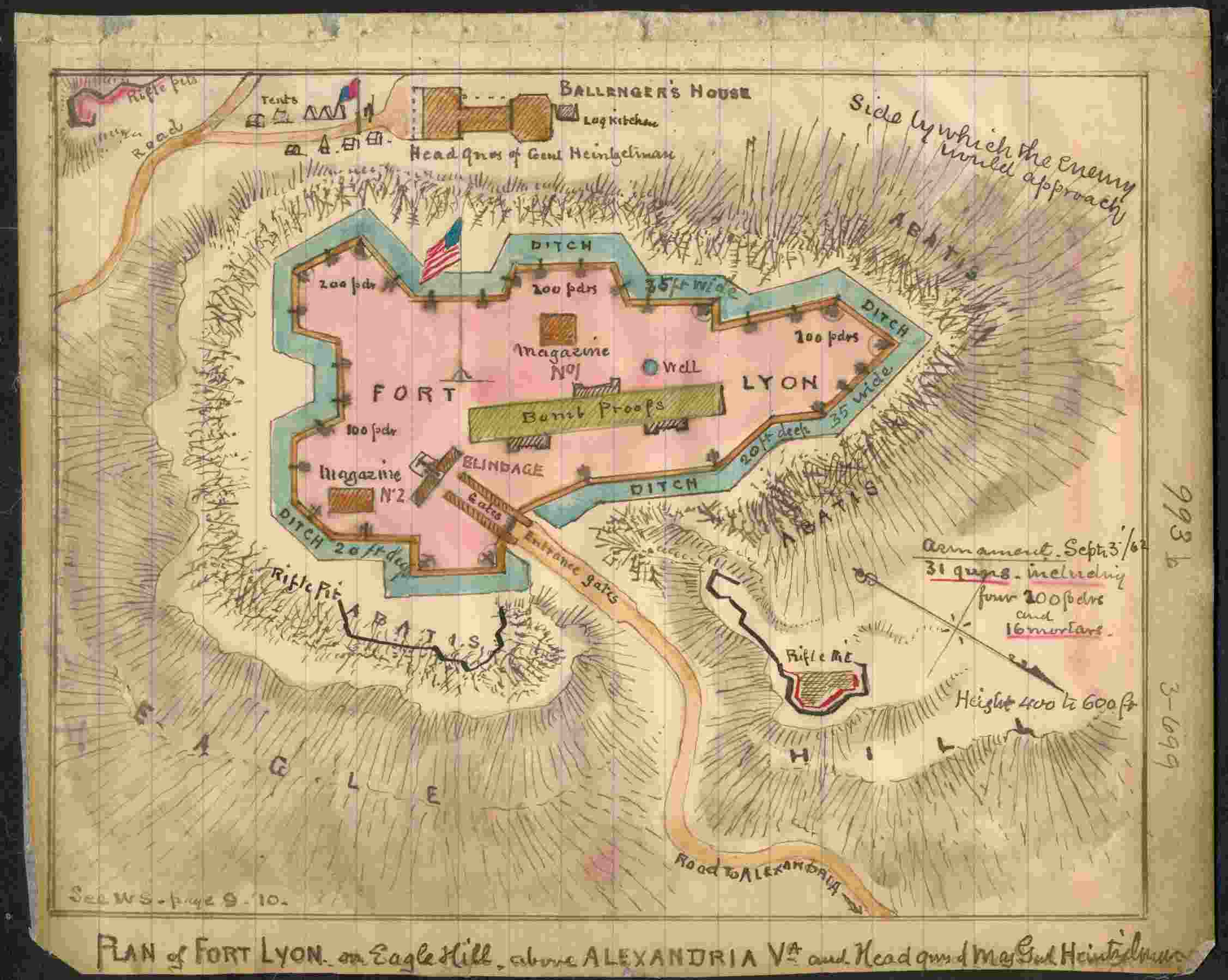
Fort Lyon Map

General Samuel P. Heintzelman was headquartered at Fort Lyon, southwest of Alexandria, when he was in charge of the defense of Washington from 27 October 1862 to 13 October 1863. Robert Knox Sneden served there on his staff, from January 12, 1862 to March 22, 1862, when they embarked for the Peninsula Campaign.

On June 9, 1863, Fort Lyon was rocked by an enormous black powder explosion that resulted in the deaths of 25 soldiers and the destruction of eight tons of powder and several thousand rounds of ammunition. The explosion was loud enough to be heard in nearby Alexandria, and one witness noted:

...about two o'clock today..we were startled by a most violent thundering explosion, followed by another, in quick succession, the earth shook and trembled... I was so frightened...a shell burst very near, for a little stream of blue smoke came in one door and passed out the other... I looked up at Fort Lyon, which at that moment went up with a tremendous shock...It...looked...like the pictures of Vesuvus [sic] during an eruption... Everything flew up from the center and seemed to stand still for a moment...then...pieces of steel, stones, and dirt, came rattling, and thundering down...

In the wake of the explosion, Fort Lyon, and Alexandria were visited by many military and civilian dignitaries, including Secretary of War Edwin Stanton and President Abraham Lincoln.

The garrison was originally the 16th New York Volunteer Infantry Regiment, 26th New York Volunteer Infantry Regiment, 27th New York Volunteer Infantry Regiment, 107th New York Volunteer Infantry, 142nd Ohio Infantry, 15th New York Heavy Artillery Regiment. In October 1864, Company's G, H, K, and M, 1st Wisconsin Heavy Artillery Regiment were assigned to the Fort. They were mustered out on June 26, 1865.

== Post-war ==
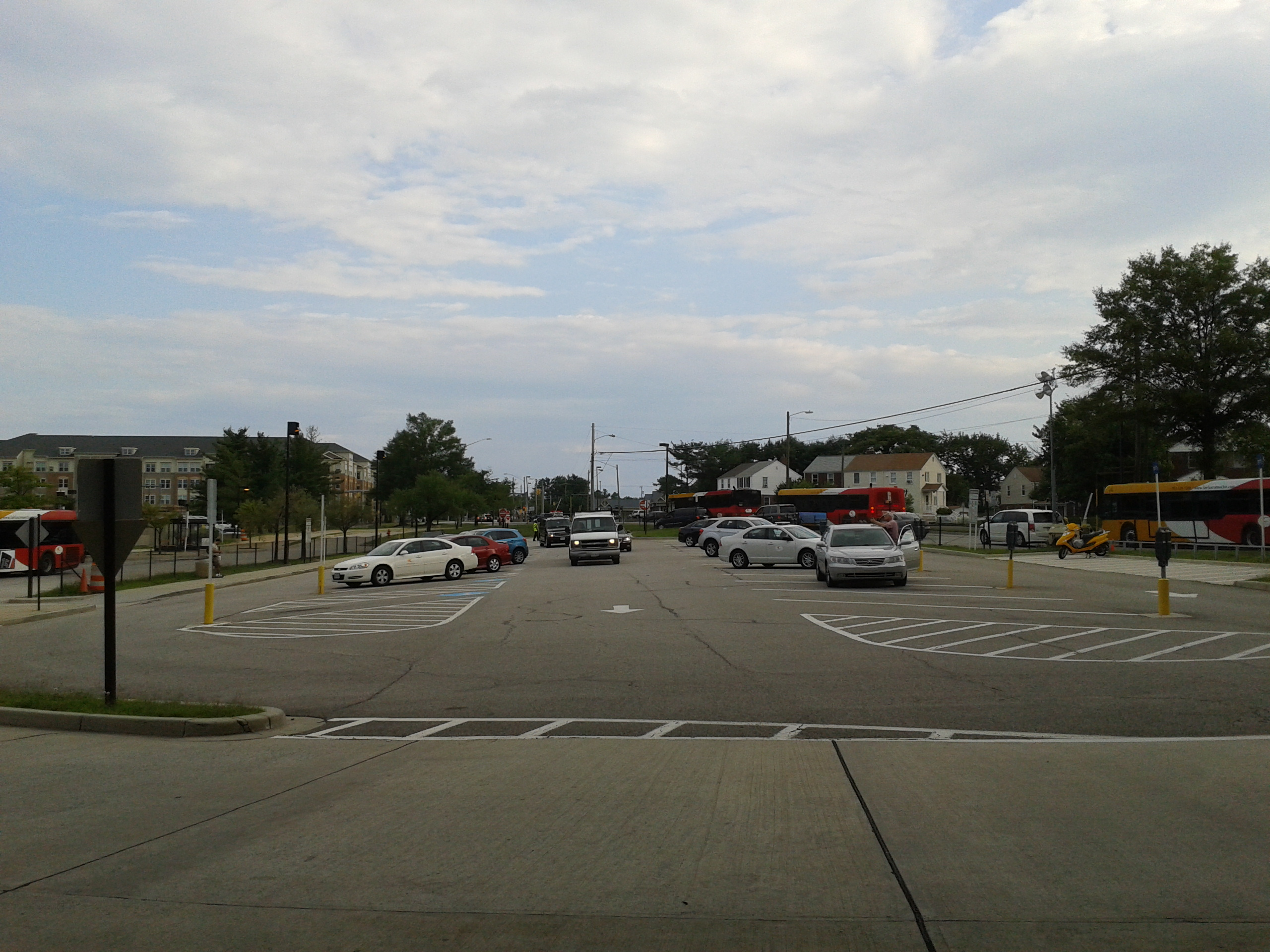
The site of Fort Lyon as it appeared in 2014.

Nothing remains of the fort today; only a historical marker, located at the north end of the North Kings Highway parking area of the Huntington Metro station and erected in 1998 by the Virginia Department of Historic Resources, marks its former location.

There is also a historical marker at the south end of Mount Eagle Park describing the earthen works erected by the Union Army. Though much of it has been eroded, a small path still exists where you can walk back to where the earthen works are.
