= Rock Creek Park (disambiguation) =

Rock Creek Park is a park in Washington, DC. It may also refer to:

- Rock Creek Park, Colorado, an unincorporated community and census-designated place
- Rock Creek Park Golf Course, Washington, DC
- "Rock Creek Park", a track from the album City Life by The Blackbyrds

== See also ==
- Rock Creek State Park, Iowa
