= Little Forest (disambiguation) =

Little Forest is a Japanese manga series.

Little Forest may also refer to:

== Entertainment ==
- Little Forest (film), is a 2018 South Korean drama film
- Little Forest (TV series), is a 2019 South Korean TV series

== Animal ==
- Little forest bat, is a species of vesper bat

== Places ==
- Little Forest Hills, Dallas, is a neighborhood in east Dallas, Texas (USA)
- Little Forest Park, an undeveloped park located in the Washington, D.C. (USA)
- Little Forest, New South Wales, a rural suburb in Australia
- Pichilemu, a city in Chile
