= Military Road (Washington, D.C.) =

Major west-east road in Washington, D.C.

- Length: 2.97 mi (4.78 km)
- Location: Washington, D.C.
- West end: Western Avenue
- East end: Missouri Avenue

Military Road is a major east–west collector road and limited-access road in the northwestern quadrant of Washington, D.C., United States.

== History ==
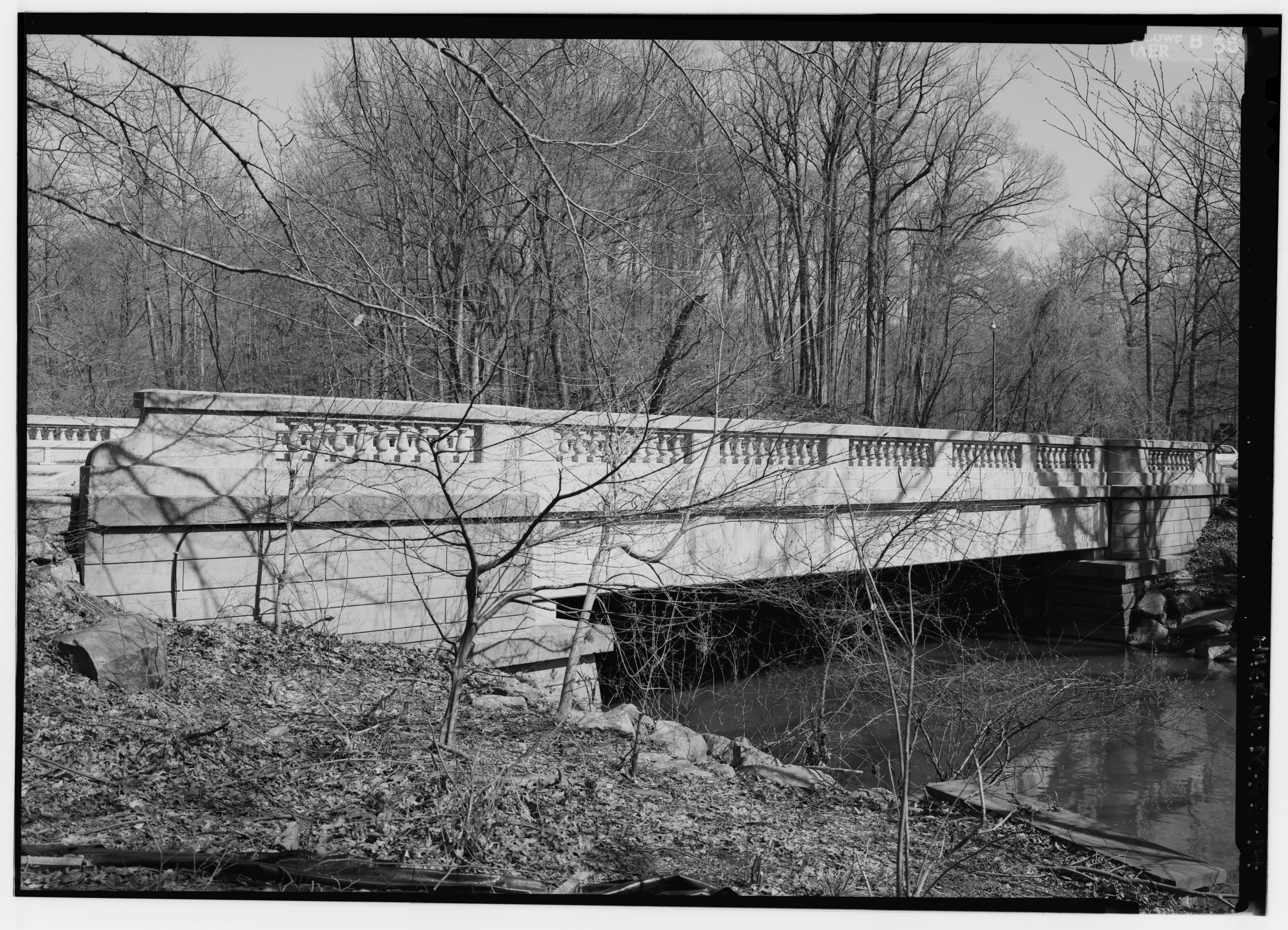
Old Military Road Bridge (Joyce Road Bridge)

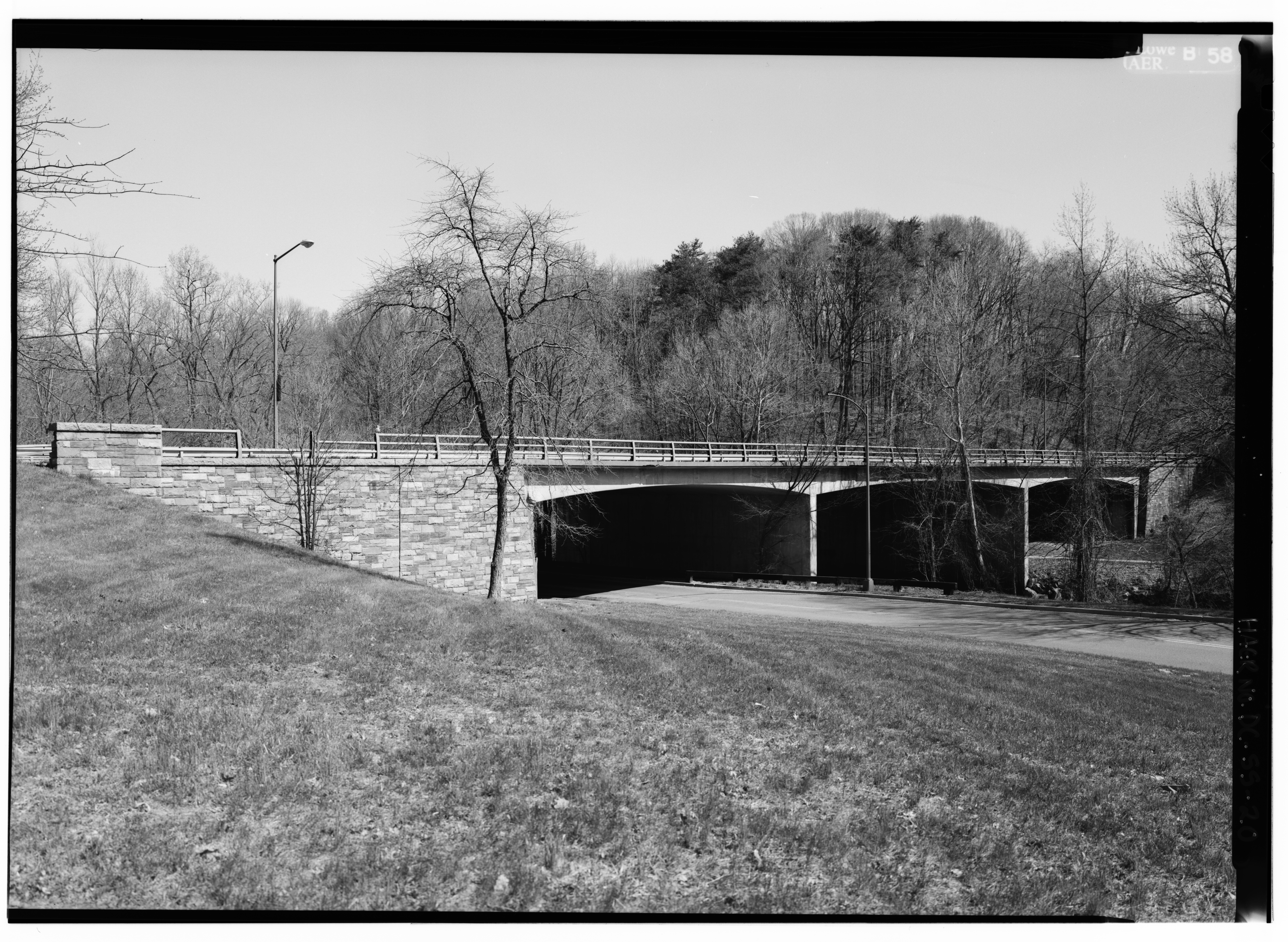
New Military Road Bridge

Military Road was constructed by the Union Army during the American Civil War, intended to serve as a route connecting military forts in Northwest D.C. It also served as a second crossing over Rock Creek, with a bridge (now Joyce Road Bridge) constructed in 1929, as a bypass of the Milkhouse Road ford that initially served as the only crossing in the area. Around 1960, a four-lane limited-access parkway bypass with a new bridge crossing Rock Creek was built, realigning Military Road from the original two-lane road across the creek.

== Route ==
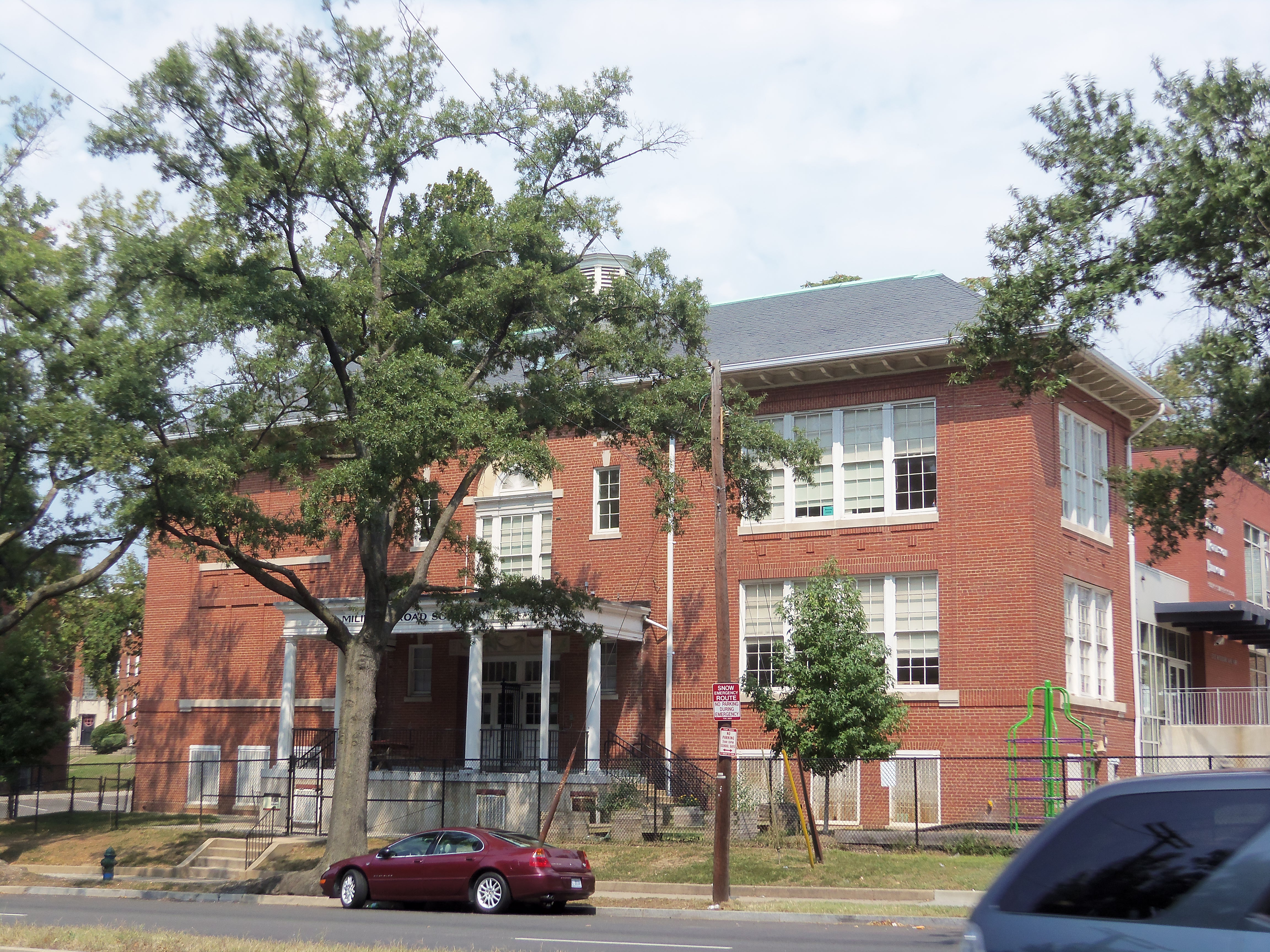
Military Road School

Military Road begins at the Maryland border in Friendship Heights as a two-lane collector road and heads east through the neighborhood of Chevy Chase where it intersects Connecticut Avenue halfway through the neighborhood. Once crossing Nebraska Avenue, Military Road widens to four lanes. Eventually, the road curves northeast, passes St. John's College High School, and crosses Oregon Avenue then becomes a 35 mph (56 km/h) limited-access road through Rock Creek Park. Through the park, Military Road has a partial trumpet interchange with Joyce Road, crosses the creek, then forms a parclo interchange with 16th Street NW. At the eastern end of the parkway portion, Military Road intersects with 14th Street NW and becomes a general arterial road, and shortly becomes Missouri Avenue, near the Military Road School, which continues east towards U.S. Route 29.

== Major intersections ==
| Location | mi | km | Destinations | Notes |
|---|---|---|---|---|
| Washington | 0.00 | 0.00 | Western Avenue at Maryland border | Western terminus of Military Road |
| Washington | 0.27 | 0.43 | 41st Street NW; Reno Road | |
| Washington | 0.44 | 0.71 | 39th Street NW | |
| Washington | 0.64 | 1.03 | Connecticut Avenue | |
| Washington | 0.87 | 1.40 | Nevada Avenue | |
| Washington | 1.03 | 1.66 | Nebraska Avenue | |
| Washington | 1.15 | 1.85 | 32nd Street NW | |
| Washington | 1.24 | 2.00 | 31st Street NW | |
| Washington | 1.37 | 2.20 | 30th Street NW | |
| Washington | 1.56 | 2.51 | 27th Street NW | |
| Washington | 1.76 | 2.83 | Oregon Avenue; Glover Road | Access to St. John's College High School; Access to Rock Creek Park |
| Washington | 2.19– 2.26 | 3.52– 3.64 | Joyce Road; Ross Drive | Trumpet interchange; eastbound entrance located at 16th Street interchange Access to Rock Creek Park Golf Course |
| Washington | 2.28– 2.34 | 3.67– 3.77 | Bridge over Rock Creek and Beach Drive | |
| Washington | 2.56– 2.58 | 4.12– 4.15 | Bridge over Joyce Road | |
| Washington | 2.58– 2.86 | 4.15– 4.60 | 16th Street NW; Joyce Road (eastbound entrance); Missouri Avenue | Parclo interchange |
| Washington | 2.89 | 4.65 | 14th Street NW | |
| Washington | 2.97 | 4.78 | Missouri Avenue | Eastern terminus of Military Road; continuation east beyond terminus as Missouri Avenue; Access to Military Road School |
1.000 mi = 1.609 km; 1.000 km = 0.621 mi
