= Battery Cameron =

Historic fort in Washington, DC

- Part of Civil War defenses of Washington, D.C.
- District of Columbia; Near Georgetown (Washington, D.C.) in United States

Site information
- Controlled by: Union Army

Battery Cameron was a Union Army defensive site during the Civil War. Battery Cameron was one in a chain of fortifications in the Civil War Defenses of Washington, D.C., also known as the "Fort Circle". The battery was located atop a hill on Foxhall Road at what is now the intersection of Foxhall and Whitehaven Parkway, NW. The battery included two 100-pound Parrott rifles, placed in such a way as to sweep Aqueduct Bridge, and Virginia beyond.

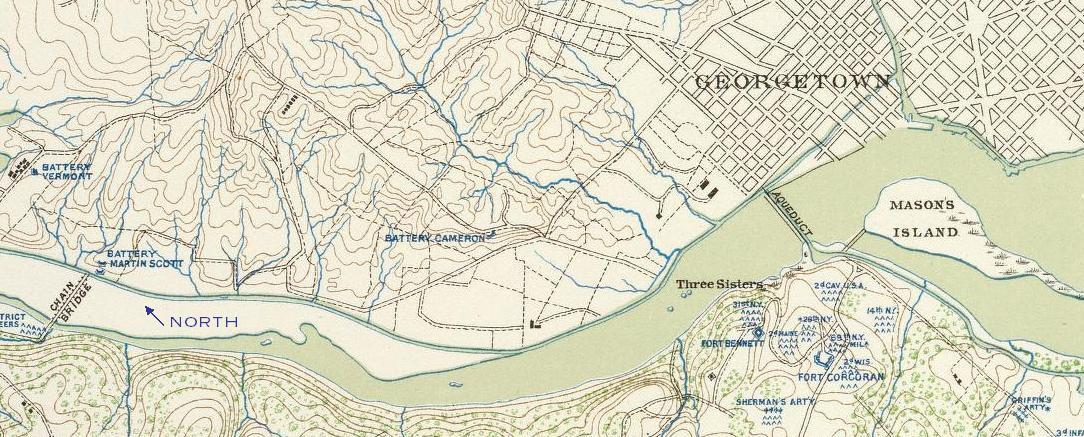
Battery Cameron in the Civil War Defenses of Washington, 1861. Note the absence of Battery Kemble to the north.

The site on which Battery Cameron was located is now a reservoir. The property is administered by the Army Corps of Engineers. Its neighbors are the German Embassy (to the south), and George Washington University's Mount Vernon Campus (to the north).

== First High Service Reservoir ==
Underneath Battery Cameron is a facility administered by the DC Water and Sewer Authority (WASA) called the "First High Service Reservoir". For many residents in the area, this is the first place that potable water is pumped after it has been treated at the Dalecarlia Water Treatment Plant. The First High Service Reservoir was built in 1924, and has a capacity of 14.5 million US gallons (55,000 m^{3}).

== International espionage ==
Robert Hanssen, the former FBI agent who spied for Soviet and Russian intelligence agencies until 2001, used the utility pole on the corner of Foxhall and Whitehaven, just outside the fence of the reservoir (formerly known as Battery Cameron) as a signal site.
