= Peirce Mill =

- U.S. National Register of Historic Places
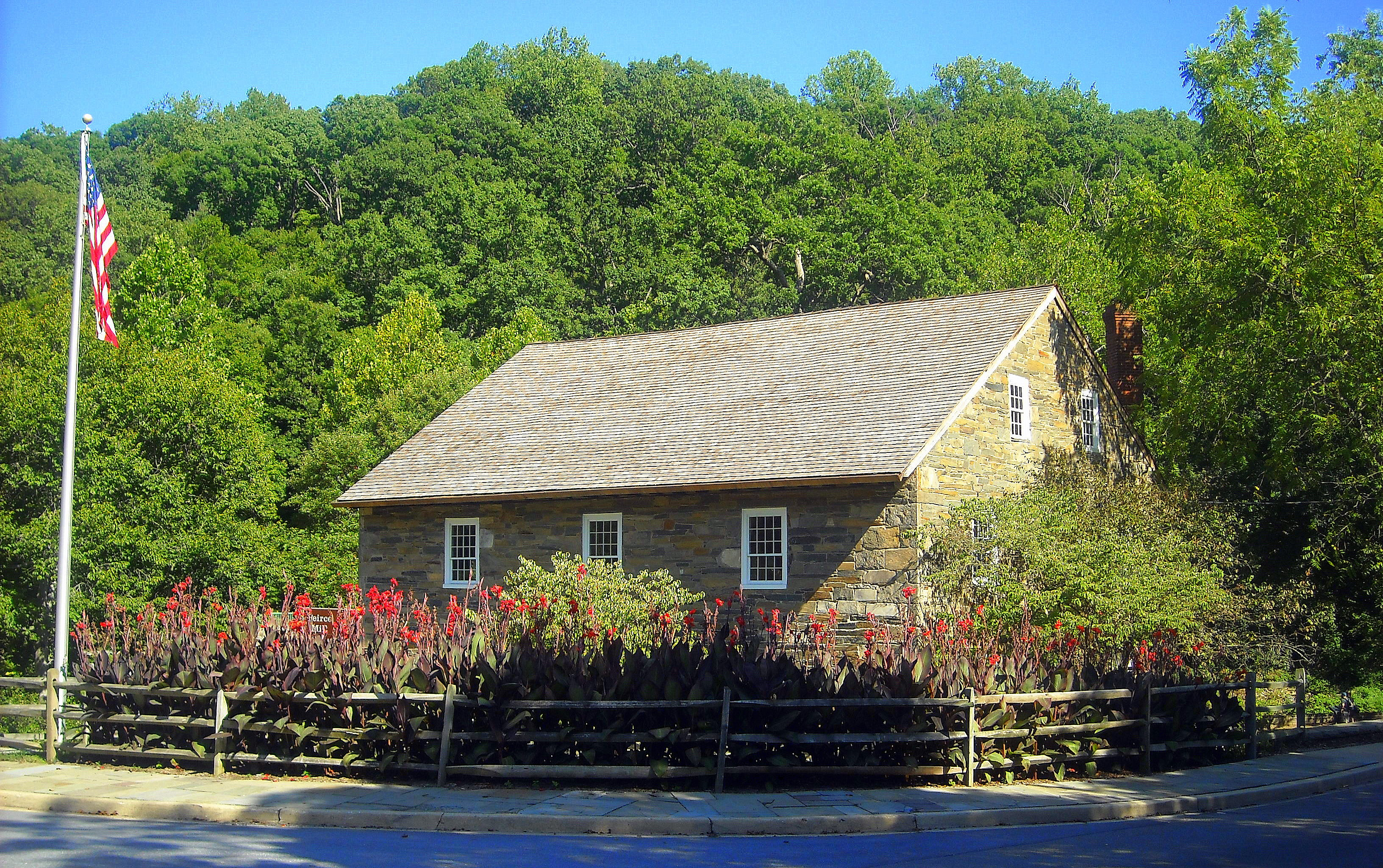
- Peirce Mill in 2008

- Location within District of Columbia
- Location: Tilden Street and Beach Drive, N.W., Washington, District of Columbia, United States
- Coordinates: 38°56′24″N 77°3′8″W
- Built: 1820
- NRHP reference No.: 69000014
- Added to NRHP: March 24, 1969

The Peirce Mill is a historic mill building located in Rock Creek Park, at Tilden Street and Beach Drive, Northwest, Washington, D.C., United States.

== History ==
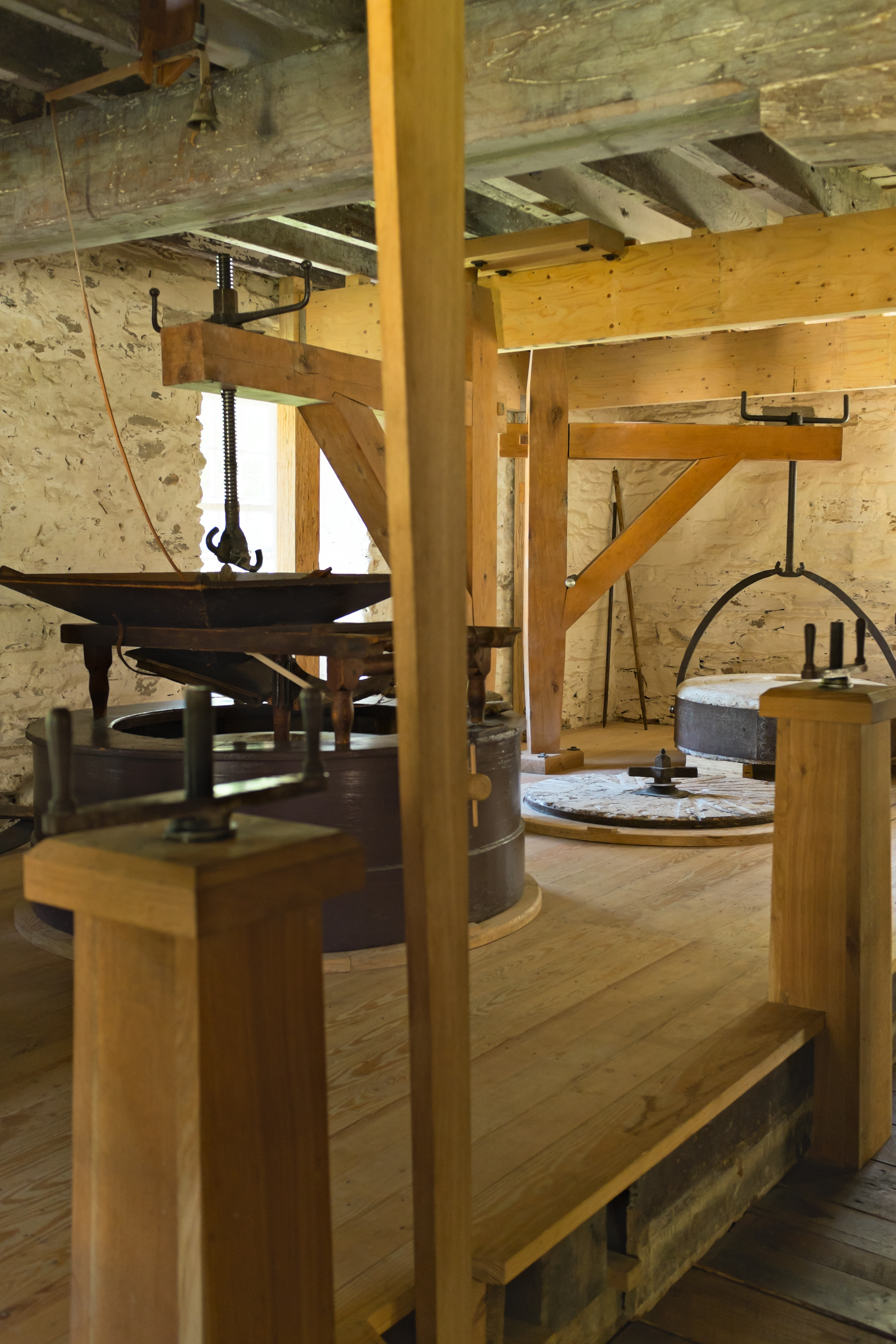
Millstones inside the mill

Issac Peirce, a millwright, built the mill either in 1820 or 1829. Peirce rebuilt this mill according to Oliver Evans's ideas for milling, with much of the automated machinery on the upper floors. During the 1860s, as many as 12 wagonloads of wheat arrived for grinding. It was possible to grind 70 bushels per day per set of millstones. The last commercial load was ground in 1897, when the main shaft broke while Alcibiades P. White was grinding a load of rye. The building served as a public teahouse until the 1930s.

The United States Government bought the mill as part of Rock Creek Park in 1892. Peirce Mill was restored as a Public Works Administration project, completed in March 1936, at a cost of $26,614. Operation began on October 27, 1936, under the supervision of miller Robert A. Little. The mill was used from December 1, 1936 until 1958 to provide flour for government cafeterias, whereupon because of lack of trained millwrights and lack of water in the millrace, it was used only as a historical site.

The mill was shut down in April, 1993. In 1997, a restoration effort was begun by the Friends of Peirce Mill (FOPM). The mill was restored with the support of the American Recovery and Reinvestment Act (ARRA). The mill officially reopened in October, 2011. The NPS typically runs mill operation demonstrations on the 2nd and 4th Saturday of each month, April through October.

Historic Peirce Mill in Rock Creek Park, Washington DC USA.

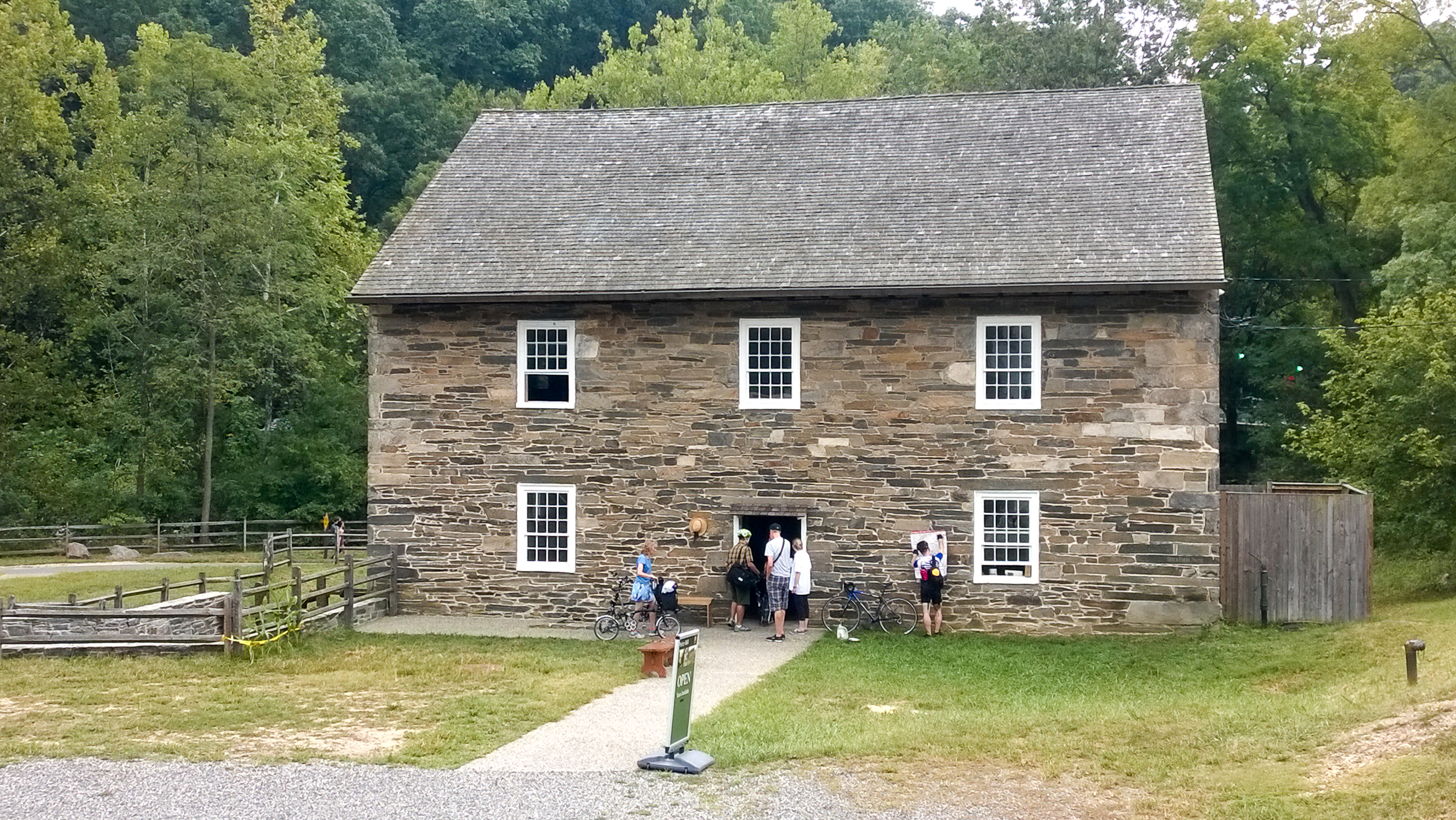
Peirce Mill front exterior.

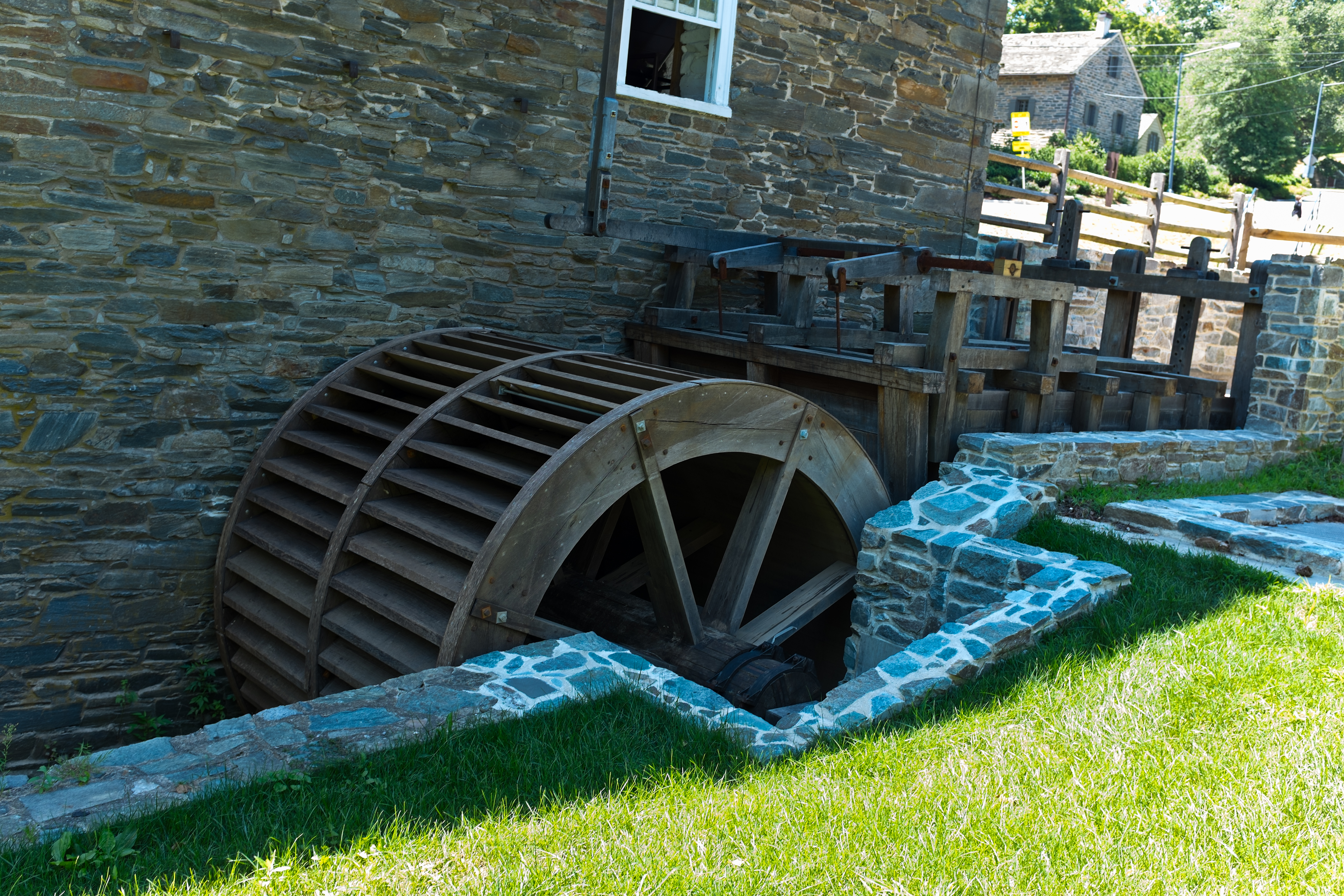
The breast-shot wheel

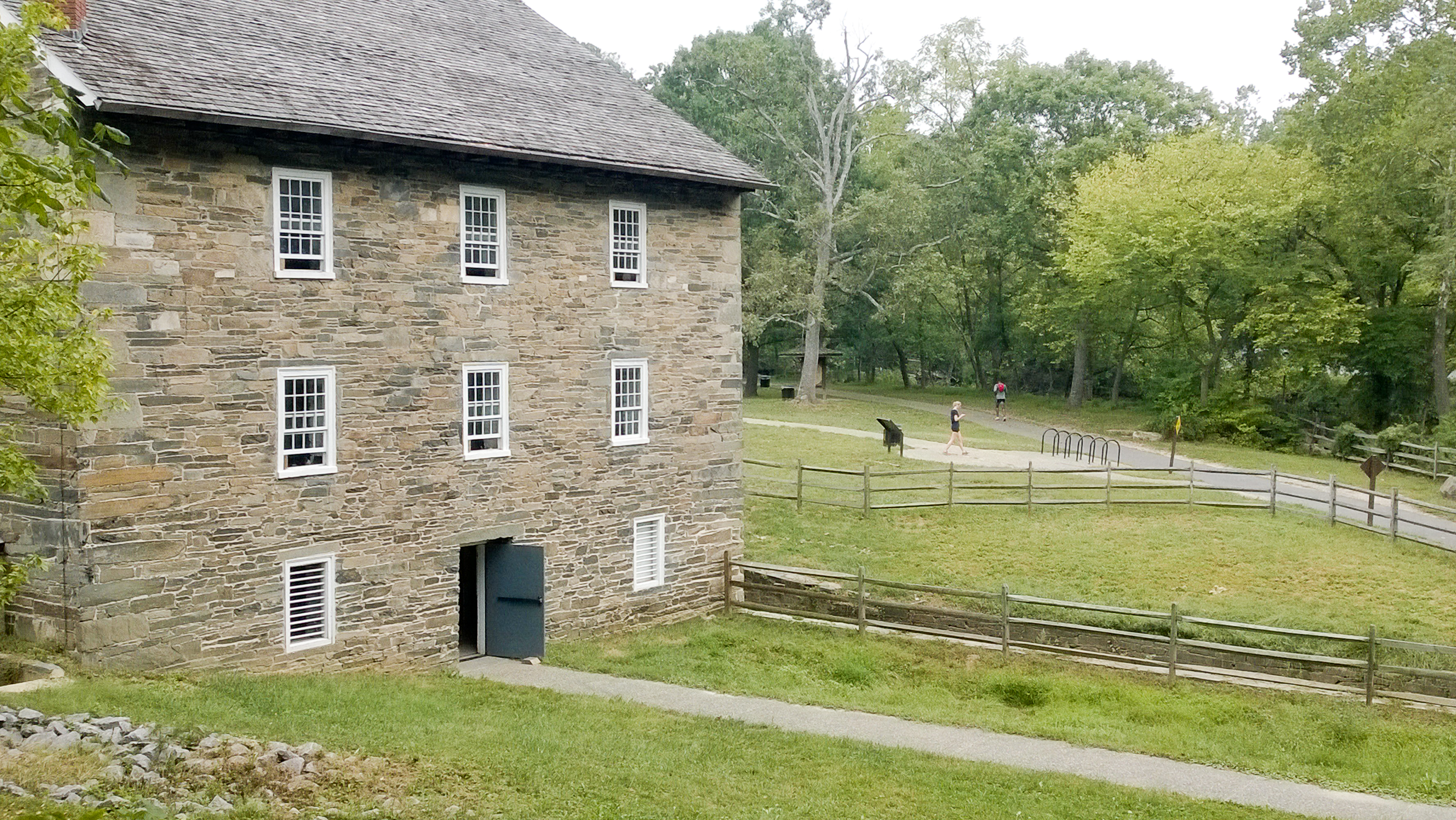
Peirce Mill back exterior.

== Facts ==
The mill has three pairs of millstones. The millstones are 4 1/2 feet across and weigh about 2,400 lbs, and rotate at about 125 rpm. About 60% of the power is used to turn the millstones, the rest for the remaining machinery. The Peirce family themselves were not millers and did not operate the mill, but instead had other millers do so.

== Pierce Mill vs. Peirce Mill ==
There was a "Pierce" (note spelling) mill on the Potomac River, not to be confused with Peirce mill. The other mill (Pierce Mill) is listed in the NPS records and was near Fletcher's Boathouse.

== See also ==
- Rock Creek Park
