= Battery Kemble Park =

Park in Washington, D.C., U.S.

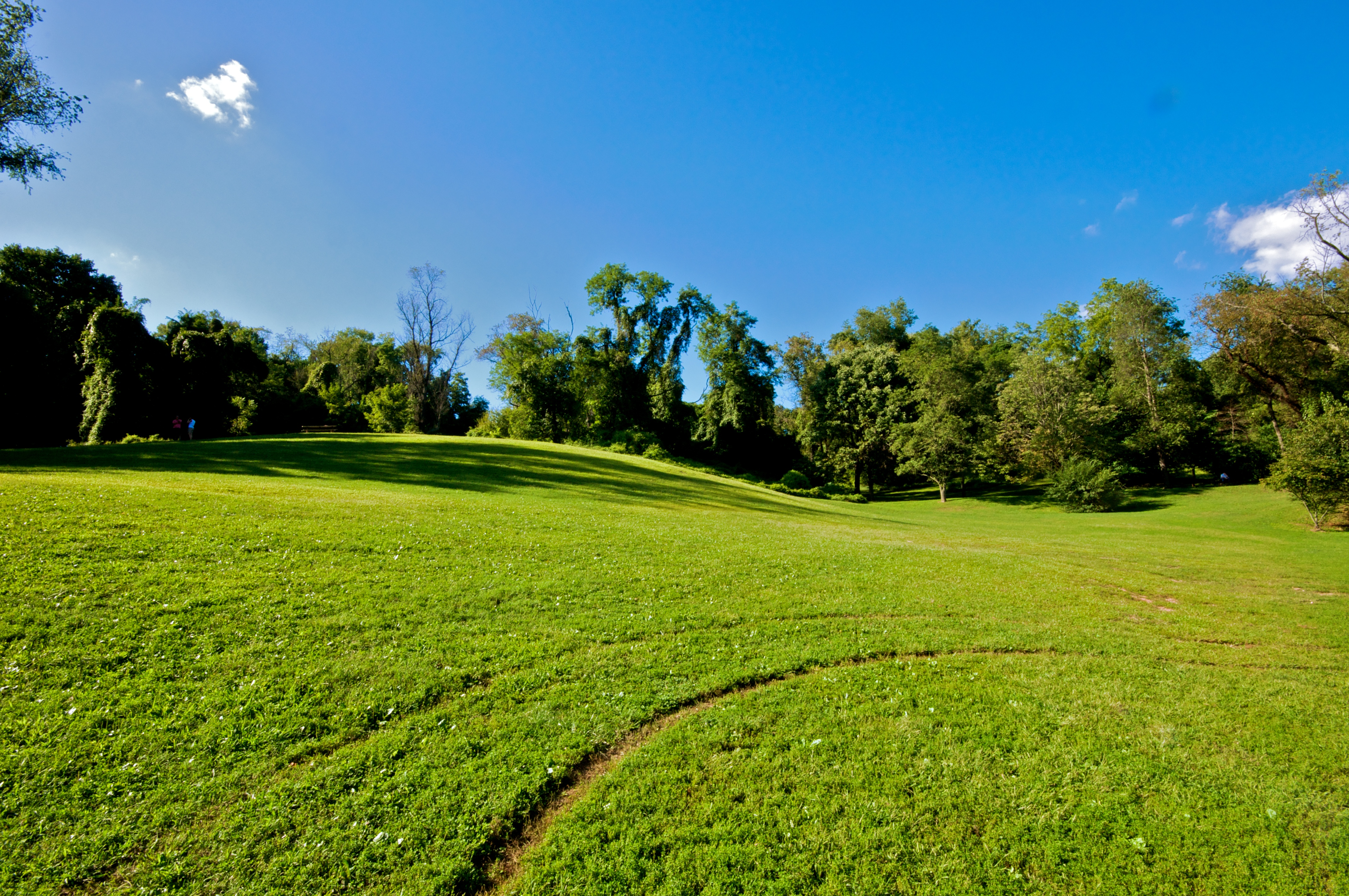
- Battery Kemble Park, September 2009

- Location within District of Columbia
- Interactive map of Battery Kemble Park
- Location: Washington, D.C.
- Coordinates: 38°55′49″N 77°05′39″W
- Website: www.nps.gov/places/battery-kemble.htm

Battery Kemble Park is a park in Northwest Washington D.C., administered by the National Park Service.

Battery Kemble was a Union Army defensive site during the Civil War. The battery was located on Ridge Road (now Nebraska Avenue, NW), and included two 100-pound Parrott rifles, placed in such a way as to sweep Chain Bridge, Aqueduct Bridge, and Virginia beyond. Today, the parapet and gun positions are fairly well preserved and remain visible. The park is located south of Nebraska Avenue along Maddox Branch. Battery Kemble Park is bounded by Chain Bridge Road (to the west), MacArthur Boulevard (to the south), 49th Street (to the east), and Nebraska Avenue, NW (north). It is considered part of the Palisades neighborhood. The park is popular for running, sledding, and nature walks.

== Civil War defenses of Washington, or 'Fort Circle' ==
Battery Kemble was completed during the Autumn of 1861, as part of the Civil War Defenses of Washington, also known as the Fort Circle. It was named after Gouverneur Kemble of Cold Spring, New York, former superintendent of West Point Foundry, where most of the heavy Army and Navy guns were made during the Civil War. Battery Kemble is on the high point of land, 387 feet (118 m) above mean low level of the Potomac River, where its guns could protect both Chain Bridge and Aqueduct Bridge. The artillery had "an extreme range of 3 miles, while it is under the direct fire, to a distance of at least 1,000 yards of the works." The earthwork remains of the battery are distinct and well preserved.

Battery Kemble was one in a chain of fortifications directly protecting the DC side of Chain Bridge. Other nearby fortifications included Battery Cameron (two 100-pounder Parrott rifles), Battery Parrott (two 100-pounder Parrott rifles), Battery Martin Scott (one 8-inch Seacoast howitzer, two 32-pounder cannon; later changed to two 6-pounder cannon and two 12-pounder howitzers), and Battery Vermont (three 32-pounder seacoast cannon). Battery Kemble was built to provide support to Fort Stevens and Fort Slocum and to guard northern approaches to the city.

Wartime garrisons were manned by the 2nd U.S. Artillery, 9th New York Heavy Artillery, and Company A, 1st New Hampshire Heavy Artillery.

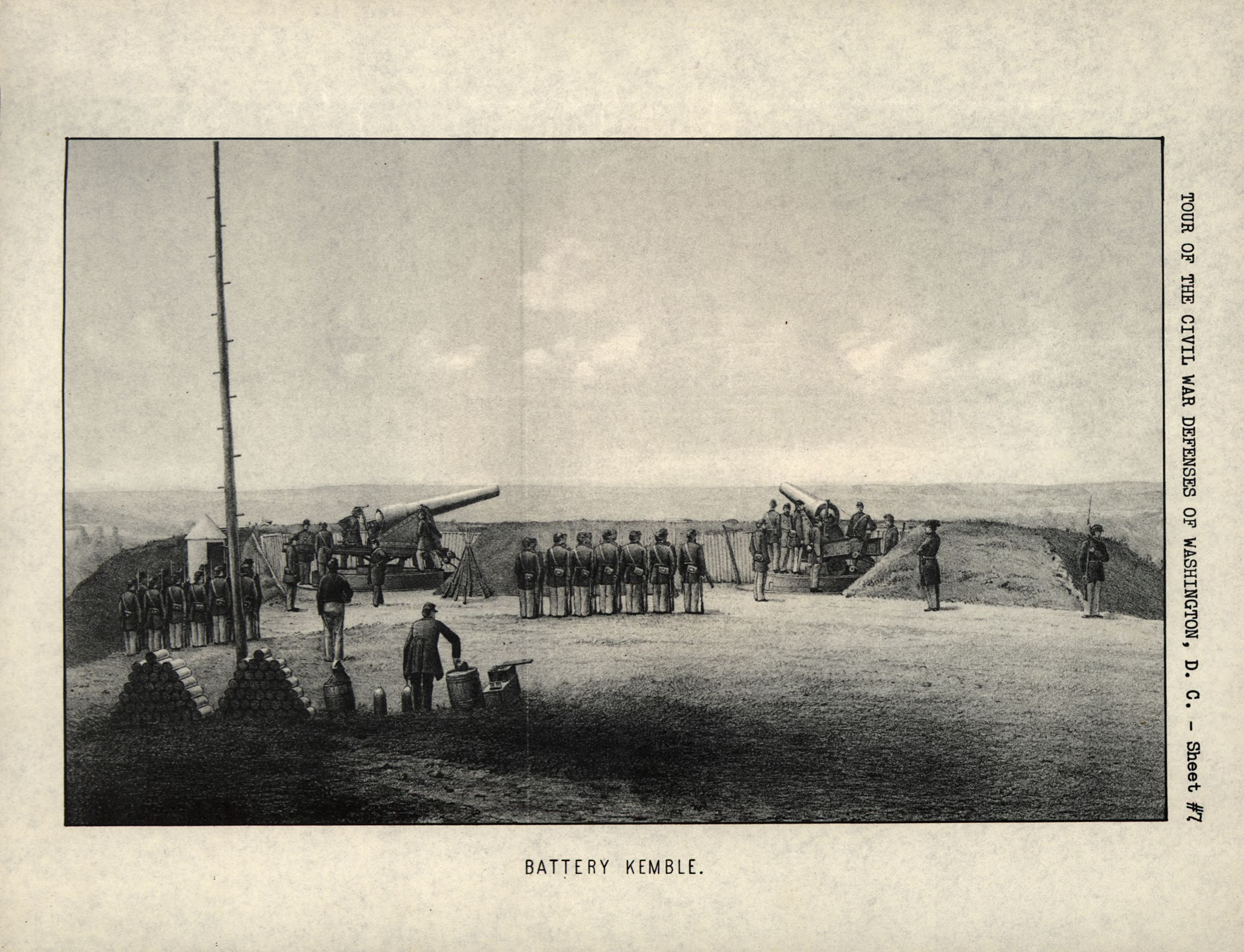
Battery Kemble in 1861

In 1861, an Army report described the initial conditions there:

Battery Kemble, Capt. F. E. Shaw commanding. – Garrison, one company First Maine Heavy Artillery – 3 officers, 1 ordnance - sergeant, 54 men. Armament, two 100-pounder Parrotts. Magazines, one; dry and in good order. Ammunition, full supply and serviceable. Implements, complete and serviceable. Drill in artillery, fair. Drill in infantry, fair. Garrison is sufficient.

— "General Reports About The Defenses", Office Chief Engineer Army of Potomac, Washington, D.C., December 10, 1861.

The soldiers' quarters at Battery Kemble (and Battery Cameron) remained unfinished, and in need of materials for completion, as late as 1864. Contemporaneous accounts by Augusta Weaver, "a woman of means" living nearby, describe how soldiers stationed at Battery Kemble pillaged neighboring residents' pantries, her own included. The property on which Battery Kemble was constructed was relinquished to the U.S. government by William A.T. Maddox, a career U.S. Marine Corps officer.

The land for Battery Kemble Park was reacquired by the federal government sometime between 1916 and 1923, a period of time during which much of the land for the D.C.-area Fort Parks was acquired. The National Capital Parks and Planning Commission acquired approximately 2.8 acres (11,000 m^{2}) for the "Fort Kemble" Park. However, it was almost fifteen years before the government corrected the name to "Battery Kemble."

== Fort Parks and Fort Drive ==
Battery Kemble had a prominent place in 50s-60s-era plans for Fort Drive, a plan originally conceived in the first decades of the twentieth century to connect D.C.'s Civil war defenses with a ring-shaped parkway ("not just widened streets"). The National Park Service and the District of Columbia signed a memorandum of agreement, on October 24, 1944, for the development of two Fort Drive sections, the first of which was from MacArthur Boulevard to Nebraska Avenue. National Park Service Associate Director A.E. Demaray informed the Secretary of the Interior that 98 percent of the Fort Drive right-of-way had been acquired and that its construction "is believed to be of first importance."

On October 1, 1964, the National Capital Planning Commission staff and other professionals took a bus tour to help decide whether it should "be developed as a park-like road, can it lend itself to be an intermediate loop, or should the forts remain isolated for just recreational use?" By May 1965, the local newspapers extolled a new proposal by Fred Tuemmler as a substitute for the Fort Drive. Tuemmler, whom the National Capital Planning Commission hired to re-evaluate Fort Drive, suggested the right-of-way land should "be reconstituted as a recreational facility" and, to emphasize that park recreation concept, rename it "Fort Park System." It would be "a place to get away from cars." Further, he saw it as a 30-mile (48 km) "ring of recreation and green space" around the city, running from Fort Greble Park to Battery Kemble Park, with hiking and bicycle paths.

== Administration ==
Battery Kemble's current superintendent is Cindy Cox, who succeeded Adrienne Coleman as Superintendent of Rock Creek Park, as of January 1, 2010.

It is policed by the United States Park Police (District 3), Metropolitan Police Department (2nd District), and occasionally U.S. Secret Service.

Former Superintendents include Joseph Brown (5/24/1965 - 5/6/1967), J. A. Martinek (5/7/1967 - 5/29/1971), and Joseph Antosca (9/5/1971 - 4/27/1972).

== Art and music ==
The earthworks slope at Battery Kemble was depicted in a 1989 landscape painting by David Holt entitled, Hillside in Battery Kemball [sic] Park, Washington, D.C. In 1991, Gunnar Plake created Battery Kemble, a C-type photographic print on aluminum. A view looking southwest, across the driveway, and towards a grove of bamboo, inspired the 2006 Carlton Fletcher painting Battery Kemble (676). Howard Carr, a painter who lives nearby, cites Battery Kemball as the inspiration for most of his works.

== Natural environment and geology ==
The park has abundant pine trees, and is home to many species of birds. There is also a dense grove of bamboo. Maddox Branch, a tributary of the Potomac River, flows through the park. The park is home to a chestnut oak, that is rated as the largest known tree of its species in the United States.
