= Bryce Park =

Park in Washington, D.C., U.S.

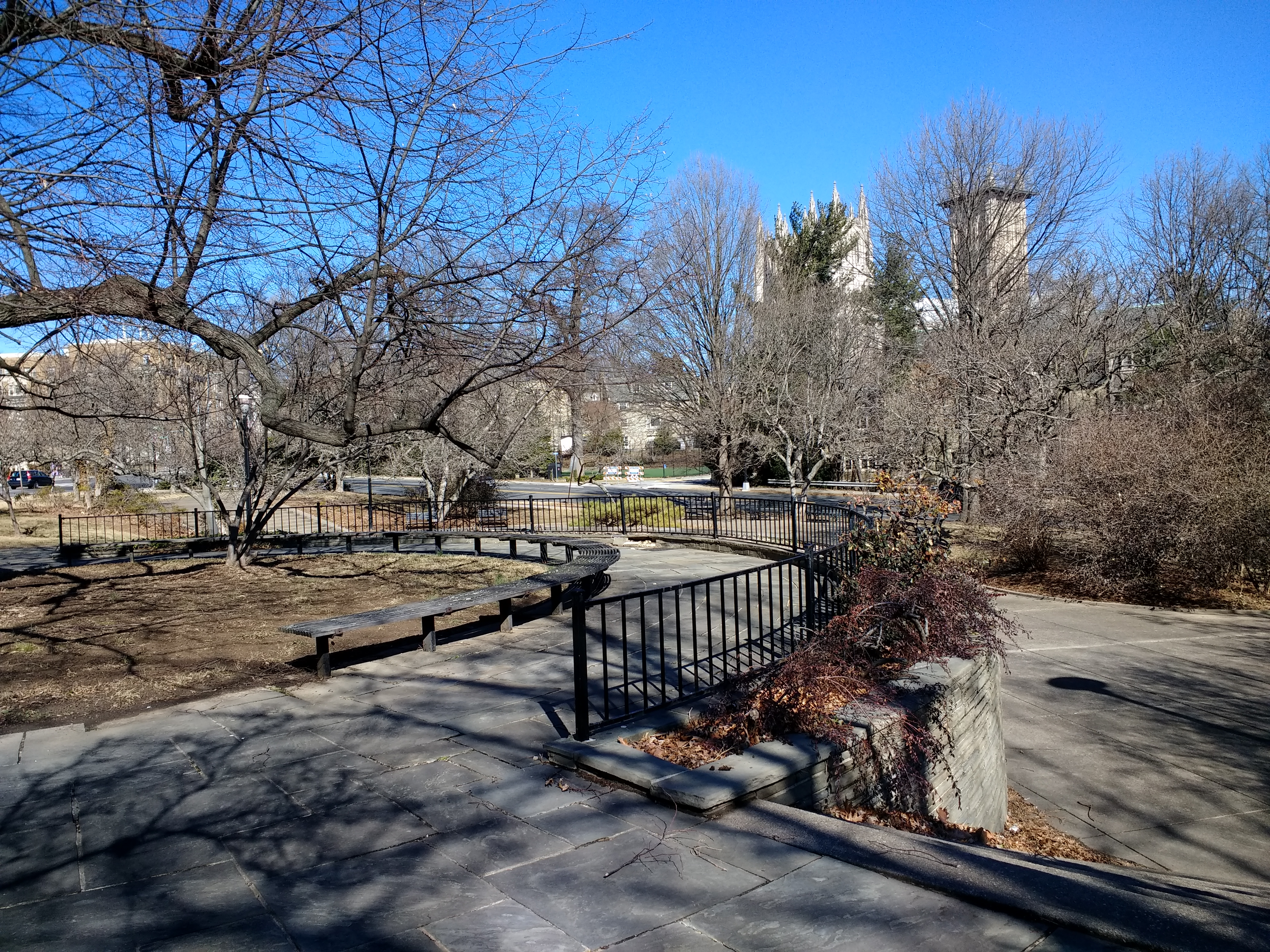

- Location within District of Columbia
- Interactive map of Bryce Park
- Location: Bounded by Massachusetts Ave., Wisconsin Ave. & Garfield St., NW Washington, D.C.
- Coordinates: 38°55′40.2″N 77°04′22″W
- Operator: National Park Service, Rock Creek Park

Bryce Park is an urban triangle park located in the District of Columbia neighborhood of Cathedral Heights; formed by the intersection of Massachusetts Ave., Wisconsin Ave. and Garfield St., NW. This 0.59 acre (2,369 m²) site is administered by the National Park Service as a part of Rock Creek Park, but is not contiguous with that park. Situated across Massachusetts Ave, NW from the Washington National Cathedral, the park provides pathways and benches for area pedestrians.

== History ==
At the time of establishment of the Washington, D.C., Bryce Park was mixed woodland and agricultural land in Montgomery County, Maryland. The land was acquired by the National Capital Park Commission pursuant to the Capper-Cramton Act of May 29, 1930. On November 17, 1965, Bryce park was dedicated by Under Secretary of the Interior John A. Carver, Jr. in honor of James Bryce. Bryce was a British professor at Oxford, historian, and politician. In 1888, he published his work The American Commonwealth for which he became well known in America. He served as British Ambassador to the United States of America from 1907 to 1913.

== Features ==
The park features no monuments or statues. It contains trees and walkways with park benches.
