= Peirce-Klingle Mansion =

Historic house in Washington, D.C., United States

- U.S. National Register of Historic Places
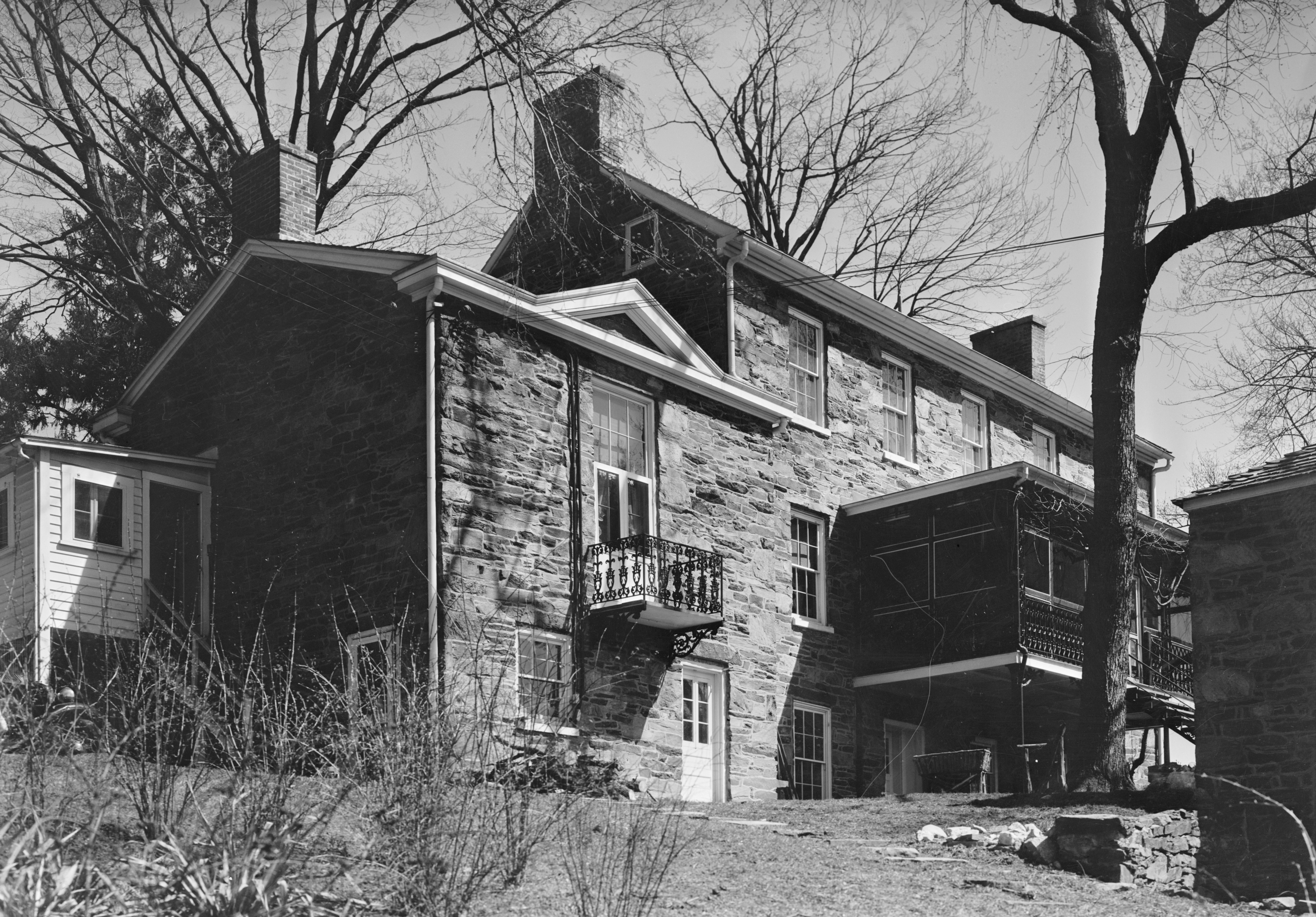

- Location within District of Columbia
- Location: 3545 Williamsburg Lane, NW; Washington, D.C.
- Coordinates: 38°56′18″N 77°03′00″W
- Built: 1823
- NRHP reference No.: 73000223
- Added to NRHP: October 10, 1973

Peirce-Klingle Mansion, also known as Linnaean Hill, is a historic house in Rock Creek Park in Washington, D.C. It has been listed on the District of Columbia Inventory of Historic Sites since 1964 and it was listed on the National Register of Historic Places in 1973. It is a contributing property in the Rock Creek Park Historic District.

== History ==
Joshua Peirce built the house in 1823 and named it Linnaean Hill after Carl Linnaeus, the Swedish botanist. Peirce, himself a horticulturist, introduced the box garden to Washington and supplied the first ornamental plantings to the White House, United States Capitol, and other government buildings. Notable members of Washington society, such as Senators Daniel Webster, John C. Calhoun, and Henry Clay were regular visitors to the house.

Because Joshua Peirce died without any children, his estate passed to his nephew, Joshua Peirce Klingle, who lived in the house with his wife until 1890. That year, the house was bought by the United States government as a part of Rock Creek Park. Public Works Administration funds were used to restore the house and grounds in 1937. It was leased by the government as a private residence until 1952. The Junior Nature Center then leased the building until 1959, when it was leased to the Junior League of Washington for its administrative offices. The National Park Service took over the residence in 1972 and used it to house the green scene programs.

== Architecture ==
The Peirce-Klingle Mansion is a three-story, ten-room house built in the Pennsylvania Dutch farmhouse style. The exterior is composed of blue and grey granite. The walls are 24 inches (61 cm) thick. An addition on the west side of the house was constructed in 1843. The poplar paneling in the stairwell and most of the mantelpiece are original to the house. A large fireplace that measures, 6 feet (2 m) long and 4 feet (1 m) high was uncovered during the 1937 renovation. A beehive oven was built into the wall beside it.

A two-story stone and wood frame barn and carriage house are located to the east of the main house. It was built into the side of the hill permitting each floor to have its own entrance corresponding to its ground level. The two-story utility house is located behind and to the east of the main house. It is constructed of granite similar to that of the main house and is part of the design of the terrace wall. Like the barn and carriage house, it has entrances that correspond to their own ground level. The lower floor, however, cannot be accessed from the upper-floor because there is no interior stairway. A brick chimney was constructed when a modern furnace and water heater were installed. On the west end of the terrace is the potting shed, which is similar in design to the utility house.
