= Maddox Branch =

Location
- Country: United States
- Federal district: District of Columbia

Physical characteristics
- Source
  - location: 38°55′44″N 77°05′39″W
- Mouth
  - location: 38°55′08″N 77°06′10″W Potomac River
  - elevation: 7 feet (2.1 m)

Maddox Branch is a tributary stream of the Potomac River in Washington, D.C., USA. The historic headwaters of the stream originate in the Tenleytown area in Northwest Washington. The stream flows from the campus of American University south about 1 mile (1.6 km) through Battery Kemble Park, under the Chesapeake and Ohio Canal to the Potomac.

== See also ==
- List of District of Columbia rivers
