= Missouri Avenue =

Thorougfare in Washington, D.C.

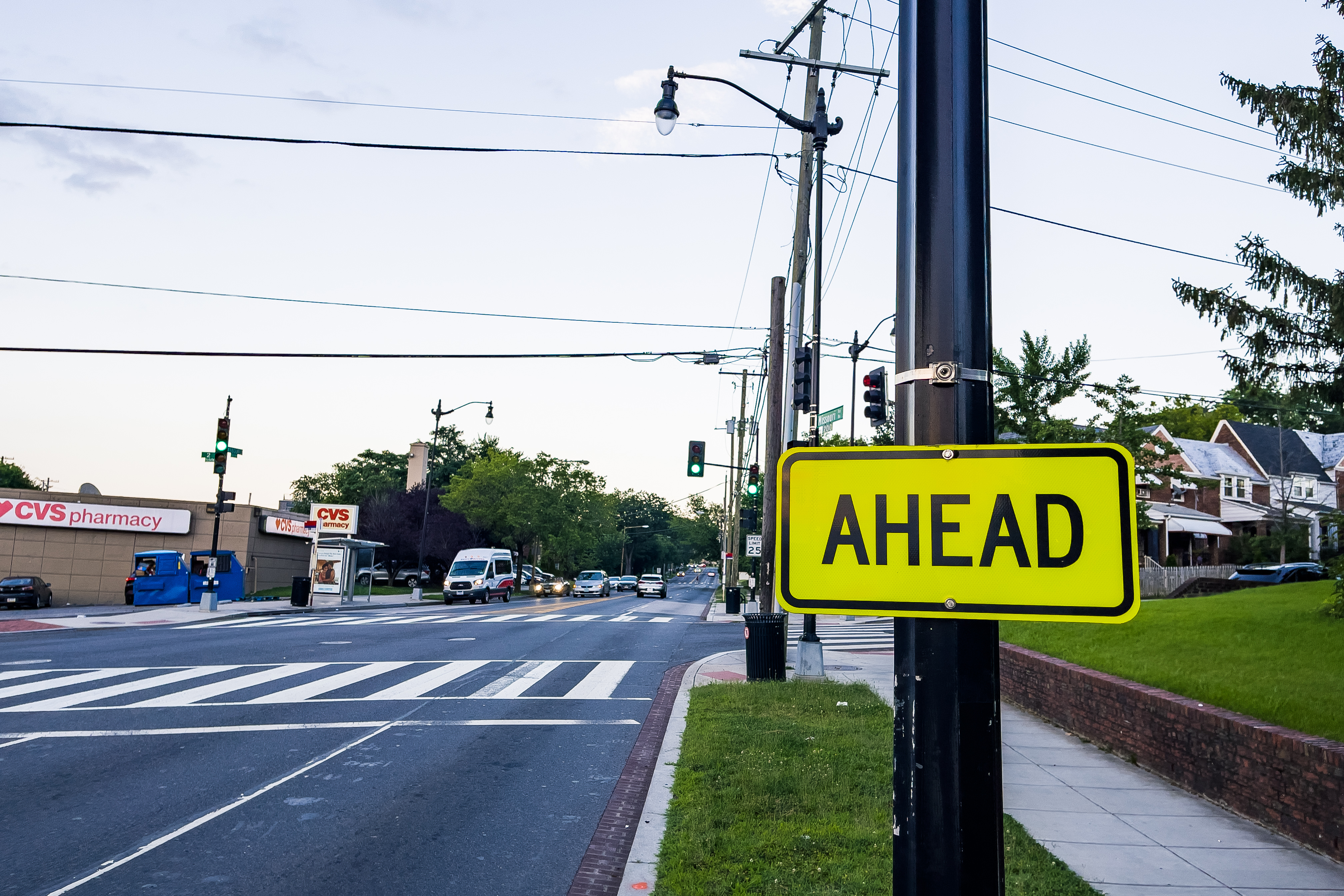
- Missouri Avenue at 2nd Street NW
- Length: 1.70 mi (2.74 km)
- Location: Washington, D.C.
- West end: Joyce Road eastbound exit 17th Street NW
- Major junctions: US 29 (Georgia Avenue)
- East end: North Capitol Street; Riggs Road

Missouri Avenue is a major diagonal west–east thoroughfare in the Northwest quadrant of Washington, D.C.

== History ==
Until 1946, Missouri Avenue was named Concord Avenue and was renamed for Harry S. Truman's home state of Missouri when he became president the year before. Previously, Missouri Avenue was the name of a street in the National Mall, which was demolished several years before.

== Route ==
Missouri Avenue begins as an eastbound one-way road at the Joyce Road ramp and 17th Street NW for 0.36 mi (0.58 km) before intersecting Military Road and becoming a 4-lane thoroughfare, continuing slightly southeast towards Georgia Avenue (US 29). Missouri Avenue makes a 0.02 mi (0.032 km) curve south along Georgia Avenue and continues further southeast, eventually ending at North Capitol Street where the road continues northeast as Riggs Road, which leads into Maryland.

== Major intersections ==
Location	mi	km	Destinations	Notes
Washington	0.00	0.00	Joyce Road eastbound exit 17th Street NW	Western terminus of Missouri Avenue
Washington	0.06	0.097	Military Road eastbound exit	
Washington	0.11	0.18	16th Street NW	Military Road westbound accessible via 16th Street NW interchange
Washington	0.16	0.26	Military Road westbound entrance	
Washington	0.27	0.43	14th Street NW	
Washington	0.36	0.58	Military Road	End of one-way section of Missouri Avenue
Washington	0.49	0.79	13th Street NW	
Washington	0.58	0.93	US 29 (Georgia Avenue)	
Washington	0.71	1.14	9th Street NW	
Washington	0.81	1.30	8th Street NW	
Washington	1.06	1.71	5th Street NW	
Washington	1.26	2.03	3rd Street NW	
Washington	1.35	2.17	Kansas Avenue; Kennedy Street	
Washington	1.43	2.30	2nd Street NW	
Washington	1.62	2.61	New Hampshire Avenue	
Washington	1.70	2.74	North Capitol Street	Eastern terminus of Missouri Avenue; Continuation beyond eastern terminus as Riggs Road
1.000 mi = 1.609 km; 1.000 km = 0.621 mi
