= Barnard Hill Park =

Park in Washington, D.C., U.S.

- Location within District of Columbia
- Interactive map of Barnard Hill Park
- Location: Bounded by 24th St., between Randolph St. & Eastern Ave., NE Washington, D.C.
- Coordinates: 38°56′21.3″N 76°58′14.5″W
- Operator: National Park Service, Rock Creek Park

Barnard Hill Park is an urban park located in the Washington, D.C. neighborhood of Woodridge; it also abuts the Maryland city of Mount Rainier. This 21.82 acre (88,294 m^{2}) site is administered by the National Park Service as a part of Rock Creek Park, but is not contiguous with that park. Located on the border with Maryland, it is the eastern end of a corridor of contiguous greenspace from Fort Totten Park to Barnard Hill.

== History ==
At the time of establishment of the District of Columbia, Barnard Hill was agricultural land in Prince George's County, Maryland. Survey of the District boundaries by Andrew Ellicott and others in 1791 – 1792 placed the location inside the boundary. The park was acquired by the National Capital Park Commission pursuant to the Capper-Cramton Act of May 29, 1930. The park was named after Brigadier General John G. Barnard who supervised the construction of the forts protecting Washington, D.C. during the Civil War.

== Features ==
The park features no monuments or statues. It contains a mix of open space and a wooded ridge with secluded picnic tables. The southeast corner of the park includes a baseball diamond.
