= Little Forest Park =

Park in Washington, D.C., U.S.

Little Forest
- Francis G. Newlands Park
- Location within District of Columbia
- Location: Military Rd., Between 28th & 30th Sts., NW Washington, D.C.
- Coordinates: 38°57′43.1″N 77°03′31.3″W
- Area: 8.78 acres (3.55 ha)
- Created: 1942, transferred to NPS in 1948
- Operator: National Park Service, Rock Creek Park

Little Forest Park, formerly Francis G. Newlands Park, an undeveloped park located in the District of Columbia neighborhood of Chevy Chase; North of Military Rd., between 28th & 30th Sts., NW. This 8.78 acre (3.55 hectares) site is administered by the National Park Service as a part of Rock Creek Park

== History ==
When the District was authorized by Congress in 1790, the land in the area of the park was farmland raising wheat and tobacco, but the park was likely wood land as it was too steep and rough for farming. It remained as farmland until the late 1880s. Beginning in 1887, Francis G. Newlands, later to become a member of United States House of Representatives and United States Senate from Nevada and William Morris Stewart, former Senator from Nevada, began purchasing property west of Rock Creek Park. They formed the Chevy Chase Land Development Company, which developed the neighborhoods of Chevy Chase, Washington, D.C.; and Chevy Chase, Maryland.

In 1939, Edith McAllister Newlands, widow of Senator Newlands, died and left 3 acres that she designated by her as "little forest" to the District as a memorial to her husband. In 1942, her estate transferred the property to the District, while her daughters transferred an additional 5.7 acres. In 1948, the land was transferred to the National Park Service under the condition that it be held in memory of Senator Newlands. It remains as a memorial to the present day.

As of 2011, the National Park Service lists the park as Little Forest - Formerly Francis G. Newlands Park in an inventory of properties in the District.

== Landmarks and features ==
The park remains mostly undeveloped other than a couple of walking trails established by residents in the neighborhood.
