= Rock Creek Park Golf Course =

Golf course in Rock Creek Park, Washington, D.C.

Coordinates: 38.9667°N 77.0403°W

- Interactive map of Rock Creek Park Golf Course

Club information
- Location: Washington, D.C.
- Established: 1909
- Type: Public
- Operator: National Links Trust
- Website: https://www.playdcgolf.com/rock-creek-park-golf/

Rock Creek Park Golf Course
- Par: 65
- Length: 4,886 yards (4,468 m)

Rock Creek Park Golf Course (also known as Rock Creek Golf Course) is a golf course in Washington, D.C., in the United States. The entire course lies within Rock Creek Park, a national park owned and maintained by the National Park Service division of the United States Department of the Interior.

The course is bordered by Military Road to the south, Rock Creek and Beach Drive to the west, Sherrill Drive NW to the north, and 16th Street NW to the east. Its entrance is at the intersection of 16th Street NW and Rittenhouse Street NW. Walter Reed Army Medical Center is immediately to the northwest.

Rock Creek Park Golf Course is one of three golf courses in Washington, D.C., along with East Potomac Park Golf Course and Langston Golf Course, all owned by the National Park Service. Since 2020, they have been operated under a 50-year lease to National Links Trust, a non-profit organization.

== Course description ==
Rock Creek Golf Course is known as a challenging course. The front nine holes are short par 4s and long par 3s, although the broad fairways have some elevation differences. The fairways of the back nine are tight, with dense deciduous woods on either side. The back nine has even larger elevation changes, and many of the greens are quite small. In 1996, The Washington Post described the course this way:

"Want a unique, virtually free, profoundly humbling golf experience? Try the back nine at Rock Creek Golf Club. Rock Creek is one of two remaining public golf courses in the city, not as well known as East Potomac Park perhaps, but unforgettable once you've scrambled up the precipitous slopes in the shadow of towering trees, dodged deer and leaped deep ravines in a single bound. And that's in the fairway. The front nine is so wide open it's boring. The backside seems to have been designed by a mountain goat. Not a flat lie in the place, but one spectacular vista after another, not to mention almost comically devious golfing challenges."

Services at the course include a large putting green, snack bar, and golf school. Players have criticized the maintenance of the course. However, at least one reviewer says that Rock Creek's "weedy fairways, shaggy greens, [and] no frills" clubhouse is "honest" municipal golf.

== History ==
Citizens in the Brightwood neighborhood proposed building a golf course in Rock Creek Park in January 1905, some 15 years after its founding. The United States Army Corps of Engineers, which controlled the city and the parks within it at the time, approved the plan in November 1906 despite critics who argued that money should be spent on public health projects first. Construction began in 1907.

The nine-hole course opened on July 1, 1909. The course's first clubhouse was a former farmhouse owned by Horatio Plant, and its first concessionaires were N.B. Frost and H.D. Miller. After a year, the concession was turned over to Severine G. Leoffler Sr., who had risen from extreme poverty to own a popular local restaurant and then begun managing National Park Service courses in the city in 1921. Leoffler would administer Rock Creek Park Golf Course and other city golf courses for the next four decades.

Rock Creek Golf Course proved popular in its first few years. In July 1924, the Corps of Engineers agreed to expand the course to 18 holes. However, construction needs were so extensive that the entire course was shuttered in December 1924. The 18-hole course re-opened in 1926; the first golfers to tee off were four members of the United States Congress, who hit the first ball at 5:53 a.m.

A minor fire damaged the clubhouse in January 1933; a major one burned it to the ground in March 1937.

In 1941, recreational facilities in D.C. became integrated, in part because of activists who demanded equal access to the city's golf courses.

Maintenance of the course was a major problem in the 1940s. Golfers complained about the course so vehemently that U.S. Senate Subcommittee on Public Lands began an investigation and asked the Park Service to delay renewing the contract for Leoffler's firm. A consultant criticized the firm's stewardship of the course.

The firm built a new clubhouse on the course in 1965. In 1968, Leoffler told the Park Service to close the course, as it was making no money.

The number of rounds played at Rock Creek rose from 9,500 in 1979 to 41,500 in 1980, but the following year, the National Park Service threatened to close the course. A Park Service report concluded that the course had been allowed to seriously deteriorate since 1965, despite about $100,000 in course repairs in the past three years. The Leoffler company declined to renew its concessions contract in 1981, and the National Park Service said it would close the park without a new concessionaire. In mid-1982, however, a management team composed of local businessmen James R. Brock, Frank Coates, and William Torpey took over course management, leading to a significant increase in rounds played. The new management team lasted only a year. In late 1982, the National Park Service awarded the concession to a new company, Golf Course Specialists, Inc.

Rock Creek Golf Course came close to closing again in the 1990s. The National Park Service began soliciting public input on a new master plan for Rock Creek Park, the first such document in 80 years. The Park Service proposed four plans for comment, one of which would have closed the golf course. After eight years of debate and study, a new master plan was adopted which retained Rock Creek Park Golf Course.

In 2019, the back nine (holes 10-18) were closed indefinitely due to course conditions. The course's web site says, "The back 9 will be closed until safety renovations can be completed in a future long-term lease."

That same year, the National Park Service issued a request for proposals to take over operating the city's three golf courses when Golf Course Specialists's lease expired on Sept. 30, 2020.

In October 2020, the National Park Service signed an agreement with National Links Trust, a year-old non-profit organization, to operate the course along with the two other courses in DC. The announcement says that they plan to "construct a new practice area, redevelop the clubhouse, create new spaces for educational programs, redesign the course to reflect the original intent of designer William Flynn and construct an 18-hole putting course." By 2024, the organization had further developed its plan, which now called for adding a driving range, a putting course, and other amenities. At the end of 2025, the Trump administration prematurely terminated the lease agreement for this course and for the other two courses managed by the National Links Trust.

== Bibliography ==
- "Col. Biddle Wins Praise." Washington Post. January 19, 1905.
- Cullen, Bob. Why Golf?: The Mystery of the Game Revisited. Paperback ed. New York: Simon & Schuster, 2002.
- "Golf Course to Be Ideal." Washington Post. September 1, 1907.
- "E. Potomac Park Public Golf Course Gets New Manager." Washington Post. January 5, 1983.
- Eisen, Jack. "Golf Course to Reopen." Washington Post. April 8, 1983.
- "Fire Destroys Rock Creek's Golf House." Washington Post. March 18, 1937.
- "Fire Hits Clubhouse at Rock Creek Links." Washington Post. January 21, 1933.
- Ham, Bus. "Rock Creek Golf Regulars Miss Homey, Rustic Touch of Old Days." Washington Post. January 21, 1965.
- Hodge, Paul. "1 of 3 Public Links in D.C. Closed." Washington Post. December 20, 1981.
- Hodge, Paul. "Smaller Public Golf Course Sought." Washington Post. September 29, 1982.
- Karlin, Adam and St. Louis, Regis. Washington, D.C. Oakland, Calif.: Lonely Planet, 2010.
- "Only A Half Course." Washington Post. May 8, 1909.
- "Oppose New Golf Course." Washington Post. December 23, 1906.
- "Plan 18-Hole Golf Course at Rock Creek." Washington Post. July 22, 1924.
- "Provide Free Sports." Washington Post. November 6, 1906.
- "Public Golf Links Soon." Washington Post. November 3, 1906.
- Reel, Monte. "A Clash of Visions Over Rock Creek Park." Washington Post. June 24, 2004.
- "Rock Creek Course to Close for Repairs." Washington Post. December 28, 1924.
- "Rock Creek's Back Nine: A Steep Challenge." Washington Post. June 20, 1999.
- "Rock Creek's Links Are Opened." Washington Post. April 3, 1926.
- Sehlinger, Bob; Surkiewicz, Joe; and Zibart, Eve. The Unofficial Guide to Washington, D.C. New York: Prentice Hall Travel, 1994.
- Thompson, John. National Geographic Traveler: Washington, D.C. Washington, D.C.: National Geographic, 2008.
- Walsh, Jack. "Expert Finds Faulty Golf Courses Here." Washington Post. April 3, 1949.
- West, Henry Litchfield. "Rock Creek Links Concessions Let." Washington Post. March 8, 1923.
- Wheeler, Linda. "Weighing Future of Rock Creek." Washington Post. July 27, 1996.
