= Rock Creek Park =

Urban park in Washington, D.C., U.S.

- IUCN category V (protected landscape/seascape)
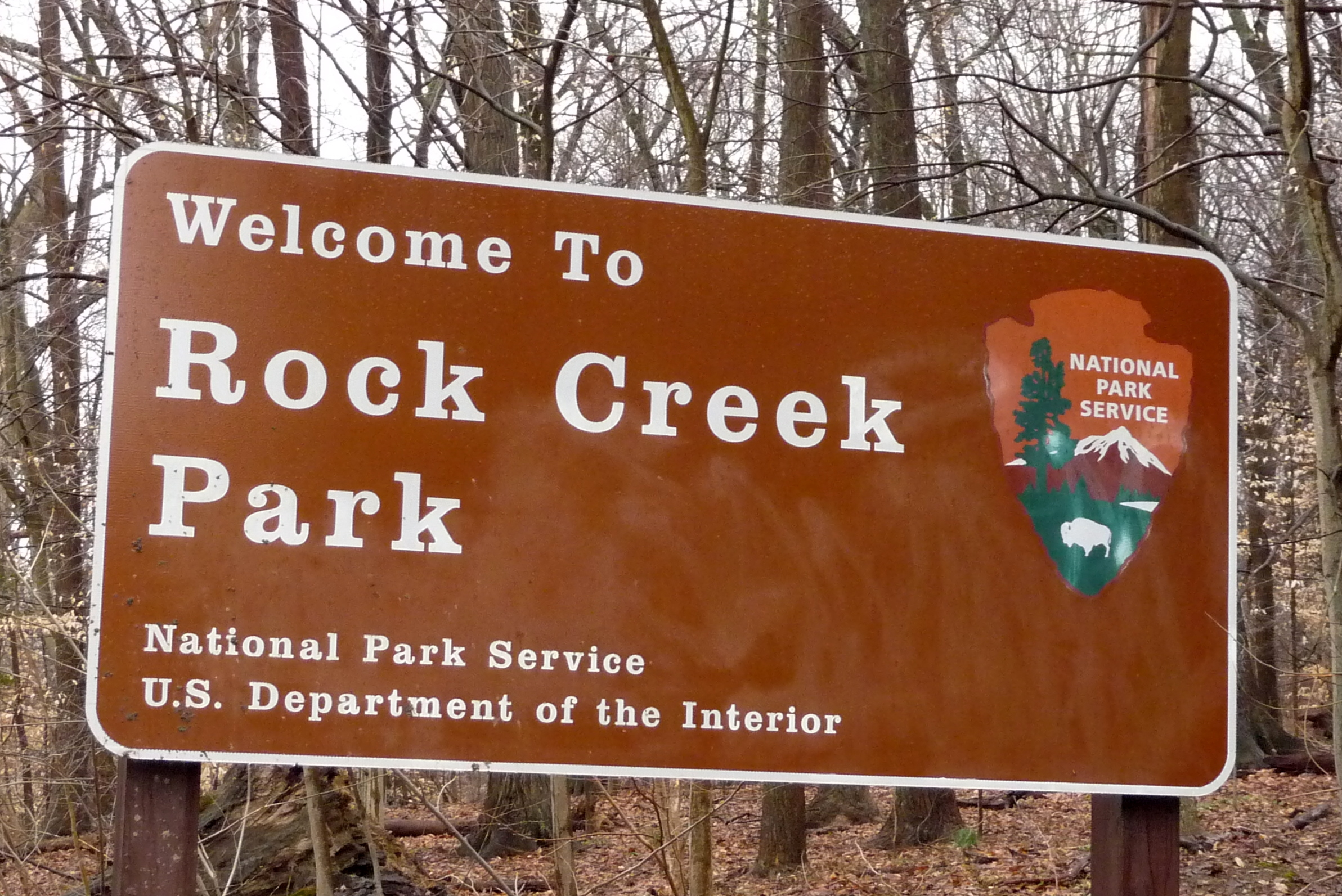
- The entrance to Rock Creek Park at its Maryland border entrance in 2010

- Location within District of Columbia Location within the United States
- Location: Washington, D.C., U.S.
- Nearest city: Washington, D.C.
- Area: 1,755 acres (7.10 km^{2})
- Established: September 27, 1890
- Visitors: 2,026,156 (in 2022)
- Governing body: National Park Service
- Website: Rock Creek Park
- Rock Creek Park Historic District
- U.S. National Register of Historic Places
- Location: From Klingle Road in Washington, D.C. to Montgomery County, Maryland border
- Coordinates: 38°57′27″N 77°2′42″W
- Area: 1,754 acres (2.7 sq mi; 7.1 km^{2})
- Built: 1820s (Peirce Mill); 1897–1912 (Park facilities)
- Architect: Frederick Law Olmsted Jr., John Charles Olmsted
- Architectural style: Late 19th and 20th Century Revivals, Early Republic, and NPS Rustic
- NRHP reference No.: 91001524
- Added to NRHP: October 23, 1991

Rock Creek Park is a large urban park that bisects the Northwest quadrant of Washington, D.C. Created by Act of Congress in 1890, the park comprises 1,754 acres (2.74 mi^{2}, 7.10 km^{2}), generally along Rock Creek, a tributary of the Potomac River.

More than two million people visit the park each year, many to use recreation facilities such as its golf course; hiking, biking, and equestrian trails; tennis center; nature center; playgrounds, and picnic facilities.

The park is administered by the National Park Service, whose Rock Creek Park administrative unit administers dozens of other federally owned properties in the District of Columbia, including Meridian Hill Park, the Old Stone House in Georgetown, and some of the Fort Circle Parks, a series of batteries and forts built to defend the nation's capital during the American Civil War.

The Rock Creek Historic District was listed on the National Register of Historic Places on October 23, 1991.

== History ==
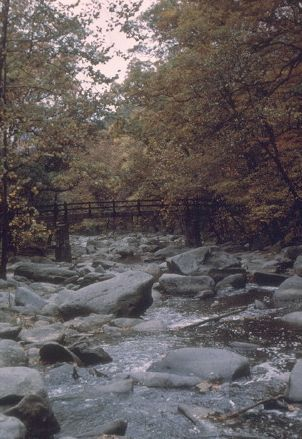
Rock Creek

Rock Creek Park was established by an act of Congress signed into law by President Benjamin Harrison on September 27, 1890, following advocacy by Charles C. Glover and other civic leaders and in the wake of the creation of the National Zoo the preceding year.

It was only the third national park established by the U.S., following Yellowstone in 1872 and Mackinac National Park in 1875. Sequoia was created at the same time, and Yosemite shortly thereafter. In 1933, Rock Creek Park became part of the newly formed National Capital Parks unit of the National Park Service.

The Rock Creek Park Act authorized the purchase of no more than 2,000 acres (810 ha) of land, extending north from Klingle Ford Bridge in the District of Columbia (approximately the northern limit of the National Zoo), to be "perpetually dedicated and set apart as a public park or pleasure ground for the benefit and enjoyment of the people of the United States". The Act also called for regulations to "provide for the preservation from injury or spoliation of all timber, animals, or curiosities within said park, and their retention in their natural condition, as nearly as possible". Rock Creek Park is the oldest natural urban park in the National Park System. Park construction began in 1897.

In 1913, Congress authorized creation of the Rock Creek and Potomac Parkway and extended the park along a narrow corridor from the zoo to the mouth of Rock Creek at the Potomac River. The parkway remains a major traffic thoroughfare, especially along the portion south of the zoo.

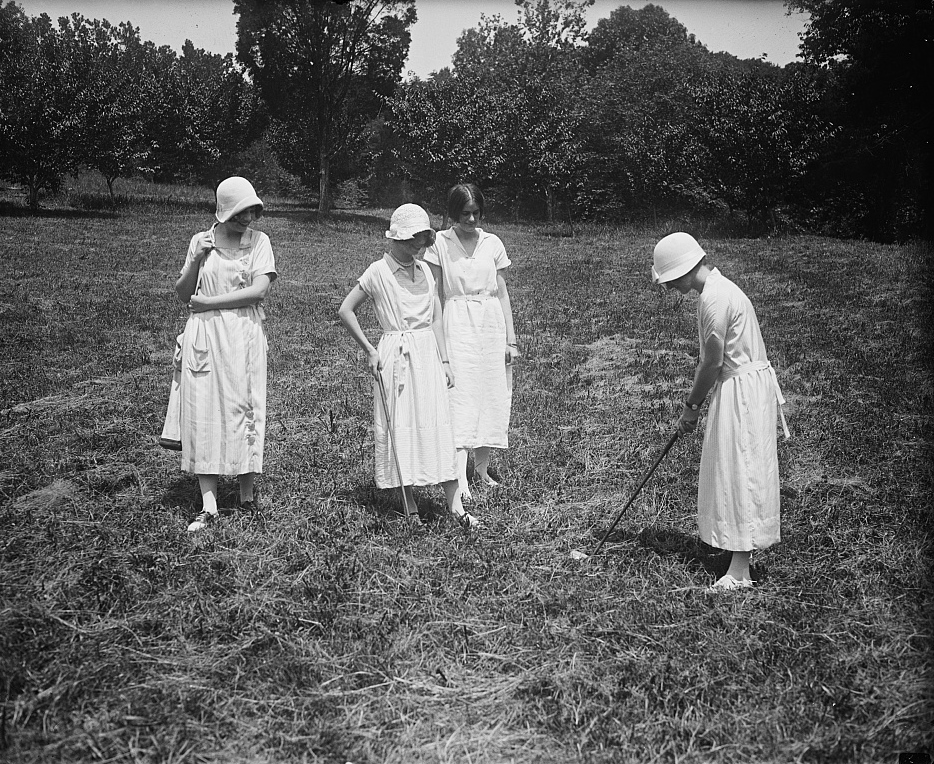
Women playing golf at Rock Creek Park, 1924

The park's golf course, designed by William Flynn, was opened with nine holes in 1923 and expanded three years later to 18. Like the rest of the city's public courses, it was segregated until 1941, when U.S. Secretary of the Interior Harold Ickes ordered them all opened to African Americans.

In the 1980s, hundreds of stones removed from the United States Capitol during a renovation were stored in the park. The loose pile, two stories high, was a popular, if unmarked and unsanctioned, attraction, and their removal in 2022 drew local and even national attention.

By the late 1990s, a popular conception had arisen that the park was unsafe. This persisted despite crime data, provided by D.C. police and park officials, that showed that the park saw fewer crimes than surrounding neighborhoods. The misperception was fed by the 2002 discovery in the park of the skeletal remains of Chandra Levy, a federal intern whose disappearance had attracted national media attention.

== Description ==
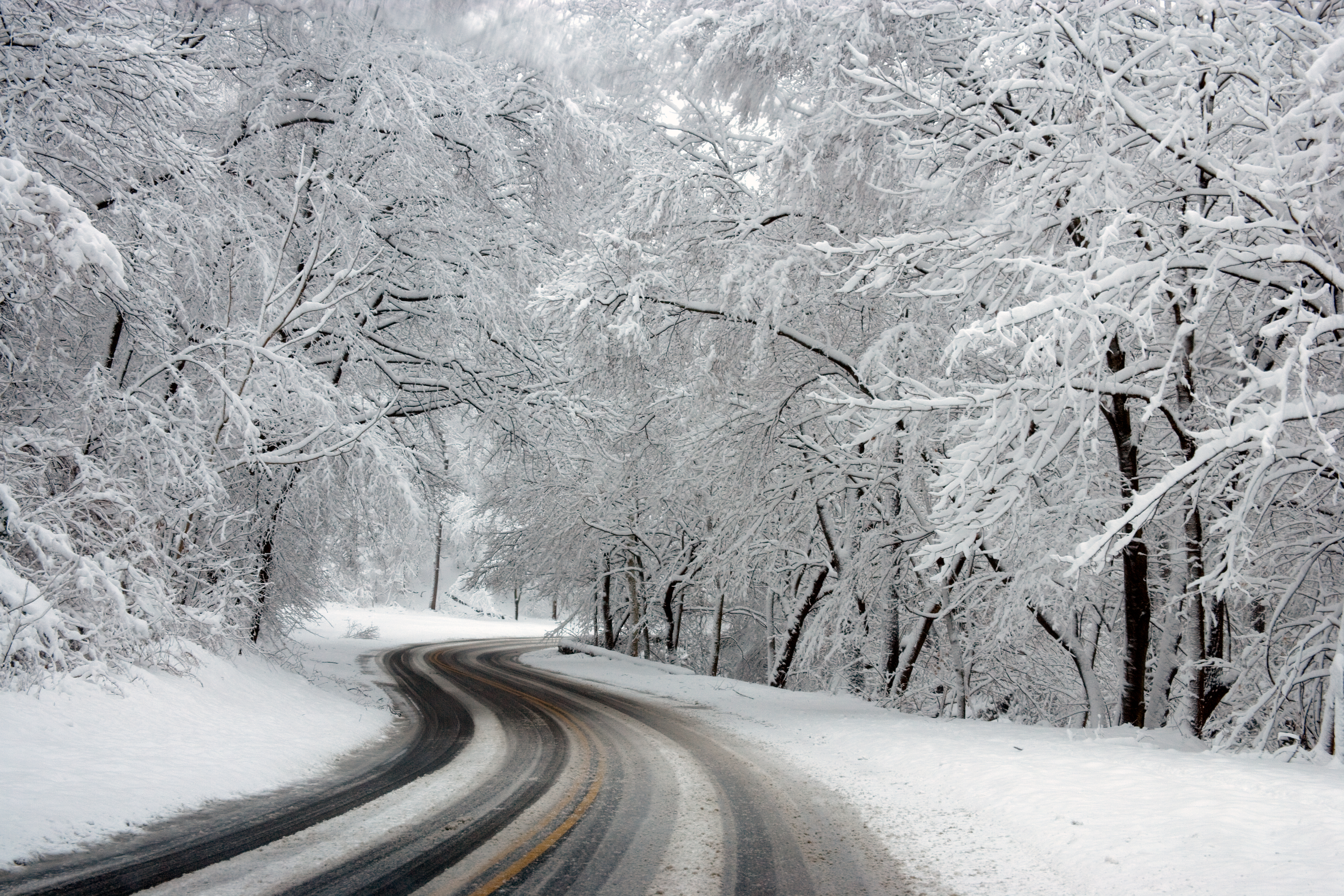
The park in winter

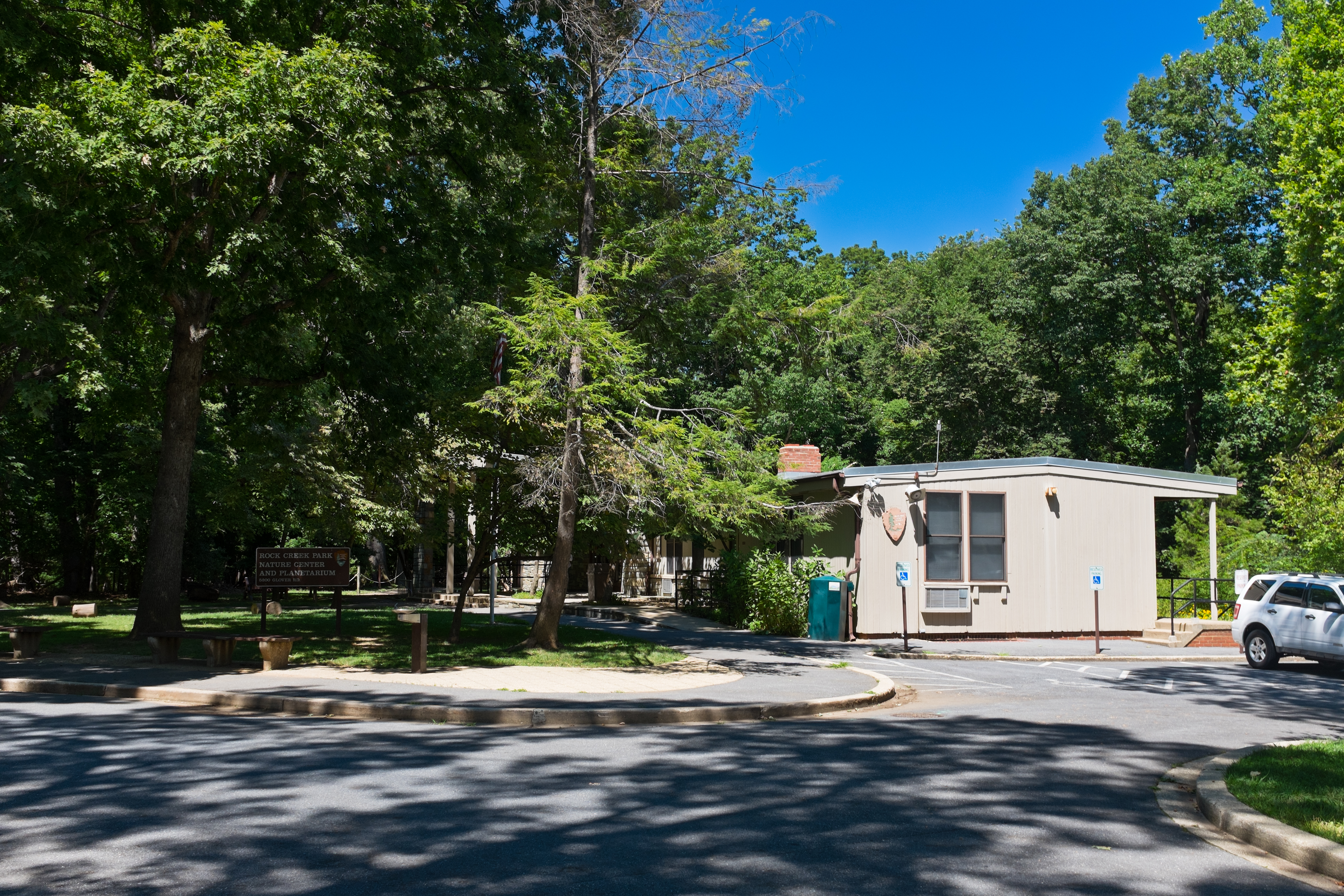
Rock Creek Nature Center and Planetarium

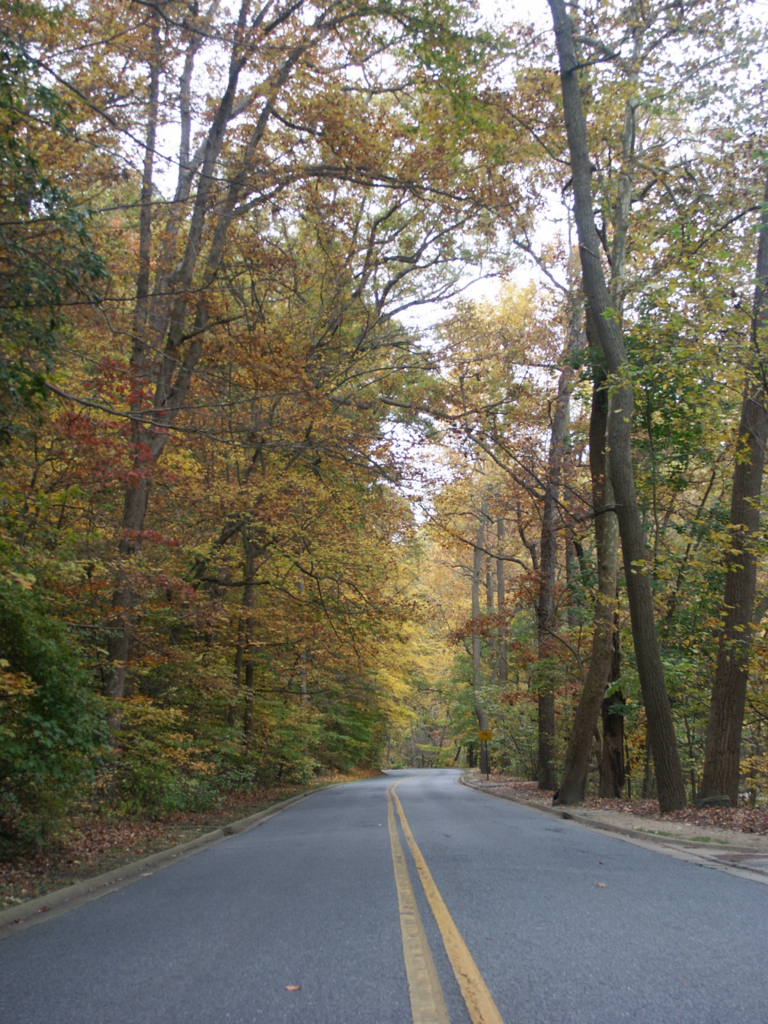
Beach Drive in the autumn

The main section of the park comprises 1754 acres (2.74 mi^{2}, 7.10 km^{2}), along the Rock Creek Valley. Including the other green areas the park administers (Glover Archbold Park, Montrose Park, Dumbarton Oaks Park, Meridian Hill Park, Battery Kemble Park, Palisades Park, Whitehaven Park, etc.), it encompasses more than 2000 acres (3 mi^{2}, 8 km^{2}).

The parklands follow the course of Rock Creek across the D.C.-Maryland border to connect with Rock Creek Stream Valley Park and Rock Creek Regional Park in Montgomery County. The Maryland parks are operated by the Maryland-National Capital Park and Planning Commission.

The Rock Creek Historic District was listed on the National Register of Historic Places on October 23, 1991.

Recreation facilities include a golf course; equestrian trails; sport venues, including a tennis stadium which hosts major professional events; a nature center and planetarium; the Carter Barron Amphitheatre, an outdoor concert venue; and picnic and playground facilities. Rock Creek Park also maintains cultural exhibits, including the Peirce Mill. Rock Creek is a popular venue for jogging, cycling, and inline skating, especially on the long, winding Beach Drive, portions of which are closed to vehicles on weekends.

A number of the city's outstanding bridges, such as the Lauzun's Legion, Dumbarton, Taft and the Duke Ellington bridges, span the creek and ravine.

Among the park's few monuments is a pink granite bench on Beach Drive south of the Peirce Mill, dedicated on November 7, 1936, by President Franklin Delano Roosevelt in memory of former French ambassador Jean Jules Jusserand. In 2014, it was named "best obscure memorial" by Washington City Paper.

=== Horse Center ===
Rock Creek Park Horse Center, founded in 1972, is located in the middle of the park near the Nature Center. The barn, run by Guest Services Inc, has 57 stalls, two outdoor rings, one indoor ring, and three bluestone turnout paddocks. The stable provides trail rides, pony rides, and lessons for the public, along with boarding for private horses. The stable primarily teaches English riding, with an emphasis on lower-level jumping and dressage.

The barn is also home to Rock Creek Riders, a therapeutic riding program for adults and children with special needs in the D.C. area. Past participants in the program include brain-injured veterans of the conflicts in Iraq and Afghanistan and people with autism, cerebral palsy, or attention deficit disorder. The program is volunteer-run and relies on donations and contributions for funding. Previously, Rock Creek Riders has worked with the United States Mounted Police, National Park Service, Wounded Warrior Project, and the Caisson Platoon Equine Assisted Programs to provide these therapeutic riding services.

=== Peirce Mill ===
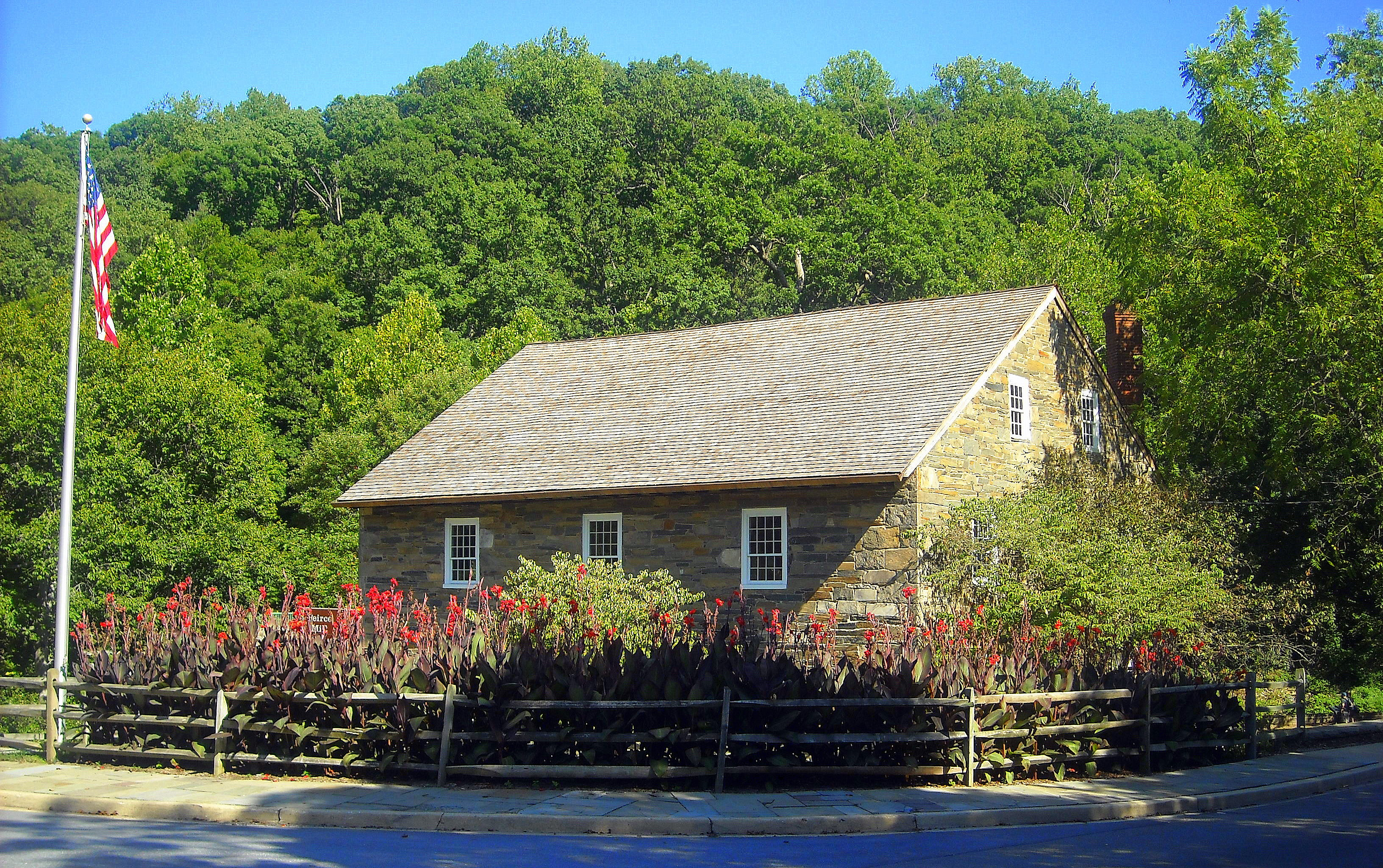
Peirce Mill

Peirce Mill is a water-powered grist mill in Rock Creek Park. There were at least eight mills along Rock Creek within what is now Washington, D.C., and many more farther upstream in Montgomery County, Maryland. Of those eight, only Peirce Mill is still standing.

It was built in the 1820s by Isaac Peirce, along with a house, barn, and other buildings. It was later owned by a son, Joshua Peirce, and a nephew Peirce Shoemaker. It became part of Rock Creek Park in 1892.

The mill was listed on the National Register in 1969 as Peirce Mill. It was repaired and re-opened October 15, 2011.

The Peirce Carriage Barn, adjacent to the mill, is the National Park Service point of contact. The barn was part of the Peirce estate built in 1810 and used as a tack room and carriage barn. The barn is now a mini-museum containing information on the milling process, the Peirce family estate and other mills along the Rock Creek Valley.

=== Rock Creek multi-use trails ===
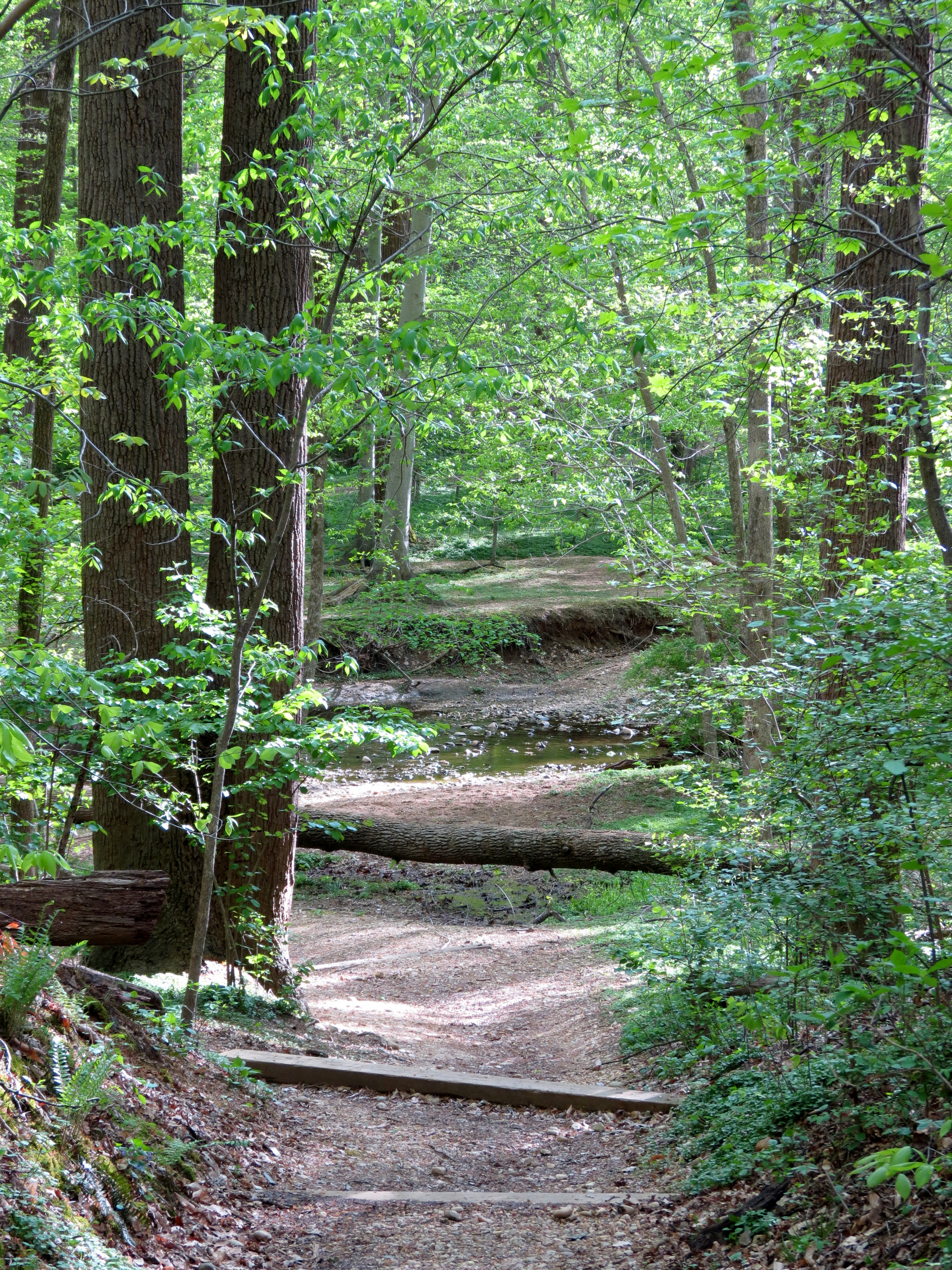
Western Ridge Trail

A set of hiker/biker trails in the park serve both commuters and recreational users. The mainline trail extends for about 1.6 km (0.99 mi) from Broad Branch Road to the southern end of the park where the trail continues several miles to Arlington Memorial Bridge and Hains Point. The northern trails consist of a loop along Bingham Road, Oregon Avenue, Beach Road, and Military Road with spurs along Oregon to the Nature Center and Wise Road. In the park, the mainline trail starts at the parking lot just west of the creek and south of Broad Branch. From there, it is co-located with a section of the Western Ridge Trail south past Peirce Mill to a trail bridge over the creek, where the two separate. After a short distance on the east side of the creek, it crosses back to the west side on Bluff Bridge. Dating back to 1934, it is the oldest part of the trail in the park, and the same age as the Devil's Chair and Saddle Club Bridges farther south. The trail remains on the west side until just south of Klingle Bridge where it crosses back to the east and leaves the park to enter the Zoo property.

The Park Service began to experiment with trails in August 1963 when mile-long Ross Drive was closed to cars from 6 am to noon on Sundays, but planning for a separate trail system didn't begin until 1965, when the federal "Trails for America" report identified a trail along Rock Creek as one of many trails for the D.C. area. That same year, the "Fort Park System, A Re-evaluation Study of Fort Drive, Washington, D.C." report suggested running the Circle Fort Trail through the park.

Planning for trails led to action. In January 1967, NPS announced weekend road closures in April over a 5-mile loop in the center of the park, made up of Beach, Ross, Ridge and Joyce and they announced a plan to build a trail from Military Road to the District boundary. That trail, the first hiker-biker trail in the park, was built in the summer of 1967. The crushed bluestone trail was constructed from the Nature Center, past Wise Road to a turnaround loop just southwest of Beach Drive and the D.C. boundary.

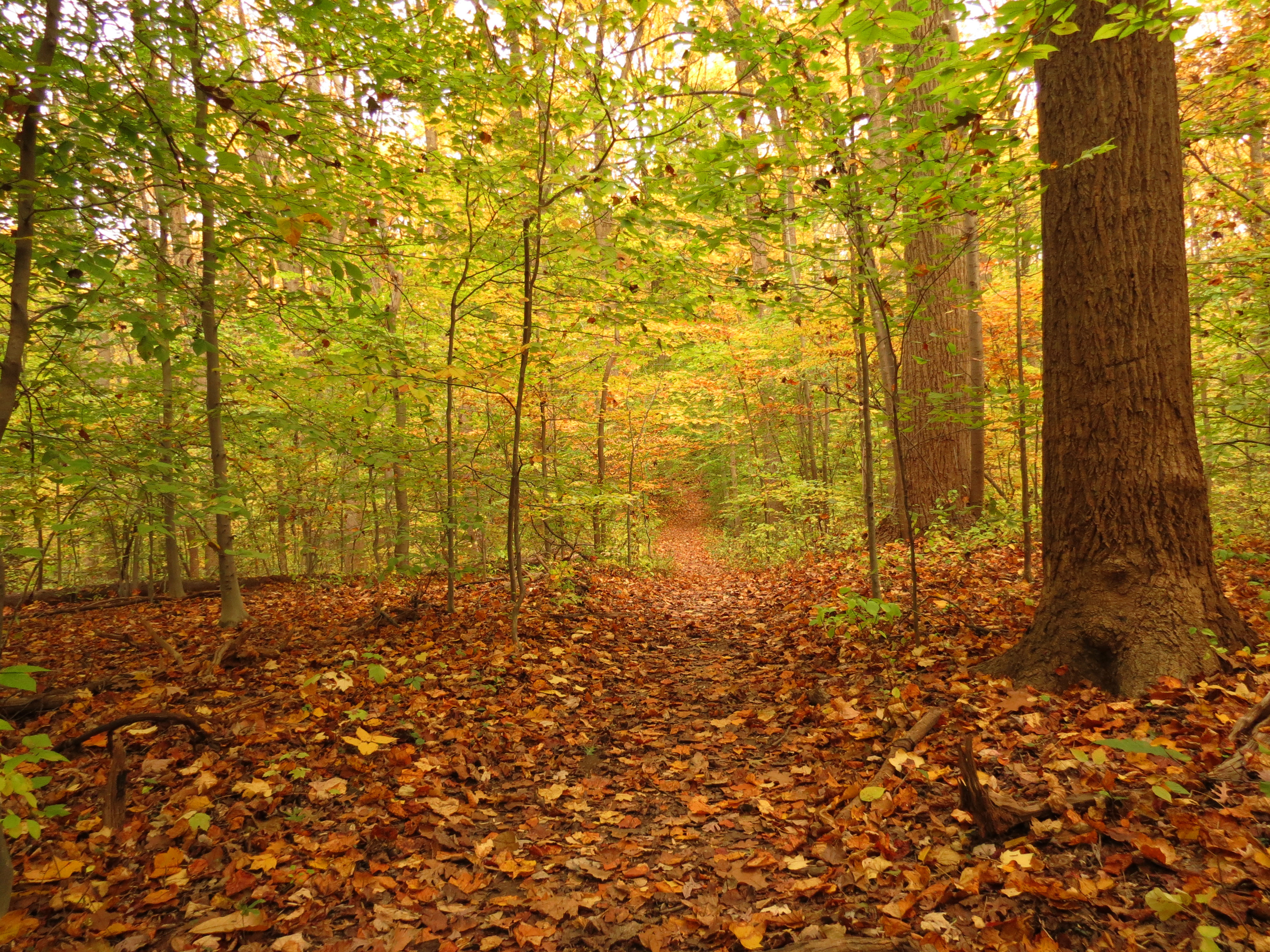
Fall foliage in the park.

Over the next few months, NPS announced plans to add additional unpaved trails along Military Road from Oregon to Beach, along Wise to Fenwick Branch, beside Fenwick Branch to the District boundary and through Pinehurst Parkway Park (most of which were never constructed). In 1968, they built a second trail along Beach from Joyce to Bingham. By 1969, the two existing northern trails were connected with a trail along Bingham from Oregon to Beach. Later that year, NPS built the final section of the loop along Military between Oregon and Beach. By 1972, NPS had paved all of these trails except the section north of Wise to the DC Boundary. The section along Military Road was originally intended to serve as part of the Fort Circle Trail, passing by Fort DeRussy, but work on the Fort Circle Trail ended in the 1970s with only three parts, the one in Rock Creek, a section of the C&O Canal towpath and another from Fort Stanton to Fort Mahon, completed. Over time, the Rock Creek section ceased to be viewed as part of the Fort Circle Trail system. Between 1979 and 1981, the unpaved trail and turnaround loop north of Wise was abandoned.

Farther south, a trail along the creek was extended into the park in 1972. A trail along the Potomac built prior to 1967 was extended along the Rock Creek and Potomac Parkway in 1971 and then into the park in 1972. It was built on a bridle path that dated back to the early 20th century up to the Bluff Bridge, which was built in 1934. The section of bridle path used between P and Q streets was built in conjunction with the Pentagon, as that project needed dirt and the park service needed dirt removed. These first sections of trail were 4 to 8 feet wide with rough pavement, steep slopes, poor visibility and sharp curves. By 1977, the trail was extended to Broad Branch Road, crossing the creek at Bluff Bridge and twice on newly constructed "breakaway" bridges.

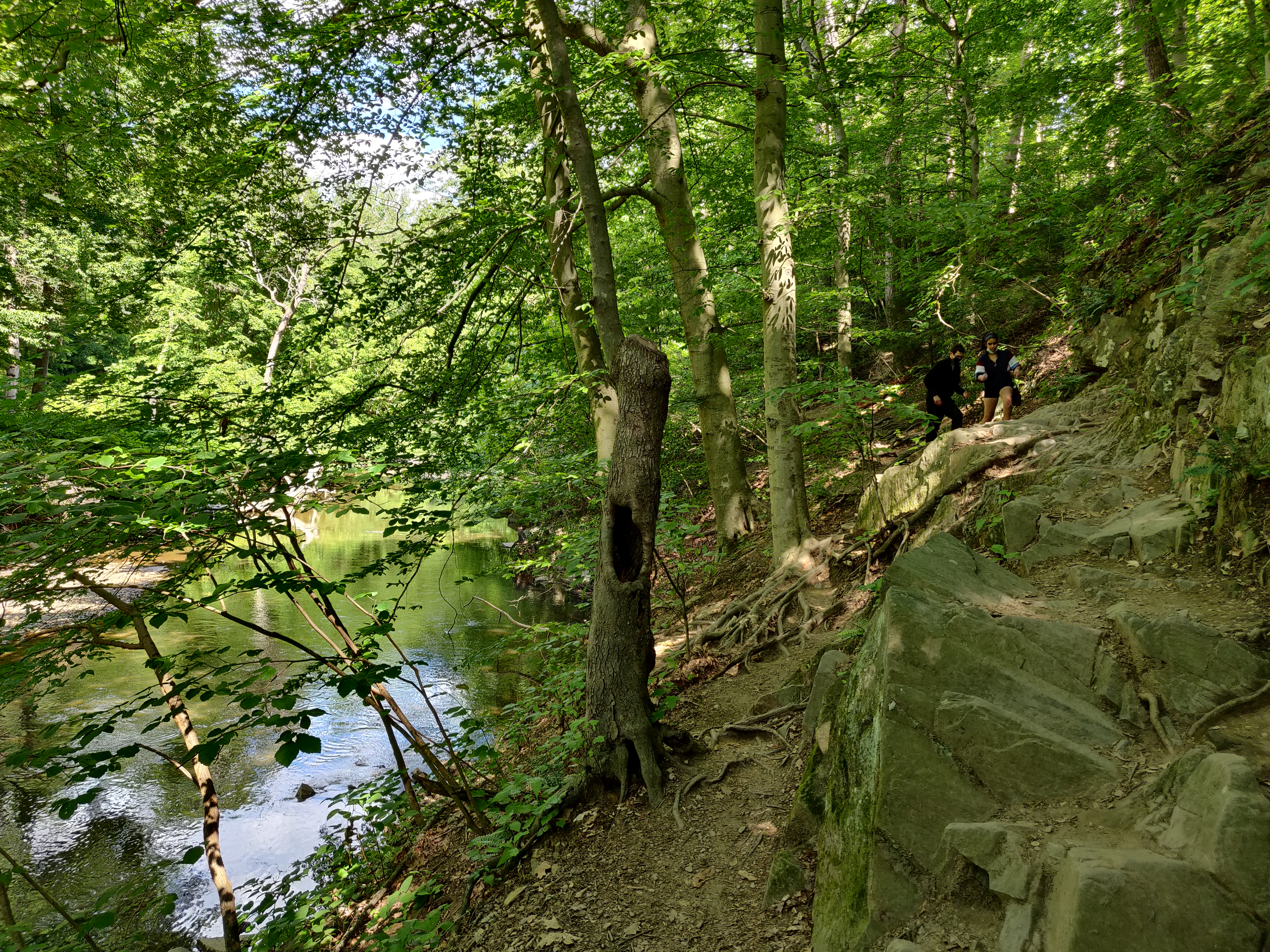
A steep streamside trail

NPS and cyclists have long sought a way to close the gap on the north end of the park. After a 1973 proposal to extend the trail, NPS launched a study and announced a plan to do so in 1983, but quickly retracted it. In 1980, NPS, inspired by road closures in New York's Central Park, prepared an assessment of alternatives for a Bicycle Trail Study of the park that analyzed nine alternatives for completing the trail system, including construction of a new bike trail and alteration of the existing road network. After a period of public comment, NPS proposed expanding the weekend closure; constructing an additional 3.5 mi (5.6 km) of trail, designating Beach Drive north of Bingham a bicycle route and studying the suitability of a trail in that section. After years of additional study, public hearings and trial closures, NPS announced in February 1983 a plan to expand weekend closures and close Beach between Joyce and Broad Branch to automobile traffic. At first only one lane of Beach would be closed during rush hour, but after Metro's Red Line opened in Montgomery County in 1985, the section would be permanently closed. Six months later, under pressure from The American Automobile Association and the governments of D.C. and Montgomery County, the park service decided not to close the section of Beach. Instead, they decided to go ahead with the weekend closures and build a bicycle trail along a horse trail between Joyce and Broad Branch by 1986. But that trail was never built.

In 1982, the Park Service built two new bridges for the trail. One was added across Rock Creek when the road bridge between Pennsylvania Avenue and K Street was rebuilt, enabling the trail to stop using a narrow section of the road bridge. As well, a high-water bridge was built just south of Peirce Mill, replacing the low-water breakaway bridge that had been washed away by Hurricane David in 1979.

By 1990, biking on foot trails or bridle paths was no longer allowed.

In 1991, a high-water bridge replaced the trail bridge beneath Porter Road, the other low-water breakaway bridge built in the 1970s.

The prospect of completing a bike route across the park re-emerged in the 1990s when the park was required to come up with a General Management Plan. In 1991, a loosely knit, cyclist-dominated group called "Auto-Free D.C." renewed the push to ban automobile traffic on Beach Drive. They suggested limited road closures to discourage commuters, but allow access to most locations in the park by car. When NPS failed to take up their suggestion, the group led a series of "rolling road block" protests which aimed to peaceably draw attention to the cause by disrupting rush hour traffic. Nonetheless, the protests led to some confrontations and arrests, and at one point the Military Road Bridge was graffitied with anti-automobile slogans. In 1996, NPS initiated a federally mandated General Management Plan for the park. In June 1997, NPS laid out several management alternatives, one of which would improve and expand the paved multi-use trails and add a new trail along Wise, with the police substation converted to a visitor center and bicycle rental facility. Another alternative suggested that sections of Beach Drive be permanently closed and converted into a wide multi-use trail and that Wise Road, Sherrill Drive, Bingham Drive, Grant Road, and Blagden Avenue be converted to paved trails. Both of these alternatives were less popular than the status quo. An additional alternative created by the People's Alliance for Rock Creek (PARC), a group consisting of the Washington Area Bicyclists Association, the Sierra Club, Friends of the Earth and 18 other advocacy groups, suggested making Beach Drive auto-free north of Broad Branch as a means of completing the trail envisioned in 1965. In 2003, in an attempt to appease both groups, the Park Service proposed extending the weekend closures of Beach Drive to weekdays from 9:30 a.m. to 3:30 p.m. The proposal was one of several, but was the "preferred alternative." The plan had popular support, but no political support. Mayor Anthony Williams who had supported closure as a candidate, opposed it as mayor, citing the need to evacuate in a post-9/11 world. In May 2004, NPS proposed instead to only close the section from Joyce to Broad Branch, but again found opposition among politicians. So, in November 2005, the Park Service finalized their management plan which included no further road closures, the prospect of lowering speed limits and adding speed bumps, and improvements to the trail south of Broad Branch. However, speed limits were never reduced and no traffic calming was ever implemented.

The management plan completion cleared the way for the Park Service and DDOT to rebuild Beach Drive and the trail. Despite planning that started in 2005, work on the project didn't begin until September 22, 2016. The project rebuilt both Beach Drive and the trail. The trail section between Shoreham Drive and Broad Branch was widened to 8–10 ft (2.4–3.0 m), repaved and realigned; the Shoreham Drive crossing, reworked in 2006, was again improved; the traffic lanes in the Zoo Tunnel were narrowed to widen the trail through it by 3 ft (0.91 m); a new access to Harvard Street was built and 1,000 ft (300 m) of new trail was constructed between the Porter Street Bridge and Bluff Bridge. In conjunction with the project, the trail through the Klingle Road intersection was redesigned to connect to the new Klingle Valley Trail, which was built on the washed out section of Klingle Road and opened on June 24, 2017. The work on the trail south of Broad Branch was completed on January 8, 2018. Work on Beach Drive between Joyce and Bingham, which improved a short section of trail near the bridge over the creek was completed on September 27, 2019.

In 2018, DDOT announced plans to rehabilitate and expand the trail within both Rock Creek Park and outside of it. Within Rock Creek Park, they will rehabilitate a section between Klingle Road and Bluff Bridge and a section on the west side of the creek south of Broad Branch Road. They will also build a new trail along Piney Ridge Road from Beach Drive to Arkansas Avenue.

Though the 2005 D.C. bicycle plan only identified a need for "an improved bicycle connection" between Broad Branch and the Maryland Line, the 2013 MoveDC Multi-modal transportation plan includes a future trail on this section.

Sections of park roads have been subject to weekly closures to motor vehicles since the 1960s, though the times and locations changed. After the 1963 closure experiment, another was attempted in 1967 on Beach between Joyce and Broad Branch on Sunday mornings, but the response was not positive and it was discontinued. In 1970, NPS tried again, closing 2 mi (3.2 km) of Beach, and part of Morrow, every Sunday from 9 a.m. to 6 p.m., but was again discontinued due to a lack of use. But, in 1972, NPS tried for a fourth time, again closing Beach between Broad Branch and Joyce from 8 a.m. to 6 p.m. on Sundays and it became a permanent feature. On more than one occasion in the 1970s they experimented with Saturday closures in the summer, once to support a new bicycle concession near Carter Barron, which generated no negative response, but also little use. By 1980, they added the section from Tilden to Piney Branch Road and expanded the hours to 7 a.m. to 7 p.m. and in August 1981, they expanded the closure to Saturdays and holidays as an experiment. In July 1982, the weekend automobile ban was extended to the section of Beach from Picnic Grove 10 to Wise, and between West Beach and the D.C. boundary. In August 1983 they made the closures, between 7 a.m. and 7 p.m. every Saturday and Sunday, official policy as part of the scaled back 1983 Plan. In 1985, the hours were increased from 7 a.m. Saturday to 7 p.m. Sunday from early April to Veterans Day on upper Beach Drive and year-round between Joyce and Broad Branch roads. By 1998 the closures had expanded to include not just the three sections of Beach but also the entirety of Bingham and Sherril Drives within the park and last all year long.

== Administration ==
As originally authorized by Congress, the park was governed by the Rock Creek Park Commission, comprising the Chief of Engineers of the Army, the engineer commissioner of the District of Columbia, and three presidential appointees. In 1933, the park, along with other National Capital Parks, was transferred to the jurisdiction of the National Park Service. The park is patrolled by the United States Park Police.

Rock Creek Park is also an administrative unit of the National Park Service responsible for administration of 99 properties in the District of Columbia north and west of the National Mall and Memorial Parks. The properties include various parks, parkways, buildings, circles, triangles, memorials, and statues and include:

=== Tributary park extensions ===
- Broad Branch
- East Beach Drive
- Klingle Valley Parkway
- Melvin C. Hazen Park – South of Tilden Street on either side of Connecticut Avenue, NW
- Normanstone Parkway – Along Normanstone Drive across Massachusetts Avenue, NW from the US Naval Observatory
- North Portal
- Pinehurst Parkway
- Piney Branch Parkway
- Soapstone Valley Park

=== Other parks ===
- Barnard Hill Park
- Bryce Park – Massachusetts Avenue between Wisconsin Avenue and Garfield Street, NW
- Dumbarton Oaks Park
- Francis Scott Key Memorial
- Georgetown Waterfront Park
- Glover-Archbold Park
- Little Forest – Formerly Francis G. Newlands Park
- Meridian Hill Park
- Montrose Park
- Wesley Heights Park – Along Fulton and Edmunds Streets, NW, connecting Palisades Park to Glover-Archbold Park
- Whitehaven Park – South of W Street, NW connecting Glover-Archbold Park to Dumbarton Oaks Park
- Woodley Park (Playground) – Courtland and Devonshire Places, NW

=== Traffic circles ===
- Chevy Chase Circle
- Grant Circle
- Sherman Circle
- Tenley Circle
- Ward Circle
- Westmoreland Circle

=== Other areas ===
- Battleground National Cemetery
- Fort Circle Parks – from Palisades Park to Fort Lincoln
  - Battery Kemble Park
  - Fort Bayard Park
  - Fort Bunker Hill Park
  - Fort DeRussy
  - Fort Reno Park
  - Fort Slocum Park
  - Fort Stevens Park
  - Fort Totten Park
- Old Stone House

=== Other small areas ===
- Francis Asbury statue
- Guglielmo Marconi memorial
- James Cardinal Gibbons memorial
- Major General George B. McClellan statue
- Rabaut Park
- Peter Muhlenberg Memorial
- Robert Emmet statue

== Geography ==
Although D.C.'s primary geographic metonyms for racial and class divisions are the city's quadrants (i.e., Northwest, Southwest, Northeast, and Southeast), Rock Creek Park also separates prominent neighborhoods such as Georgetown, Cathedral Heights and Spring Valley from the rest of the city; hence, the designations WOTP (West of the Park) and EOTP (East of the Park) also serve this role.

== Legislative history ==
Congressional authorizations:

- Rock Creek Park – September 27, 1890
- Meridian Hill Park – June 25, 1910
- Montrose Park – March 2, 1911
- Rock Creek and Potomac Parkway – March 4, 1913
- Dumbarton Oaks Park – December 2, 1940

== See also ==
- Linden Oak
- Pierce-Klingle Mansion
- List of parks in the Baltimore–Washington metropolitan area
