= EFR =

EFR may refer to:

== Organisations ==
- Eastern Frontier Rifles, a State Armed Police Force for the Indian state of West Bengal
- École Française de Radioélectricité, now EFREI, a French private engineering school
- Ecological fiscal reform
- Economic Faculty Association Rotterdam, at the Erasmus University Rotterdam
- Emergency Federal Register

== Other uses ==
- EF-Tu receptor
- Enhanced full rate, a speech coding standard
