= Reno School =

- U.S. National Register of Historic Places
- D.C. Inventory of Historic Sites
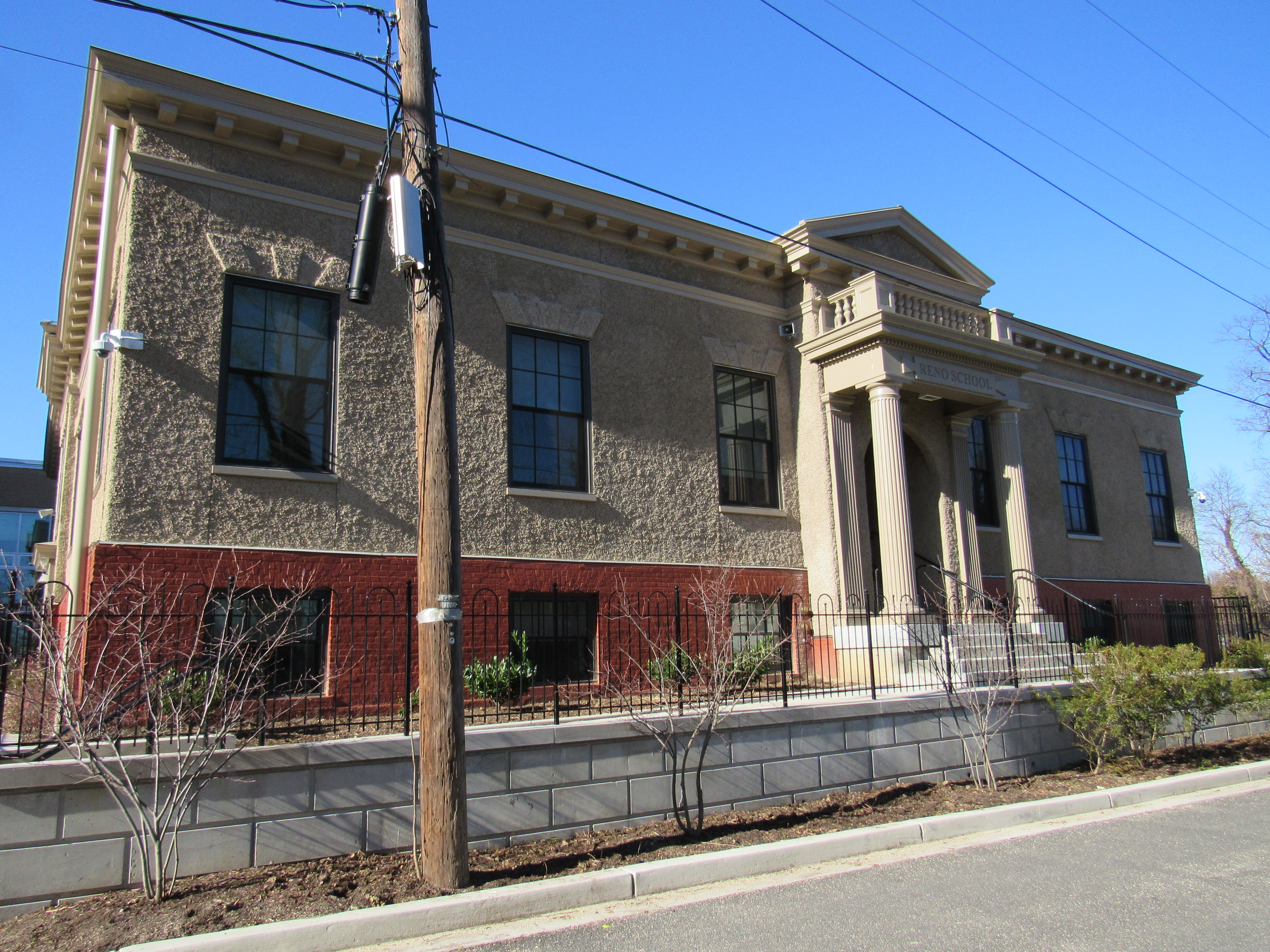
- Reno School in 2016

- Location within District of Columbia
- Location: 4820 Howard Street, NW, Washington, D.C.
- Coordinates: 38°57′9″N 77°4′38″W
- Built: 1903
- Architect: Snowden Ashford
- MPS: Public School Buildings of Washington, DC MPS
- NRHP reference No.: 10000242

Significant dates
- Added to NRHP: September 7, 2010
- Designated DCIHS: November 19, 2009

The Reno School is a historic school building located at 4820 Howard Street NW, completed in 1903 to serve the needs of the Reno community in Washington, D.C. Like all public schools in the District at the time, it was segregated and served African American students in the area west of Rock Creek Park and north of Georgetown. The school was closed in 1950 after the Reno community was evicted to create Fort Reno Park and the adjacent Alice Deal Middle School.

Subsequently, the D.C. government converted the structure into a Civil Defense office and constructed antenna towers on its grounds. The building later was converted back into a school serving special education students, later called the Rose School after Rose Weintraub Alpher. After sitting abandoned for several decades, preservation groups succeeded in granting the structure historic designation in 2009 ahead of a planned renovation. In 2015, the historic building was restored and incorporated into a wing of the Deal School.

While the National Register of Historic Places listing refers to it as the Jesse Reno School contemporary accounts do not reference Civil War General Jesse L. Reno and no formal documentation has been found for this name. Newspapers instead refer to it as the "Reno School" or "Fort Reno School." The neighborhood was named after the fort, which was named after the general.

== History ==
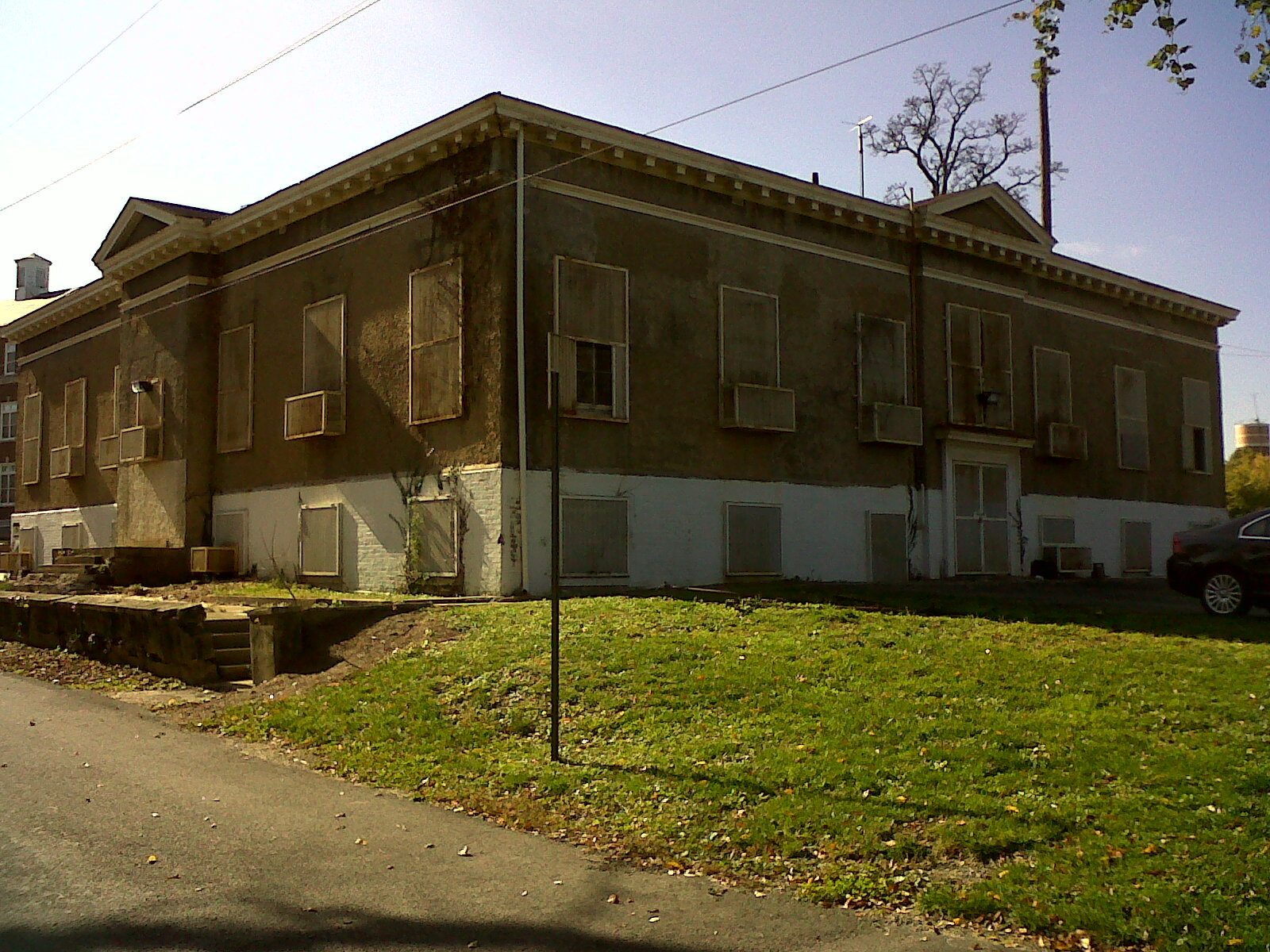
The building prior to its renovation.

Reno was a subdivision of property that included a Civil War fort, in what was at the time the rural unincorporated areas of the District of Columbia. As suburbs around DC grew, an African American community developed from a few families and the Rock Creek Baptist Church into a sizable neighborhood, with many school-aged children. The growing population put pressure on the school African American children attended, the Grant Road School, located roughly on the site of the current Murch Elementary School. Representatives of the community appealed to school board officials for a new building, citing an enrollment of 156 with facilities for only 74.

In 1902, the United States Senate passed an appropriation to purchase the building's site, on the report that 83 of 112 anticipated pupils lived in Reno. It was designed by municipal architect Snowden Ashford in 1902. Construction on the building began in the summer of 1903 and was submitted as complete on October 26, 1903. Grading, utility connection, and other work to complete the school was not completed for several months afterward.

The school became a center of the Reno neighborhood for African Americans. In addition to educating the community's children, it hosting meetings of social groups and its citizens' association. It held eight classrooms originally, later converted into four. The building was fully occupied until 1926, when the first purchases of adjacent land for a white-only junior high school, now Alice Deal Middle School, began. By 1950, the African American population in the area had been reduced to the point that the school had only six pupils. The District of Columbia School board ended instruction at the building that year.

D.C. Public Schools would remain segregated until 1954, when the United States Supreme Court ruled separate but equal doctrine unconstitutional in Bolling v. Sharpe, a companion case to Brown v. Board of Education that dealt specifically with the federal, rather than state, jurisdiction of the District of Columbia.

== See also ==
- National Register of Historic Places listings in Washington, D.C.
