= Fort Reno (Washington, D.C.) =

American Civil War fort in Washington, D.C., U.S.

- Part of Civil War Defenses of Washington
- Washington, D.C.
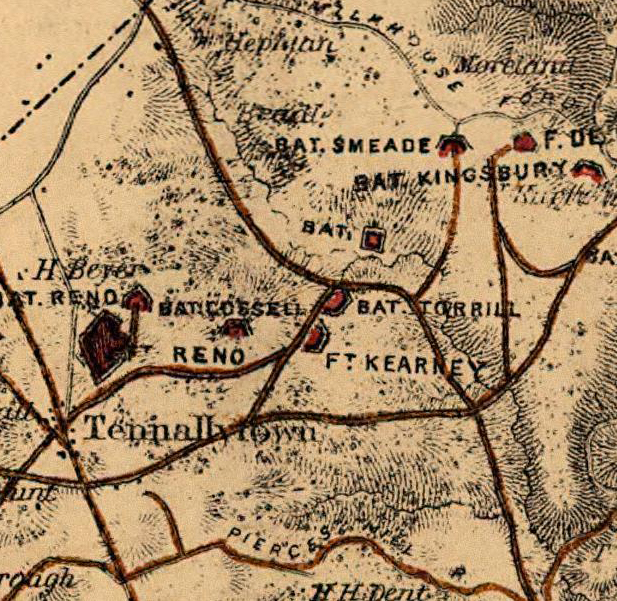
- A closeup of an 1865 map of Washington, D.C.'s defenses, showing the location of Fort Reno and other defenses to the northwest of Tenleytown.

Location
- Coordinates: 38°57′07″N 77°04′33″W

Site history
- Built: 1861
- In use: 1866
- Materials: Earthwork fort and batteries; wood outbuildings.
- Fate: Liquidated
- Battles/wars: Battle of Fort Stevens

Fort Reno was a major fortification of the Civil War Defenses of Washington, located in what is now the Tenleytown neighborhood of Washington, D.C. The fort sat on the highest natural point in the District of Columbia. Fort Reno played a part in the only Civil War battle to take place in the District of Columbia, at the Battle of Fort Stevens.

== Construction ==
In early August 1861, engineers under Major John G. Barnard, in charge of the defenses of Washington, chose the highest point in the District of Columbia for the construction of a fort, with construction starting in earnest in August 1861 with the arrival of McCall's Division of Pennsylvania Reserves. The Utica Morning Herald (NY) of December 16, 1862 gives credit for the building of the fort specifically to the Ninth Regiment Pennsylvania Reserves, however it is known that other regiments of McCall's division were engaged in its construction and that of other forts in the vicinity. At the time the structure was named Fort Pennsylvania and was only renamed Fort Reno in 1863 in honor of Major General Jesse Lee Reno who died at the Battle of South Mountain in 1862. The land on which it was built belonged to the estate of a Treasury Department official named Giles Dyer. Dyer died in 1856, and his wife Jane administered the estate at the time of seizure for the fort. The Dyer farmhouse north of the fort was used by the Army as a headquarters building for various commands encamped in the area. The fortification occupied 20 acres of Dyer land and an additional 50 acres of Dyer's land were used for barracks, camps and a parade ground.

It was one of a string of forts circling Washington to defend it against the Confederates. It had a perimeter of 517 yards, with places for 27 guns, and places for 22 field guns. It had one 100-pound Parrott gun.

Work on the fort was continued by the succession of regiments stationed at the Tennallytown encampment after McCall's division moved to Langley on October 9, 1861. Of these regiments the 119th Pennsylvania Infantry is popularly given credit for having "built the fort" in August and October 1862, however, Fort Pennsylvania had been worked on prior to the 119th Pennsylvania's arrival by the regiments of Peck's Brigade (which were stationed at Tennallytown from October 1861 through to March 1862), the 59th New York and the 9th and 10th Rhode Island Regiments, amongst others. A large signal tower was also constructed at the fort during this period. The location in the heights of North West D.C. was ideal for a signal tower, which likely would have relied on line-of-sight communications. Eventually the fort had a dozen heavy guns and a contingent of 3,000 men, making it the largest fort of those surrounding Washington.

== Engagement ==
The fort saw action on July 10–12, 1864, when Robert E. Lee sent 22,000 Confederates led by General Jubal A. Early against the 9,000 Union troops defending Washington (Ulysses S. Grant had depleted the Union defenses for his siege of Petersburg). The Confederates attacked from the north in Maryland. The initial warnings came from Fort Reno lookouts spying movement by Rockville. The attack itself was directed about 4 miles to the east across Rock Creek at Fort Stevens. The battle is known as "The Battle of Fort Stevens", and resulted in a Union victory.

== Closure and commemoration ==
In 1866, the fort was decommissioned and the land was returned to the Dyer family. The outbuildings and anything that could be sold was liquidated. Subsequently, the Dyer family subdivided the land as a town called Reno, which evolved into a majority Black neighborhood. The earthen fortifications were left in place, with ramparts reportedly visible as late as 1895.

Because of the town's roots in the Civil War and some oral histories, there has been a presumption that the original residents were so-called "contrabands," evidence for this theory is scant. Looking at other forts defending Washington, it is very likely African Americans worked as laborers, servants, or tradesmen supporting the large fort and garrison. In a report to Montgomery C. Meigs, an Army quartermaster did not describe any settlement in a survey of the occupied Dyer estate. The 1870 Census likewise suggests the small community of African American families in Reno arrived later. The town consisted of a handful of families and one church until the 1890s, as African Americans found jobs or themselves sought to live in the growing suburbs.

The earthworks were finally destroyed in the 1890s, to construct a reservoir. Commemoration of the fort became a cause almost within a decade of the fort's closure, but would not be seriously pursued until the early 1900s. It would be a source of conflict the Reno community until the latter's clearance and conversion into Fort Reno Park.
