= The OSYX =

American post-punk band

The OSYX is a Washington DC–based post-punk band that formed in 2018. They have been described as, "largely raucous and at times silvery - with melodic tensions and chemistries, harmonies and howls that make you want to join the pack." in Curve Magazine.

== History ==
The line up currently is Erin Frisby (vocals, guitar, synth, multi-instrumentalist), Ara Casey (vocals, guitar), Selena Benally (vocals, guitar), Robzie Trulove (drums) and Maya Renfro (bass, guitar, vocals). New Noise Magazine calls them "immensely collaborative, with some improvisation going on and anyone being able to bring ideas to the table for any song." The band is named after an alpha female "Yellowstone wolf, The 06 (that’s the pronunciation oh-six), named after her birth year. She was an unusual wolf, large, capable of bringing down a mature elk on her own." The OSYX performed for Fort Reno, Smithsonian Folkways, Washington Mystics and started a non-profit record label called, This Could Go Boom in 2019. In January 2020, The Wammies announced The OSYX as nominee for best Rock Album and Best Rock Group categories, as well as their feature as a performing act for the Wammie weekend.
