= Ground-Mobile Command Center =

Truck convoy usable by the U.S. President as headquarters during nuclear war

The Ground-Mobile Command Center was, or is, a U.S. Army program to develop and deploy hardened and secure, mobile command posts for use by the President of the United States to command retaliation and counterattack by the U.S. armed forces in response to a catastrophic assault against North America.

== Development and purpose ==
The Ground-Mobile Command Center program was initiated in 1981. A predecessor program, the National Mobile Land Command Post (NMLCP), had been considered as far back as the 1960s, but was shelved.

Developed by TRW Inc. under a government contract awarded during the administration of Ronald Reagan, ground-mobile command centers were, or are, an army counterpart to the better-known "Nightwatch", the U.S. Air Force's National Emergency Airborne Command Post, a fleet of hardened aircraft designed to allow the president to remain airborne and mobile during a severe crisis to minimize the possibility of a decapitation strike. Ground-mobile command centers were, or are, 18-wheel tractor-trailers outfitted with defensive systems and sophisticated communications equipment that permits the president or his successor to directly command American nuclear retaliation against another nation while "on the road" in an irradiated and devastated post-attack environment. They were, or are, hardened to protect against electromagnetic pulse attack.

== Operation ==
Colloquially known as "doomsday trucks", ground-mobile command centers were reportedly put into service and positioned in locations around the United States that were considered unlikely to be targeted in an initial nuclear volley launched by a warring state. According to one report these locations were in Colorado and Nebraska. They would be supported by co-located fuel depots and spare parts. As intended, the vehicles would not be the primary transportation mode for the president, but would rather be used only after the air evacuation of the National Command Authority from an area of danger at which point they would "gradually take over full command operations in the post-attack period".

== Similar programs ==
The United States Northern Command (USNORTHCOM) operates a "mobile consolidated control center" (MCCC) for use by the combatant commander (CCDR) as an "alternative HQ" for coordination of emergency and counteroffensive operations following a mainland invasion of the United States. The MCCC consists of a convoy of trucks described as a "survivable, road-mobile backup" from which the CCDR can command U.S. military forces in repelling an attack, should primary and secondary facilities be destroyed or overrun.

== See also ==
- National Emergency Command Post Afloat
- Presidential Emergency Facility
