= Battleground National Cemetery =

Historic veterans cemetery in Washington, D.C.

- U.S. National Register of Historic Places
- D.C. Inventory of Historic Sites
- The cemetery in 2019

- Location within District of Columbia
- Location: 6625 Georgia Ave., NW., Washington, District of Columbia
- Coordinates: 38°58′15″N 77°01′35″W
- Area: 1 acre (0.40 ha)
- Built: 1864
- Website: Battleground National Cemetery
- NRHP reference No.: 66000032

Significant dates
- Added to NRHP: October 15, 1966
- Designated DCIHS: March 3, 1979

Battleground National Cemetery is a military burial ground, located along Georgia Avenue near Fort Stevens, in Washington, D.C.'s Brightwood neighborhood. The cemetery is managed by the National Park Service, together with other components of Rock Creek Park.

== Battle of Fort Stevens ==
The Battle of Fort Stevens, which took place on July 11–12, 1864, marked the defeat of General Jubal Anderson Early's Confederate campaign to launch an offensive action against the national capital. During the battle, 59 soldiers were killed on the Union side. There were approximately 500 casualties on the Confederate side of the battle.

== Burials ==
After the battle, Quartermaster General Montgomery C. Meigs seized 1 acre (0.40 ha) of farm land to use for burying the dead. Under direction from President Abraham Lincoln and Meigs, forty were buried on the evening of July 12 on the battlefield site. The dead were later moved to the current location of Battleground National Cemetery. A possibly apocryphal story states that Lincoln came to the site to dedicate it as the Battleground National Cemetery.

It was declared that anyone who fought in the battle was permitted to be buried at the location, but only one more veteran of the battle, Edward R. Campbell, was buried in the cemetery in March 1936 at the age of 92. Four of the family members (the mother and three children) of the cemetery's first caretaker are also buried at the cemetery. All of them died within five years of each other. The cemetery is now a closed site and no more burials are permitted.

In addition to the grave markers, the cemetery includes four monuments to units that fought at Fort Stevens, including the 25th New York Volunteer Cavalry, 98th Pennsylvania Infantry, 122nd New York Infantry, and the 150th Ohio National Guard.

== Administration ==
The historic superintendent's lodge

The piece of land was previously part of a fruit orchard owned by farmer James Malloy. When he returned to his land after the dust cleared from the battle, Malloy was upset that his land was taken and challenged the action. Through an act of Congress passed on February 22, 1867, the land was acquired and officially transferred to the government on July 23, 1868 with payment made to Malloy.

A superintendent's lodge was built in 1871, using a basic stone design by General Montgomery Meigs that was a prototype for all national cemeteries. The lodge was built as a residence for the superintendent of the cemetery. The superintendent's lodge was added to the National Register of Historic Places on April 4, 1980.

Battleground National Cemetery was administered by the United States Department of War until 1933–34, when it was transferred to the National Park Service. The cemetery was administratively listed on the National Register on October 15, 1966, and is one of the smallest national cemeteries.

In 2005, the DC Preservation League listed the cemetery as one of the most endangered historic sites in Washington, D.C. The National Park Service has been allocated funds under the American Recovery and Reinvestment Act of 2009 for restoration work at Battleground National Cemetery.

== See also ==
- National Register of Historic Places listings in the District of Columbia
