= Reno (Washington, D.C.) =

Former mixed-race neighborhood in Washington, D.C., U.S.

- Former Neighborhood of Washington, D.C.
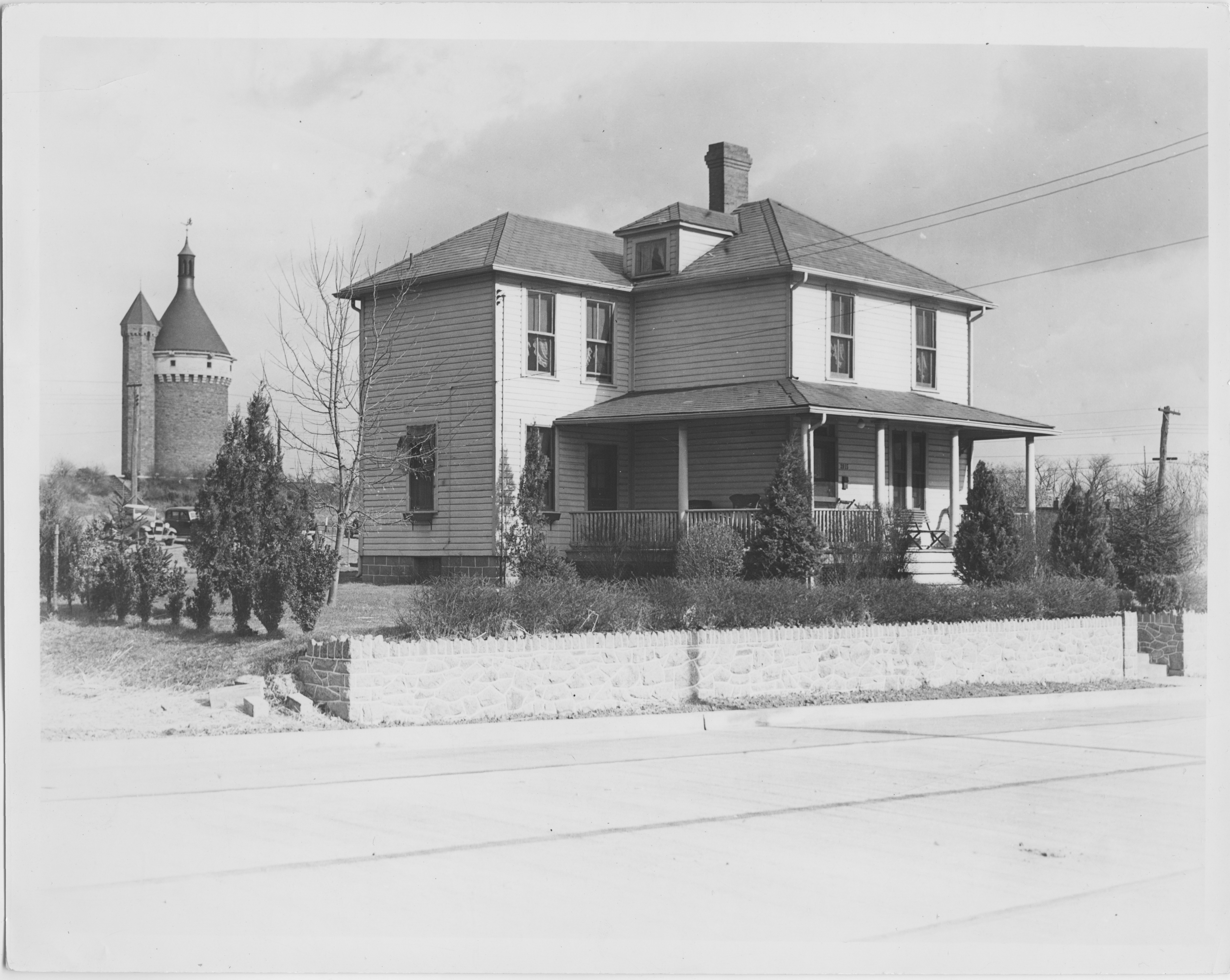
- Photograph of Reno taken during its clearance.
- Interactive map of Reno
- Coordinates: 38°57′07″N 77°04′33″W
- Country: United States
- District: Washington, D.C.
- Ward: Ward 3
- Subdivision: 1869
- Cleared: c.1956

Reno was a town and then neighborhood in Washington, D.C. that existed from the 1860s into the mid-twentieth century on the ground that is now Fort Reno Park in the Tenleytown neighborhood. The town's residents were largely African American, which eventually led to its clearance for Fort Reno Park and Alice Deal Middle School. Its original developers referred to it as Reno City, however this name faded from use before the 1920s.

== History ==
The land lies on a promontory and was mostly part of the "Fletchall's Chance" land patent. In 1853, a Treasury Department official named Giles Dyer purchased the land to establish a 62-acre estate, where he held several slaves. Upon Dyer's death in 1856, the property was left to his wife, Jane, who managed the farm until the United States government during the Civil War. Union Army engineers constructed a fortress to surveil Wisconsin Avenue. Originally named Fort Pennsylvania, it was renamed after Union general Jesse L. Reno after his death during the Battle of South Mountain.

In 1867, two years after the Civil war had ended, the Dyer family attempted to subdivide and sell the property, but were unable to because Giles Dyer's will was invalid. As a result, the family settled by hiring real estate brokers called Newell Onion and Alexander Butts to subdivide the property as small, affordable homesites.. The pair divided the land into over 1,000 residential lots "of 2,500 square feet each, and one half of these...at the low figure of $12.50" as advertised in the July 27, 1869 issue of the Evening Star. They called this new subdivision “Reno City.”

Although it is possible that freedpeople, either laborers employed to build forts or “contrabands”, had settled around Fort Reno prior to the end of the war, evidence of such is minimal. In a report for Jane Dyer regarding the occupation property, E. E. Camp of the Quartermaster's Department described the layout to Montgomery C. Meigs noted, “Twenty acres by Fortifications, the remaining Fifty acres by barracks, Camps and as parade grounds…” but makes no mention of any home made by and for Black laborers. Rather it appears that Renos's Black population began settling in around the area after the Civil War. For example, the 1870 census counts a Black family with a surname Jones lived in Tenleytown in Reno. With a three-year-old child born in Maryland, it is clear that Madison and Catherine Jones and their family had not lived in Reno for very long.

Later census data shows a rise in Reno's Black population over the course of a couple of decades. In a local police census conducted in 1897, the data collected noted a 74 percent increase of Black people living in the area from the data reported five years earlier.

By the year 1872, Reno was home to a Black church: Rock Creek Baptist Church, located on the corner of what is now Nebraska Avenue and Chesapeake Street. According to a 1970s oral history with a displaced Reno resident, Mary Daniel, the church often sponsored events such as picnics, pageants, Sunday School trips to the National Zoo. Reno's second Black church, St. Mark's Methodist Episcopal Church, was founded in 1888, Reno's final local church, St. George's Episcopal Church was founded as a mission of St. Albans Parish in 1913.

At the request of Reno's African American residents, the District of Columbia Commissioners constructed the segregated Reno School in 1903.

=== Clearance ===
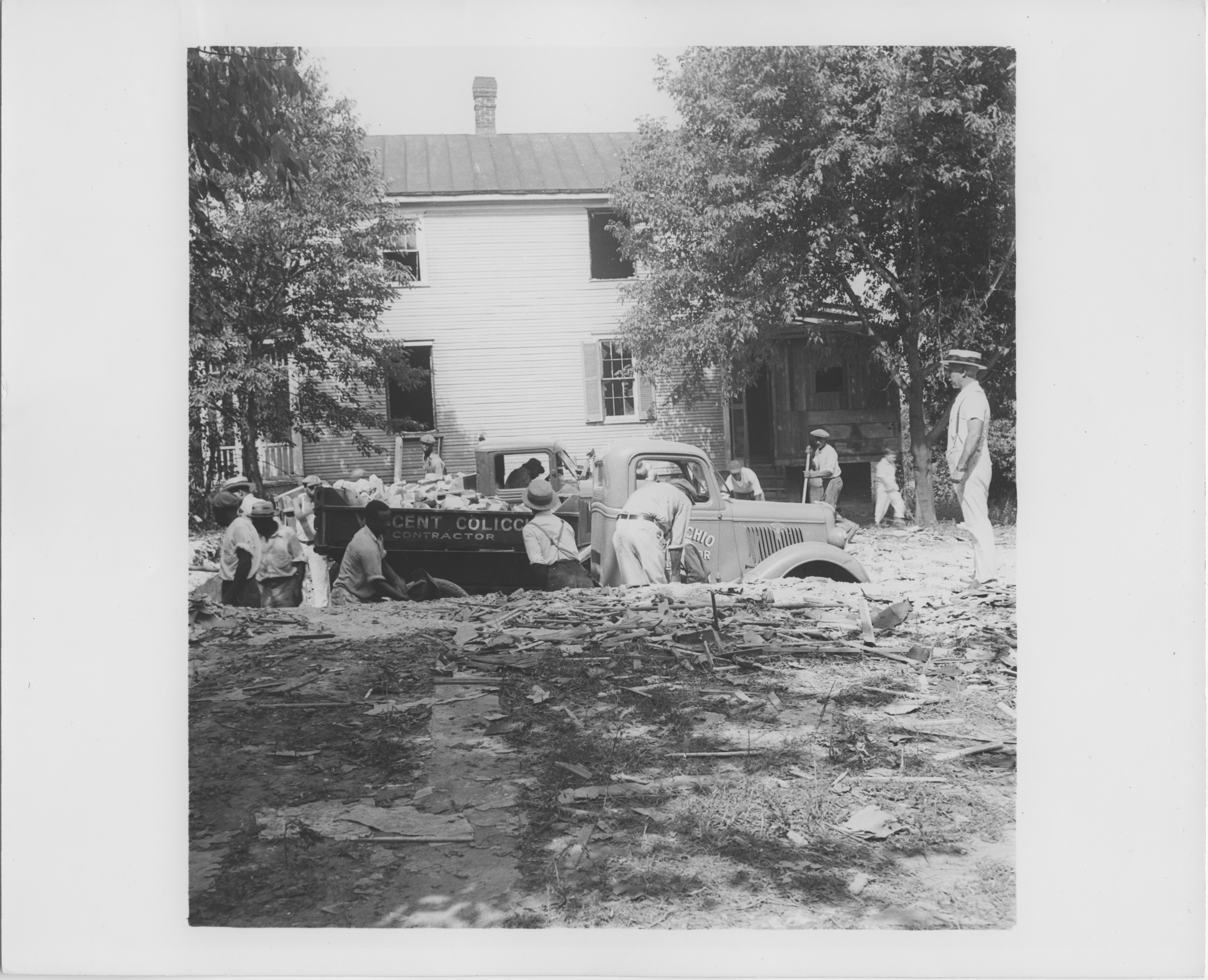
Demolition of 3900 Emory Place by Works Progress Administration workers in 1936.

However, as early as 1901, the presence of this African-American neighborhood in what were becoming elite segregated suburbs presented a problem for white developers. They began efforts to removing the community and redeveloping the land. During the 1920s, developer the Chevy Chase Land Company and the Chevy Chase Citizens’ Association lobbied the federal government to purchase or condemn Reno for the development of schools and a park for Chevy Chase residents’ use. In November 1925, the National Capital Park Commission voted to clear the Reno neighborhood for schools and park and asked the United States Congress, which directly administered the District of Columbia between 1873 and 1975, to pay for it separately. Within weeks, bills to eradicate Reno were introduced in both houses and endorsed by the appointed city managers, the Board of Commissioners of the District of Columbia. In march of 1926, three Black men, James Neill, Thomas Walker, and Thomas Johnson hurried to the Capitol, and were given the opportunity to plead for Reno's non-removal in public hearings. Transcripts of the hearings show these men and several residents including Thornton Lewis, the multiple-time elected vice president of the Reno Citizens' Association (RCA) argued fervently to save their homes from destruction and themselves from removal.

Despite the clear opposition, desire had not faltered amongst Reno's surrounding white neighbors and city officials to continue efforts to remove and redevelop Reno. In 1929, the National Capital Park and Planning Commission (NCPPC) began to buy houses in Reno, threatening the use of eminent domain to owners that refused to sell. Evidence that the clearance of Reno was racially motivated is robust. In a NCPPC meeting in February 1928, after a vote in general support of Reno's redevelopment, NCPPC member Ulysses S. Grant III stated, “There have been many schemes to get the colored settlements out of there, and this is merely one way of doing it.” Similarly, a white employee at the waterworks in Reno related to a research assistant of E. Franklin Frazier that Reno was being cleared as part of a deliberate segregationist plot. Through the 1930 and into the late 1940s, NCPPC continued to make offers and buy Reno property.

== Legacy ==
Reno's citizens left as they were bought out or evicted. Their houses were demolished and the ground was redeveloped. Today, Alice Deal Middle School and Fort Reno Park occupy the same land that where Reno's houses stood. The Reno School survived and was restored in 2014 and is now a wing of the Deal school. A prominent physical relic of Reno is a fire hydrant that stands solitarily on Fort Reno Park.

Many of the individuals who were involved in clearing Reno were major figures in urban planning at the time, and others would go on to be influential. Melvin Hazen went on to serve as District Commissioner for nearly a decade. The membership of the National Capital Park and Planning Commission that voted multiple times to clear Reno included Frederic Delano, architect Milton Medary, developer J. C. Nichols, and landscape architect Frederick Law Olmsted Jr. In addition to Ulysses S. Grant III, commission staff who worked on the project included director of the National Resource Planning Board Charles Eliot II, director of the National Park Service Conrad L. Wirth, and John Nolen Jr. Grant and Nolen continued to work at NCPPC, developing and overseeing plans for Southwest DC's urban renewal in the 1950s and the development the mostly unbuilt highway system for DC.

== See also ==
Fort Reno Park

Chevy Chase (Washington, D.C.)
