= Federal Relocation Arc =

Protection facilities near Washington, DC

The Federal Relocation Arc is a network of facilities surrounding Washington, D.C. designed to ensure the survival of non-military components of the United States government in the event the capital city of Washington is rendered uninhabitable during a war or other serious emergency, such as a nuclear attack. Departments participating in the Federal Relocation Arc are primarily agencies that might not themselves be military targets but could have their operations disrupted should a serious event occur in the capital.

== Organization ==
Development of the Federal Relocation Arc began during the presidency of Dwight Eisenhower after military leaders came to the conclusion that planning for the post-attack survival of the President of the United States alone would be a useless exercise if the rest of the government were wiped out.

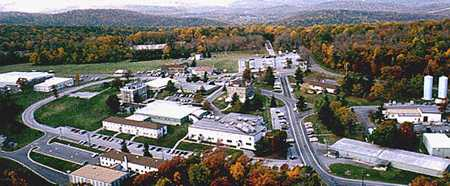
The High Point Special Facility (pictured) is the second of three layers in the Federal Relocation Arc.

The Federal Relocation Arc consists of three layered networks of facilities, each of which is designed to be progressively more survivable and fortified than the previous. In the event that intelligence or rising tensions indicate that a serious emergency may soon develop, cabinet-level agencies of the United States government would activate three "emergency teams" sequentially lettered "A", "B", and "C". Each pre-designated emergency team generally consists of 60 to 100 staff who are capable of running the most critical functions of the government agency that they represent. Following an alert, an agency's "A" team would move to a secure underground facility located within or immediately adjacent to the agency's normal headquarters building in Washington, D.C. The "B" team would relocate to the High Point Special Facility in Virginia's Blue Ridge Mountains. The "C" team would set up office at a dedicated emergency facility that each agency maintains approximately 20–30 miles outside of Washington.

After the onset of the event, the "A" team would continue to operate the agency in question until it was destroyed or its ability to communicate with the outside world was cut off, at which time the "B" team would seamlessly assume control. Following the destruction or loss of communication with the "B" team, authority for the operation of the agency would transition to the "C" team. Should the "C" team no longer be able to function, administrative control of the agency could diffuse to regional offices.

Mobilization and dispersal of emergency teams to the Federal Relocation Arc may require several hours to complete, so its utility would be susceptible to a "Bolt Out of the Blue" attack (known by the military acronym "BOOB"), a sudden, decapitating nuclear strike against Washington, D.C. by a foreign state that occurred with no warning and was not preceded by any period of rising tension or intelligence indicators. Military planners consider the likelihood of such an attack to be low.

== Activations ==
An alert issued following the September 11, 2001 attacks initiated the dispersal of departmental emergency teams to relocation sites. According to unconfirmed media reports, teams continued to operate from relocation facilities until November of that year.

== Sites ==
Front Royal, Virginia is the location of previously used "C" team sites for both the U.S. Department of Agriculture and U.S. Department of State.

== See also ==
- Emergency Federal Register
- Presidential Emergency Facility
