= Economic Faculty Association Rotterdam =

Economic Faculty association Rotterdam
- Industry: Student services
- Founded: 1925
- Headquarters: Rotterdam, Netherlands
- Website: efr.nl

Established in 1925, the Economic Faculty association Rotterdam (EFR) has over 7000 members making it one of the biggest, oldest, and most active faculty associations in Europe. It belongs to the Erasmus School of Economics, a faculty of the Erasmus University Rotterdam.

EFR sets objectives for the students by filling the gap between theory and practice. They do this by organising a large number of activities. One of their most popular activities is the EFR Inspiration Days, one of the most prestigious and professional student conferences in Western Europe.

== History ==
EFR was established on 14 March 1925, when the Association for Student Interests (VVS) was founded to represent the students of the Netherlands School of Commerce.

In the forty years that followed, the VVS has served students by being the bridge between students and professors, representing student interests and organizing guest lectures, with notable speakers like professor Joseph Schumpeter in 1925/1926. From September 1939, the Netherlands School of Commerce was renamed to the Netherlands School of Economics and the VVS continued to serve its students. On 11 November 1964 the members of the general member meeting decided to rename the association to the "Economic Faculty association Rotterdam".

As from 1969, a new concept was introduced called colleges. The disputen had been intended especially for the progressed students who kept themselves busy with their main subjects. Later some of these colleges split off from the main association forming their own associations, these include; Faector (econometrics), JFR (law), Aeclipse (policy economics master students) and a few more. In the academic year 1977/1978, EFR-Bulletin was published for the first time; a communication booklet was distributed after the lectures. In the following year EFR-Courant was introduced. Later the booklet took the form of the magazine Eclaire. The magazine was published five times a year and 6000 issues were distributed among students and business associates. Some special editions, for the Business Week for example, were sent out to all economics students in the Netherlands. The last edition of the Eclair was published in 2014, in 2019 a special lustrum edition was created but this was never formally published.

The governing board of the academic year 1980/1981, a congress took place with the subject of "America", which became known as the so-called showpiece of EFR. Later, the board of 1984/1985 named the same event the "EFR-Business Week", starting a very long tradition. Every year The business week would take place, hosting a variety of well known speakers and big companies. In the spring of 2019 the last edition of the EFR Business Week took place, and was subsequently followed in the winter by the first edition of the EFR Master Career Week, and the EFR Inspiration Days in 2020. The Master Career Week was set up to replace the recruitment part of the Business Week, while the Inspiration Days was meant replace the inspirational and orientational part of the Business Week.

In 1996 the first EFR World Leader Cycle award was awarded to Michail Gorbachev in 1996 for 'his efforts to reform policies within the party and his actions which helped end the Cold War.'. Ever since it has been the case that every few years prominent leaders that stood out because of their actions in the field of politics or society are being considered for the award. The World Leader Cycle award is presented by EFR on behalf of both students and the faculty. Among past winners are many influential politicians and other world leaders such as John Nash Jr., Ban Ki-moon, and François Hollande.

== Erasmus Recruitment ==
Together with Faculty Association STAR, EFR co-owns Erasmus Recruitment the largest campus recruitment platform in Europe. Erasmus Recruitment is a concept of its own, with both a recruitment platform, as well as the biggest on-campus Recruitment event of Europe, the Erasmus Recruitment Days. In 2016 there were approximately 2800 participating students and more than 115 companies present.

== Master Career Week ==
The EFR Master Career Week, first took place in 2019, succeeding the immensely popular Business Week. The event consists of ‘branch bootcamps’ during which students will vitis four companies of a specified branch over the course of two days, getting an exclusive look into these companies’ way of conducting business. During these visits, students get the chance to experience these companies’ cultures and connect with their people on a personal level. The bootcamps are usually a blend of formal and informal activities containing both Workshops as well as dinners and fun activities.

== Other projects ==
One of the international activities of EFR is the Involve consultancy project. This is a project where 20 students work together with an NGO abroad to investigate and improve a problem facing society.

Together with EenVandaag EFR organises the EFR EenVandaag election debate. This collaboration came about in the run-up to the 2002 elections and resulted in the first debate on 21 March 2002. The debate was held in the auditorium of Erasmus University Rotterdam. Thanks to the participation of Pim Fortuyn, this debate has probably been the most striking of the series.
