= Fort Stevens (Washington, D.C.) =

Historic fort in Washington, D.C.

- Washington, D.C.
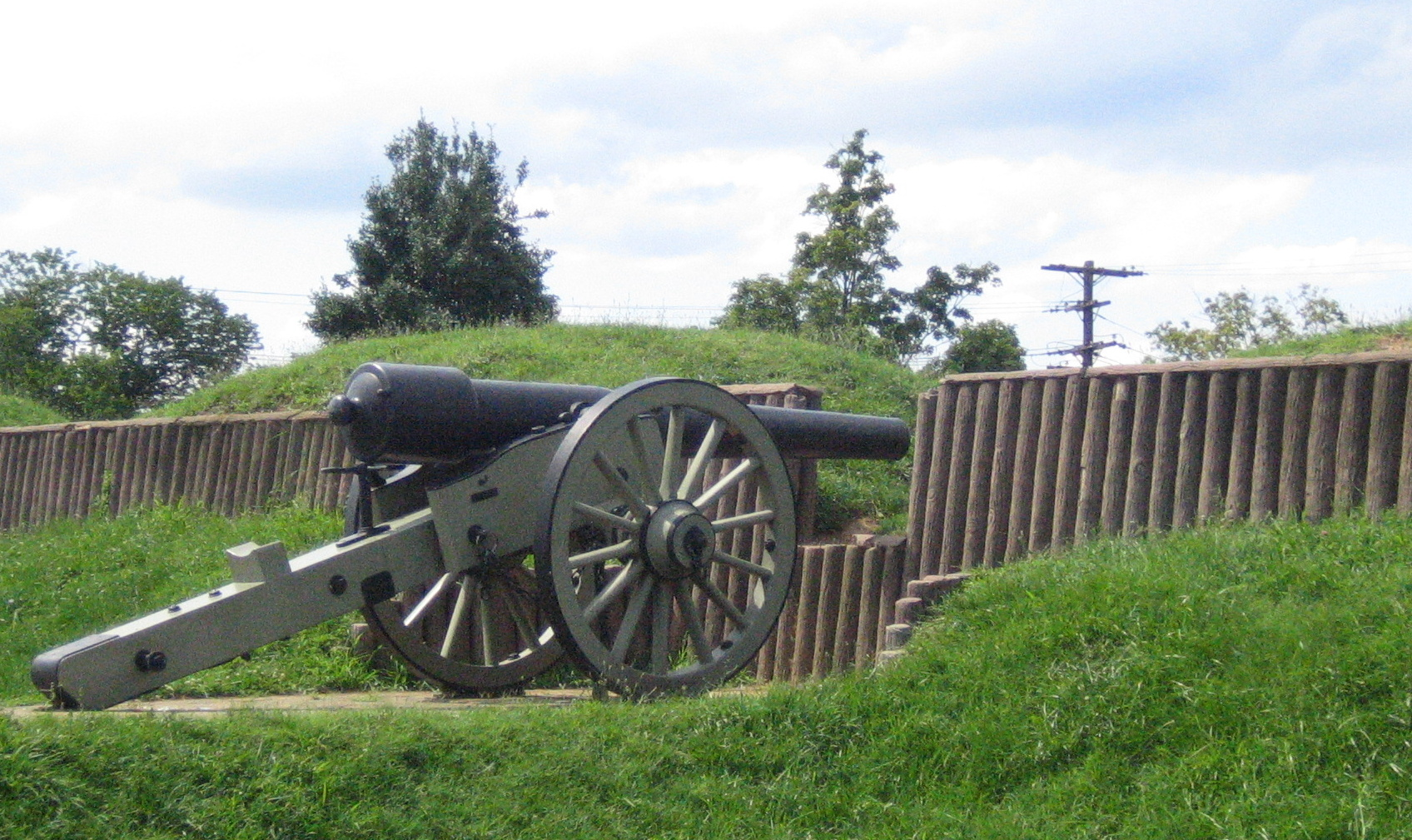
- A Civil War-era cannon at Fort Stevens in July 2006

Site information
- Owner: National Park Service

Location
- Location of Fort Stevens in Washington, D.C.
- Location within District of Columbia
- Coordinates: 38.96417°N 77.02889°W

Site history
- Built: 1861
- Materials: Earthwork

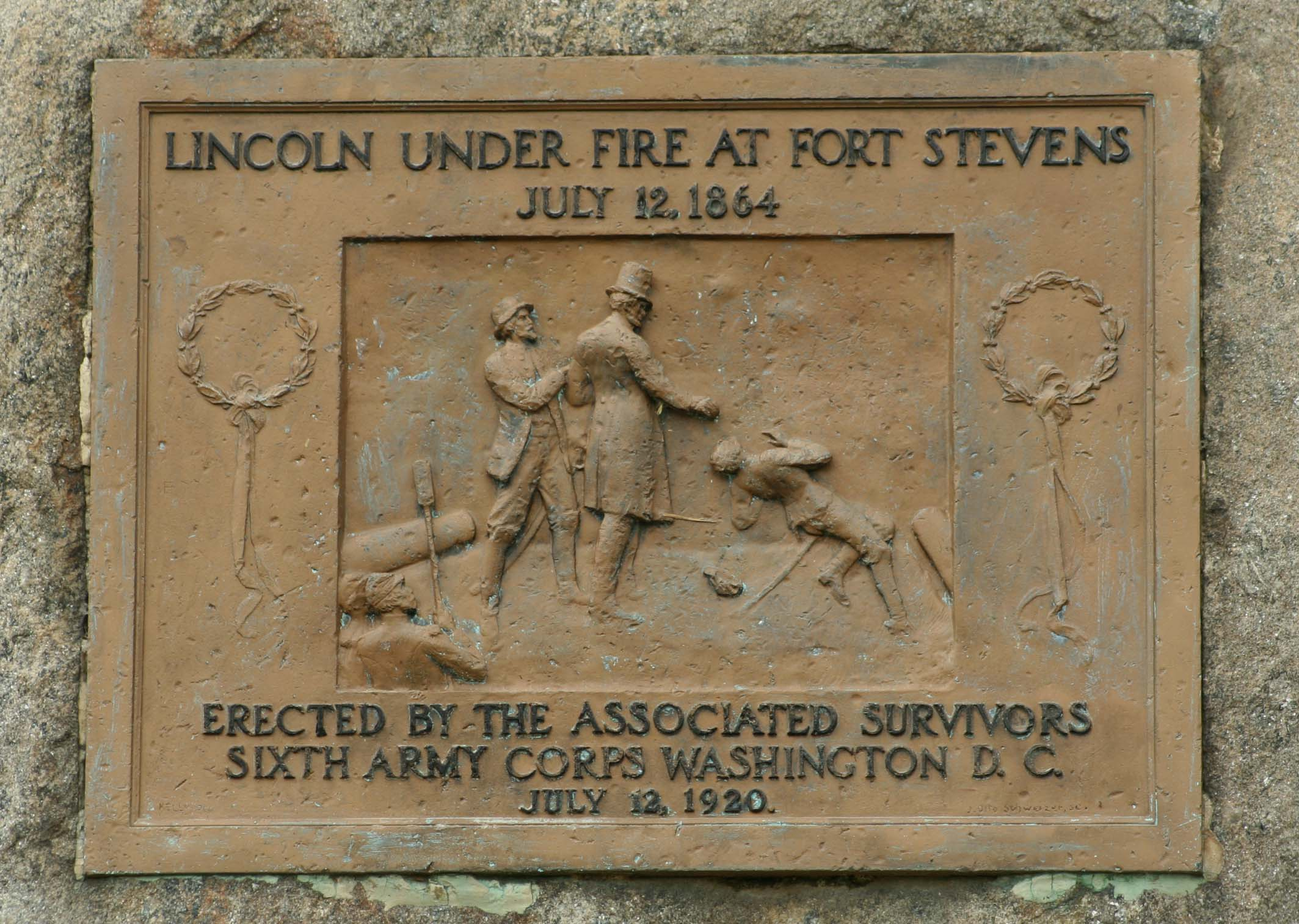
Marker memorializing Abraham Lincoln's visit to the fort

Fort Stevens, formerly named Fort Massachusetts, was part of the extensive fortifications built around Washington, D.C., during the American Civil War.

== Location ==
The fort was constructed in 1861 as "Fort Massachusetts" and later enlarged by the Union Army and renamed "Fort Stevens" after Brig. Gen. Isaac Ingalls Stevens, who was killed at the Battle of Chantilly, Virginia, on September 1, 1862. In 1861, it had a perimeter of 168 yards and places for 10 cannon. In 1862, it was expanded to 375 yards and 19 guns.

It guarded the northern approach to Washington City, the Seventh Street Turnpike. By 1864 Fort Stevens was one part of a 37-mile-long (60 km) arrangement of fortifications, consisting of 68 forts intended to defend the capital.

== Construction ==
The fort was constructed as a part of a defensive ring around Washington City. Following the Union Army's defeat at Bull Run, Congress voted to augment the city's defenses, which consisted of a single fort, Fort Washington, 12 miles (19 km) to the south on the Potomac River. Eventually, "68 forts, 93 batteries, 20 miles of rifle pits, and 32 miles of military roads surrounded the capital and Washington became the most heavily fortified city in the world", according to the National Park Service.

In September 1861, Union troops took possession of a property owned by a free black family, Elizabeth Proctor Thomas and her siblings, at the Seventh Street Turnpike, seeing it as "an ideal and necessary location for a fort." The soldiers ultimately destroyed her home, barn, orchard, and garden to build what was then named Fort Massachusetts.

Elizabeth Thomas would later often repeat the story that she was, with a baby in her arms weeping, watching Union soldiers destroy her house when "a tall, slender man dressed in black approached her and said, 'It is hard, but you shall reap a great reward.'" Many listening to her story held that the man was President Abraham Lincoln.

Thomas would have to fight for compensation for damage and loss of her property and was eventually awarded $1,835 in 1916 (equivalent to $54,292 in 2025), a year before her death.

== Civil War ==
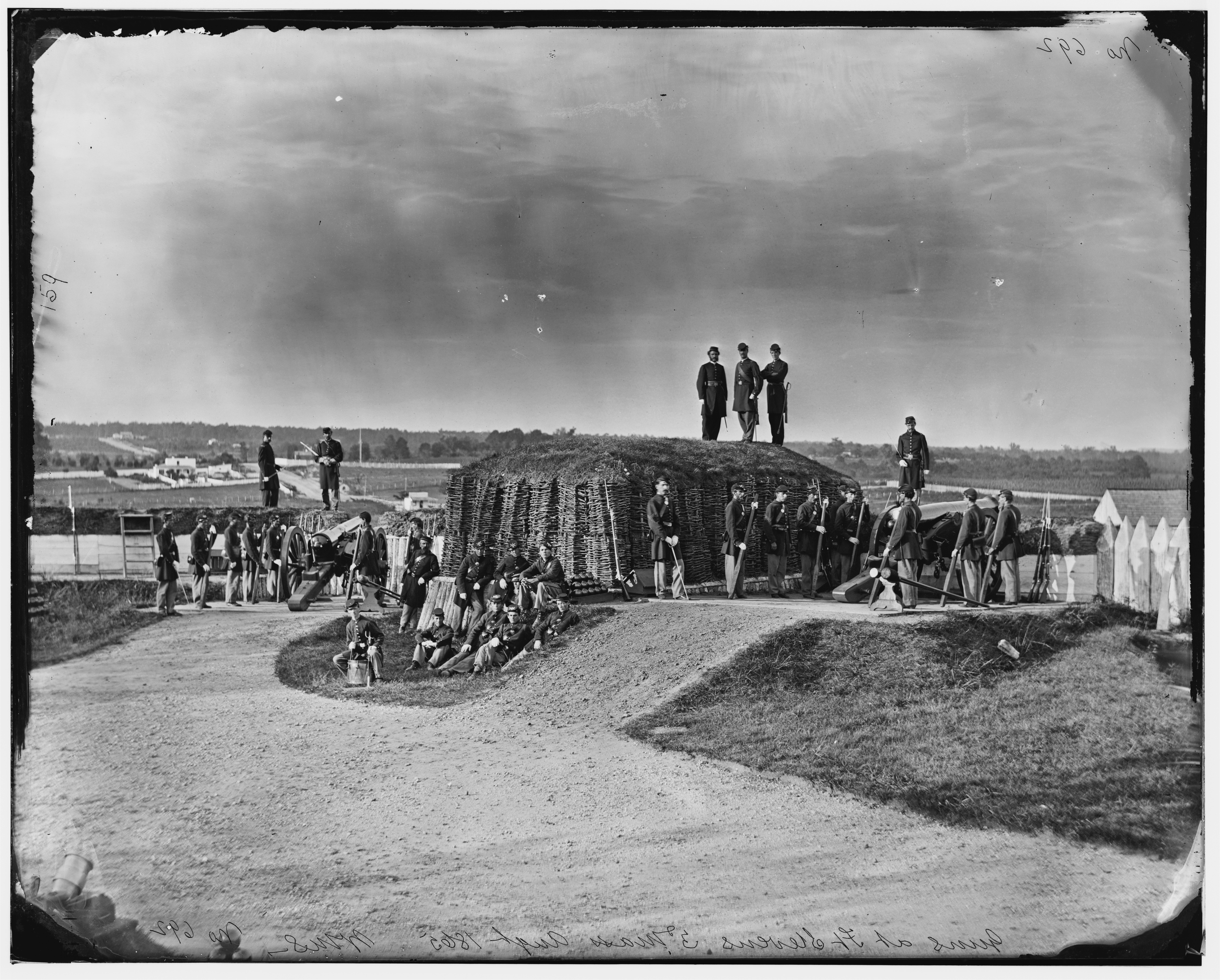
District of Columbia. Detachment of Company K, 3rd Massachusetts Heavy Artillery, by guns of Fort Stevens

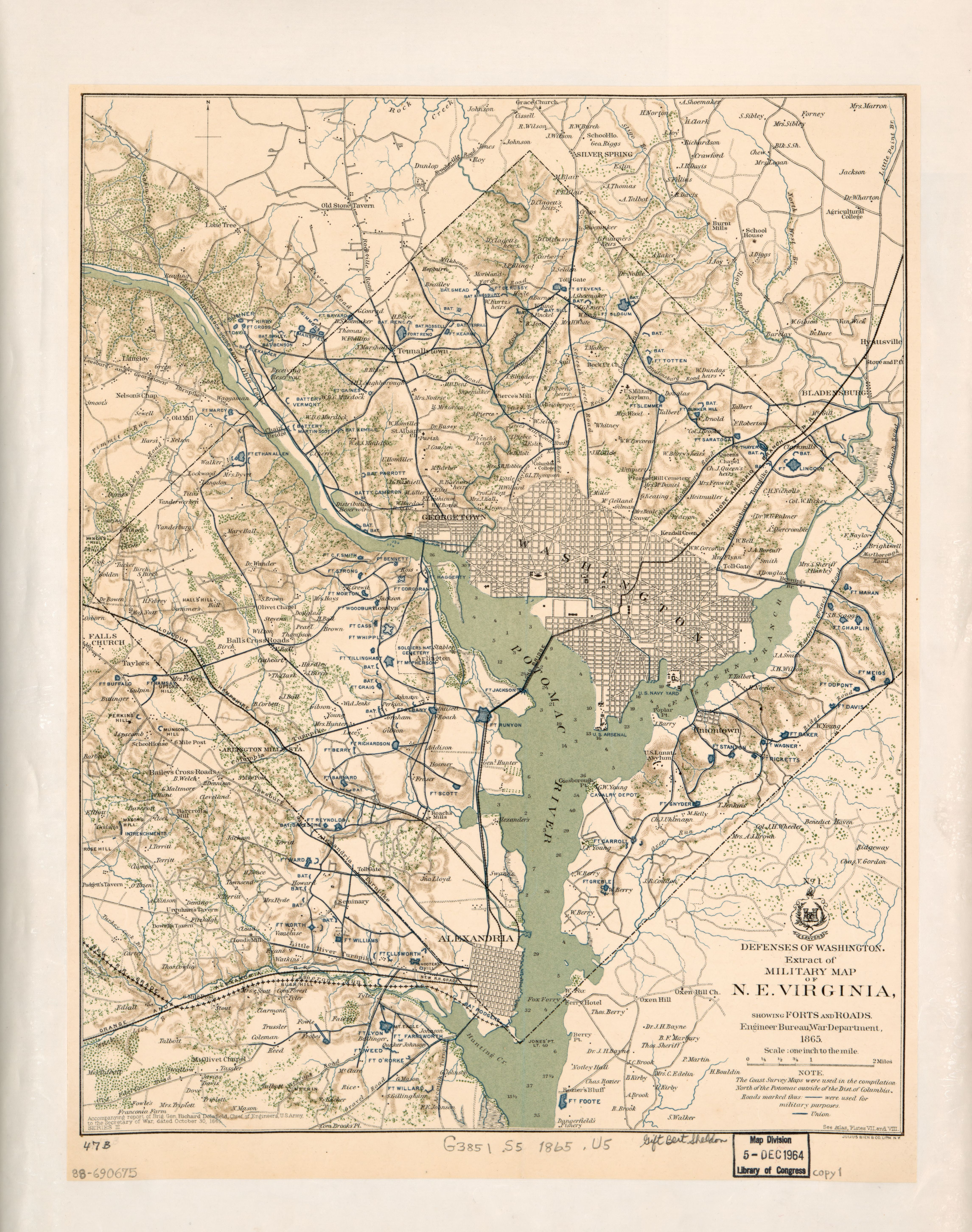
Historical map of Washington DC area, showing forts and roads in N.E. Virginia, Drafted by U.S. War Department, 1865

After being delayed by the Battle of Monocacy, Maj. Gen. Jubal Early's Confederate forces advanced on Washington, D.C. The cavalry attacked Fort Stevens in the Battle of Fort Stevens on July 11 and July 12, 1864. They were delayed stealing horses in Damascus, Maryland, and staying overnight near Rockville. In response, Major General George Thomas ordered the District of Columbia Militia into the service of the Union army.

On July 11, Confederate sharpshooters successfully shot two of the fort's soldiers, but Union soldiers pushed the Confederate soldiers back to a point 300 yards (270 m) from the fort. The Confederate Army used the house of a nearby resident, Francis Preston Blair, as a headquarters and a makeshift hospital for their wounded. The livestock of several nearby farmers was captured by the Confederate Army. By the evening of July 11, pedestrians lined nearby Seventh Street to watch the fighting. Secretary of State William Seward watched from a carriage.

The Union Army destroyed five nearby houses in order to prevent them being occupied by Confederate sharpshooters; the Union Army allowed the homeowners to remove their furniture before destroying the houses. Despite this, Confederate sharpshooters occupied another home, of Mr. Lay, just west of the fort, and fired shots at Union soldiers from there. Union soldiers responded by firing at the cupola of the house, which caused the Confederate sharpshooters to retreat from it. The house was later burned to the ground. Confederate sharpshooters also fired from Morrison's orchard nearby.

Overnight July 12, the Confederate soldiers retreated from the fort. Confederate soldiers were seen crossing the Potomac River from Poolesville, Maryland, to Virginia. They left behind 101 wounded soldiers, including 11 officers. The total number of Confederate casualties was unknown; the number of Union soldiers killed, wounded, and missing was approximately 50.

According to many accounts, President Abraham Lincoln rode out to the fort on both days to observe the attack, and was briefly under enemy fire by sharpshooters. On July 12, he was brusquely ordered to take cover, mostly likely by Union Maj. Gen. Horatio Wright. A story has grown up, probably apocryphal, that future Supreme Court Justice Oliver Wendell Holmes Jr., then an aide-de-camp to Wright, yelled at Lincoln, "Get down, you fool!" In 1922, Holmes recalled seeing Lincoln at Fort Stevens, but did not mention shouting to him. Another story attributes this quote to nearby resident Elizabeth Thomas. This is believed to have been only the second time in American history that a sitting president came under enemy fire during a war (the first being President James Madison during the War of 1812). An article published by The Evening Star on July 13 noted, however, that "President Lincoln and Mrs. Lincoln passed along the line of the city defences in a carriage last night, and were warmly greeted by the soldiers wherever they made their appearance amongst them." The article makes no mention of Lincoln coming under fire.

== Present day ==
The site was abandoned after the war. By 1900, Lewis Cass White, who had fought with the 102nd Pennsylvania Infantry in the Battle of Fort Stevens, led the formation of the Fort Stevens Lincoln Memorial Association. The association raised funds for a stone memorial on the site, which was dedicated on November 7, 1911. In the late 1930s the Civilian Conservation Corps restored a portion of the parapet and one magazine.

The site, near Georgia Avenue at 13th Street and Quackenbos Street NW, is now maintained by the National Park Service Civil War Defenses of Washington. The remains of 41 Union soldiers who died in the Battle of Fort Stevens are buried on the grounds of nearby Battleground National Cemetery.

Further up Georgia Ave, a monument to seventeen unknown Confederate Soldiers was erected in Grace Episcopal Church Cemetery, in Silver Spring, MD. The seventeen soldiers, who died at Fort Stevens, are buried in that cemetery.

== See also ==
- Civil War Defenses of Washington
- Washington, D.C., in the American Civil War
- Bibliography of the American Civil War
- Bibliography of Abraham Lincoln
- Bibliography of Ulysses S. Grant
