= Emergency Federal Register =

Planned replacement for the United States Federal Register

The Emergency Federal Register (EFR) is the planned replacement for the Federal Register, the official journal of the United States government, in the event publication of the Federal Register is suspended by presidential decree following the onset of a severe national calamity, such as a major nuclear attack or a mainland invasion of the United States. According to the Office of the Federal Register, the Emergency Federal Register "can only be activated under extreme national security conditions".

Publication in the Federal Register of newly enacted federal regulations is required prior to their effective date. The purpose of the Emergency Federal Register would be to permit the continuation of such required publication but from a location outside of Washington, DC, in the event that city were overrun or rendered uninhabitable, or by methods or means other than bound paper, possibly including broadcast transmission or a town crier system. The Office of the Federal Register maintains alternate work sites where the Emergency Federal Register can be managed, including one site in Laurel, Maryland, another site in Rocket Center, West Virginia, and at least one other "classified location".

Authority for activation of an alternative to the Federal Register is contained in Title 44, Section 1505 of the United States Code, which specifies that:

In the event of an attack or threatened attack upon the continental United States and a determination by the President that as a result of an attack or threatened attack publication of the Federal Register or filing of documents with the Office of the Federal Register is impracticable, or under existing conditions publication in the Federal Register would not serve to give appropriate notice to the public of the contents of documents, the President may, without regard to any other provision of law, suspend all or part of the requirements of law or regulation for filing with the Office or publication in the Federal Register of documents or classes of documents.

Many new regulations required in a crisis situation, however, would not require advance publication. A contingency regulatory code, operating in parallel to the Code of Federal Regulations and known as the Emergency Code of Federal Regulations, can be immediately promulgated following the onset of an emergency.

== See also ==
- Federal Relocation Arc
