= Horatio Wright =

United States Army general (1820–1899)

Horatio G. Wright
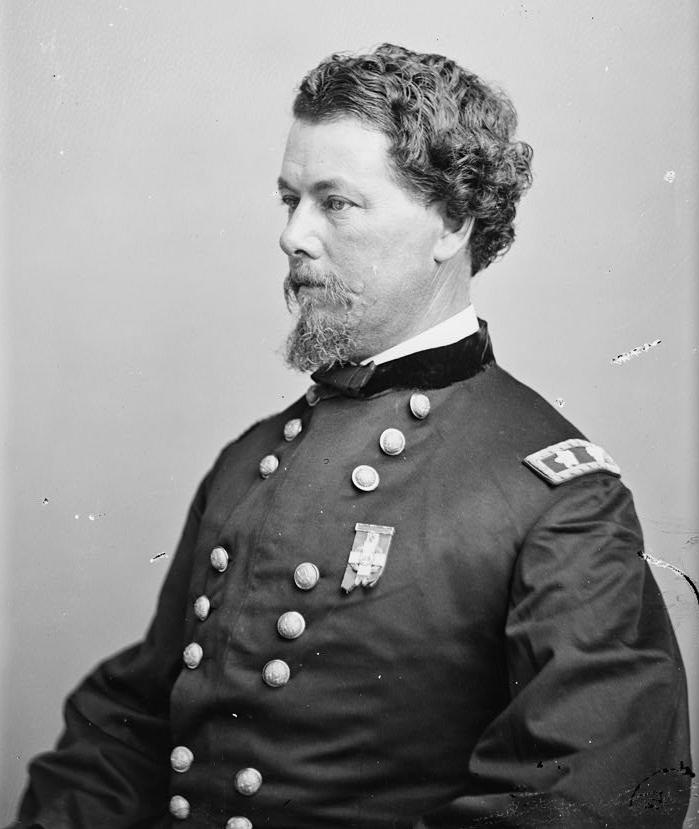
- Born: March 6, 1820; Clinton, Connecticut, US
- Died: July 2, 1899 (aged 79); Washington, D.C., US
- Burial place: Arlington National Cemetery
- Military career
- Allegiance: United States of America; Union
- Branch: United States Army; Union Army
- Service years: 1841–1884
- Rank: Major General
- Commands: Department of the Ohio; Army of the Ohio; VI Corps; U.S. Army Corps of Engineers
- Conflicts: American Civil War; First Battle of Bull Run; Battle of Gettysburg; Mine Run Campaign; Overland Campaign; Valley Campaigns of 1864; Siege of Petersburg; Appomattox Campaign

Horatio Gouverneur Wright (March 6, 1820 – July 2, 1899) was an engineer and general in the Union Army during the American Civil War. He took command of the VI Corps in May 1864 following the death of General John Sedgwick. In this capacity, he was responsible for building the fortifications around Washington DC, and in the Overland Campaign he commanded the first troops to break through the Confederate defenses at Petersburg. After the war, he was involved in a number of engineering projects, including the Brooklyn Bridge and the completion of the Washington Monument, and served as chief of engineers for the U.S. Army Corps of Engineers.

== Early life ==
Wright was born in Clinton, Connecticut, son of Edward and Nancy Wright. When he was 14 he entered Alden Partridge's military academy in Vermont (now Norwich University). In 1837 he entered West Point and graduated second in his class of 52 from the United States Military Academy in 1841 with a commission in the engineers. He taught engineering and French at West Point over the next several years. He was sent to Florida in 1846, where he spent ten years working on the harbor of St. Augustine and the defenses of Key West, including Fort Jefferson. In 1855, he was promoted to the rank of captain and served as assistant to Chief of Engineers Colonel Joseph G. Totten the following year. During this time, he was appointed as a member of a military committee to study iron carriages for the construction of naval guns and ordnance specifications of the 15-inch gun. He later co-wrote Report on Fabrication of Iron for Defenses (published in 1871–1872) based on his time on the board.

== Civil War service ==
After the start of the war, Wright took part in the evacuation and destruction of the Gosport Navy Yard (later named the Norfolk Navy Yard) on April 20, 1861, to prevent its exploitation by Confederate forces. He was captured during this action, but was released four days later as Virginia had not yet joined the Confederacy and therefore wasn't at war with the United States.

Wright began constructing fortifications around Washington, D.C., before being assigned to the 3rd Division of the Department of Northeast Virginia under Maj. Gen. Samuel P. Heintzelman. Serving as chief engineer of the 3rd Division during the First Battle of Bull Run on July 21, 1861, Wright was promoted to major in August. Promoted to brigadier general of volunteers the following month, Wright was assigned as chief engineer to Maj. Gen. Thomas W. Sherman's November 1861 expedition against Port Royal, South Carolina. His successes while commanding Union troops in operations against Jacksonville, St. Augustine, and other military targets on the Florida coast from February to June 1862 led to his appointment as major general of volunteers and commander of the Department of the Ohio in August 1862, and commander of the newly created Army of the Ohio in March 1863. In this command he played a major logistical role in the repulse of Confederate General Braxton Bragg's invasion of Kentucky in 1862. His appointment as major general was not confirmed by the Senate and was revoked in March 1863. As a brigadier general, he was not considered eligible to command a department and Maj. Gen. Ambrose Burnside was sent to relieve him. Reporting to Burnside, Wright remained briefly as the commander of the District of Western Kentucky before returning to the East.

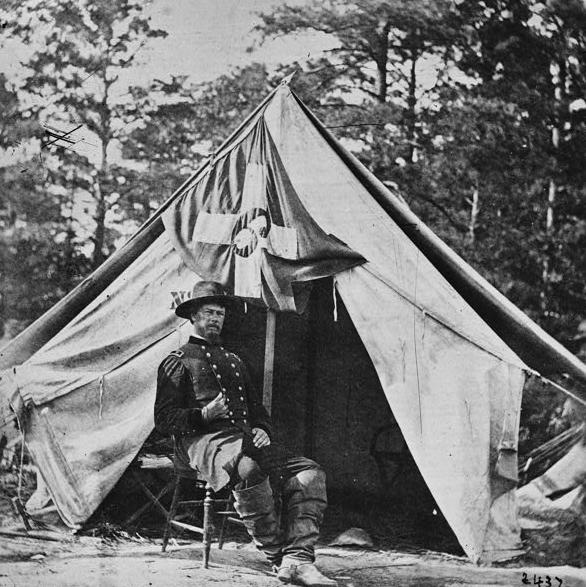
General Wright in front of his tent

In May 1863, Wright was given command of the 1st Division in the VI Corps of the Army of the Potomac under Maj. Gen. John Sedgwick. His first battle in division command was Gettysburg in July 1863, where his corps was held in reserve. The corps saw action at Mine Run in November 1863, and the Battle of the Wilderness on May 5 to May 6, 1864. After General Sedgwick's death at Spotsylvania Court House on May 9, Wright assumed command of the VI Corps, receiving promotion as major general of volunteers (confirmed by the Senate this time) and brevet colonel in the regular army on May 12, 1864.

Wright's corps fought at Cold Harbor from June 3 to June 12, 1864. In the Valley Campaigns of 1864, he was dispatched to Washington, D.C., to defend against Confederate Lt. Gen. Jubal Early's raid on July 11 and July 12, 1864, commanding the Washington Emergency Defense Force, consisting of the VI, VIII, and XIX Corps. During the defense of Fort Stevens, he gained notoriety by inviting President Abraham Lincoln to join him on a parapet exposed to enemy fire. (A young staff officer, Oliver Wendell Holmes, is often said to be responsible for yelling at the president to get under cover. In George Thomas Stevens's post-war (1870) history of the VI Corps, Wright related to Thomas that he himself was the person who shouted at the president to get down.

Wright commanded the VI Corps again during Maj. Gen. Philip H. Sheridan's Shenandoah Valley campaign from August 6 to October 16, 1864. Wright directed fighting at Cedar Creek on October 19 before General Sheridan's arrival.

In the Siege of Petersburg, the VI Corps was the first unit to break through the Confederate defenses, on April 2, 1865. Subsequently, operating under the command of Sheridan, it defeated Confederate forces at Sayler's Creek on April 6, 1865, resulting in the capture of a large number of Confederate soldiers, including Lt. Gen. Richard S. Ewell and Major General G. W. Custis Lee, son of Robert E. Lee. For Wright's actions at Petersburg he was promoted to a brevet major general in the regular army.

== Postbellum ==
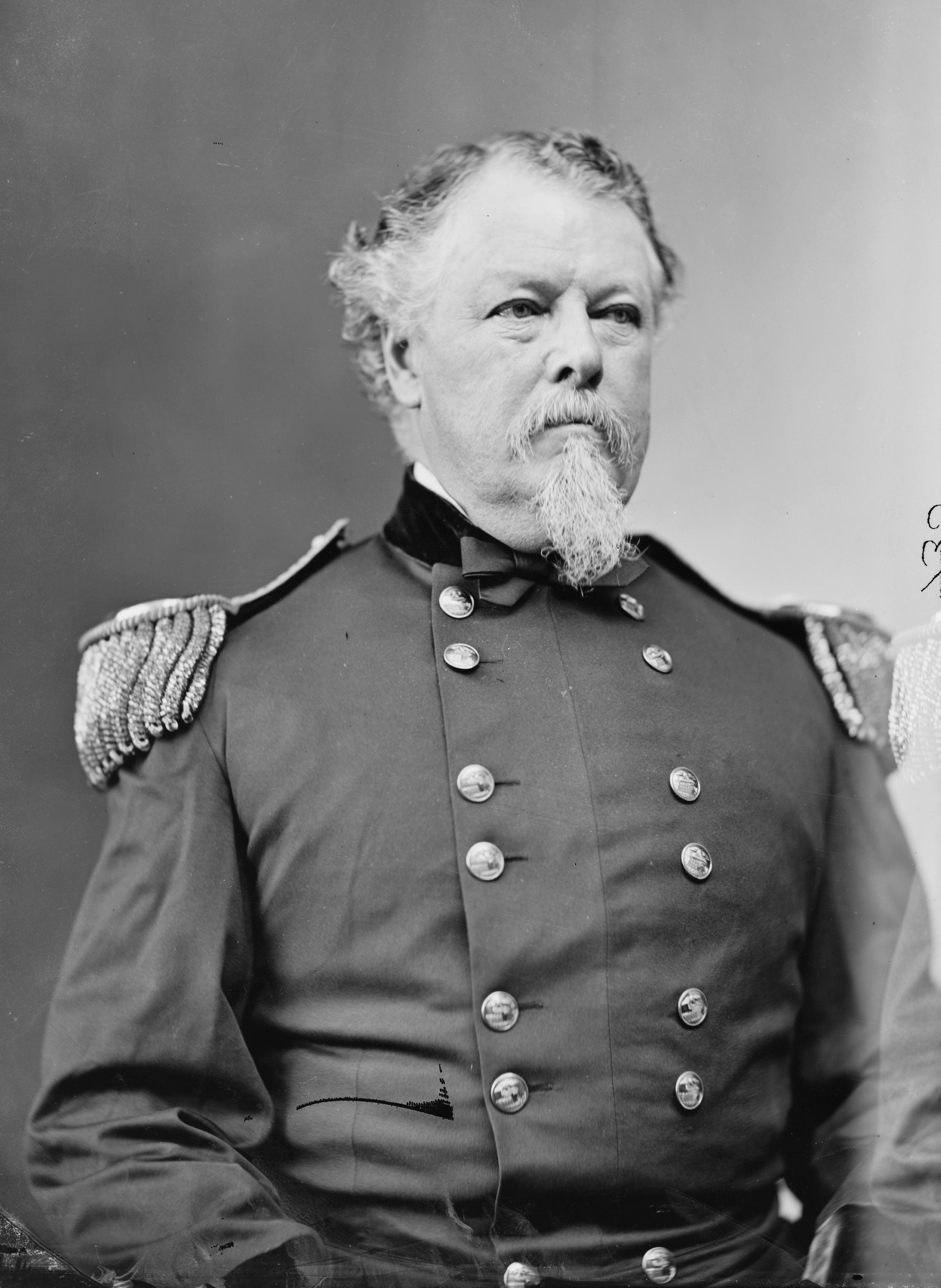
Portrait by Mathew Brady or Levin C. Handy, c. 1873

During Reconstruction, Wright commanded the Army of Texas from July 1865 to August 1866. He was promoted to lieutenant colonel of engineers in November, before leaving volunteer service in September 1866. He was involved in a number of engineering projects including the Brooklyn Bridge and the completion of the Washington Monument. Promoted to colonel in March 1879, Wright was later named chief of engineers as a brigadier general in June 1879. He retired at that rank on March 6, 1884, and lived in Washington, D.C., until his death in 1899. He was buried at Arlington National Cemetery, in Arlington, Virginia under an obelisk erected by veterans of the VI Corps, facing the Washington Monument he completed.

The city of Fort Wright, Kentucky, is named for an earthwork structure (named for Wright) that was planned during the Confederate invasion of Kentucky in the summer of 1862 while Wright was in command of the Department of the Ohio. Designed to be a five-sided fortification, it was never completed. The earthwork was destroyed in the 1880s by road construction.

Fort H. G. Wright on the western tip of Fishers Island, New York, is also named in his honor.

== See also ==
- List of American Civil War generals (Union)

== Notes ==
Military offices
Preceded by Andrew A. Humphreys	Chief of Engineers; 1879–1884	Succeeded by John Newton
