= Battle of Fort Stevens =

1864 battle of the American Civil War

Coordinates: 38.9641°N 77.0288°W

- Part of the American Civil War
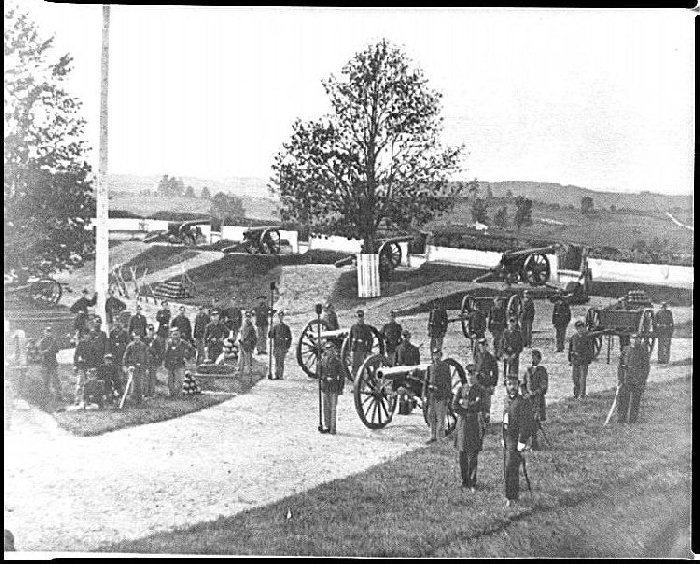
- Officers and men of the 3rd Massachusetts Heavy Artillery Regiment at Fort Stevens
Date	July 11–12, 1864
Location	Washington County, District of Columbia
Result	Union victory

Belligerents
United States (Union)	(Confederate States of America) Confederate States

Commanders and leaders
Alexander M. McCook; Horatio G. Wright; Abraham Lincoln (observer)	Jubal Early

Strength
9,600	10,000

Casualties and losses
373	400–500

The Battle of Fort Stevens was an American Civil War battle fought July 11–12, 1864, in Washington County, D.C. in present-day Northwest Washington, D.C., during the Valley campaigns of 1864 between forces under Confederate Lieutenant General Jubal Early and Union Major General Alexander McDowell McCook.

Early's attack, less than 4 miles (6.4 km) from the White House, caused consternation in the U.S. government, but reinforcements under Maj. Gen. Horatio G. Wright and the strong defenses of Fort Stevens minimized the threat. Early withdrew after two days of skirmishing after attempting no serious assaults. Then U.S. President Abraham Lincoln personally observed the battle's fighting.

== Background ==
In June 1864, Lt. Gen. Jubal Early was dispatched by Gen. Robert E. Lee with the Second Corps of the Army of Northern Virginia from the Confederate lines around the Confederate capital of Richmond, Virginia, with orders to clear the Shenandoah Valley of Federals and, if practical, to invade Maryland; disrupt the Baltimore and Ohio Railroad; and, if possible, threaten Washington, D.C. The hope was that a movement into Maryland would force Union Lt. Gen. Ulysses S. Grant to send troops to defend Washington against the threat and reduce his strength to take the Confederate capital of Richmond.

After driving off the Army of West Virginia under Maj. Gen. David Hunter after the Battle of Lynchburg on June 18, the Second Corps marched northward through the valley, entering Maryland on July 5 near Sharpsburg. They then turned east towards Frederick, where they arrived on July 7. Two days later, as the Second Corps prepared to march on Washington, Maj. Gen. Lew Wallace, leading a small Union force composed mostly of garrison troops, bolstered by the eleventh-hour addition of two brigades of the VI Corps sent from Richmond under Maj. Gen. James B. Ricketts, attempted to resist the Confederate advance at the Battle of Monocacy.

The July 9 battle lasted from about 6 a.m. to around 4 p.m. Early's corps ultimately drove off the Union troops, the only substantial force between it and the capital. Still, the battle cost Early precious time that would have been better spent in advancing the 40 miles (64 km) toward Washington City. After the battle, Early resumed his march on the District of Columbia and arrived at its northeast border near Silver Spring around noon on July 11. Because of the battle and then the long march through the stifling summer heat, and unsure of the strength of the Union position in front of him, Early decided not to send his army against the fortifications around Washington until the next day.

Early's invasion of Maryland had the desired effect on Grant, who dispatched the rest of the VI Corps and XIX Corps under Maj. Gen. Horatio G. Wright to Washington on July 9. As Lee wrote to James Seddon, the Confederate Secretary of War, on July 19:

It was believed that the Valley could then be effectually freed from the presence of the enemy and it was hoped that by threatening Washington and Baltimore, Gen. Grant would be compelled to weaken himself so much for their protection as to afford an opportunity to attack him, or that he might be induced to attack us.

The steamships carrying the Union force started to arrive in Southeast Washington around noon on July 11, about the same time that Early reached the outskirts of Fort Stevens with the lead elements of his troops.

=== Defense of Washington ===
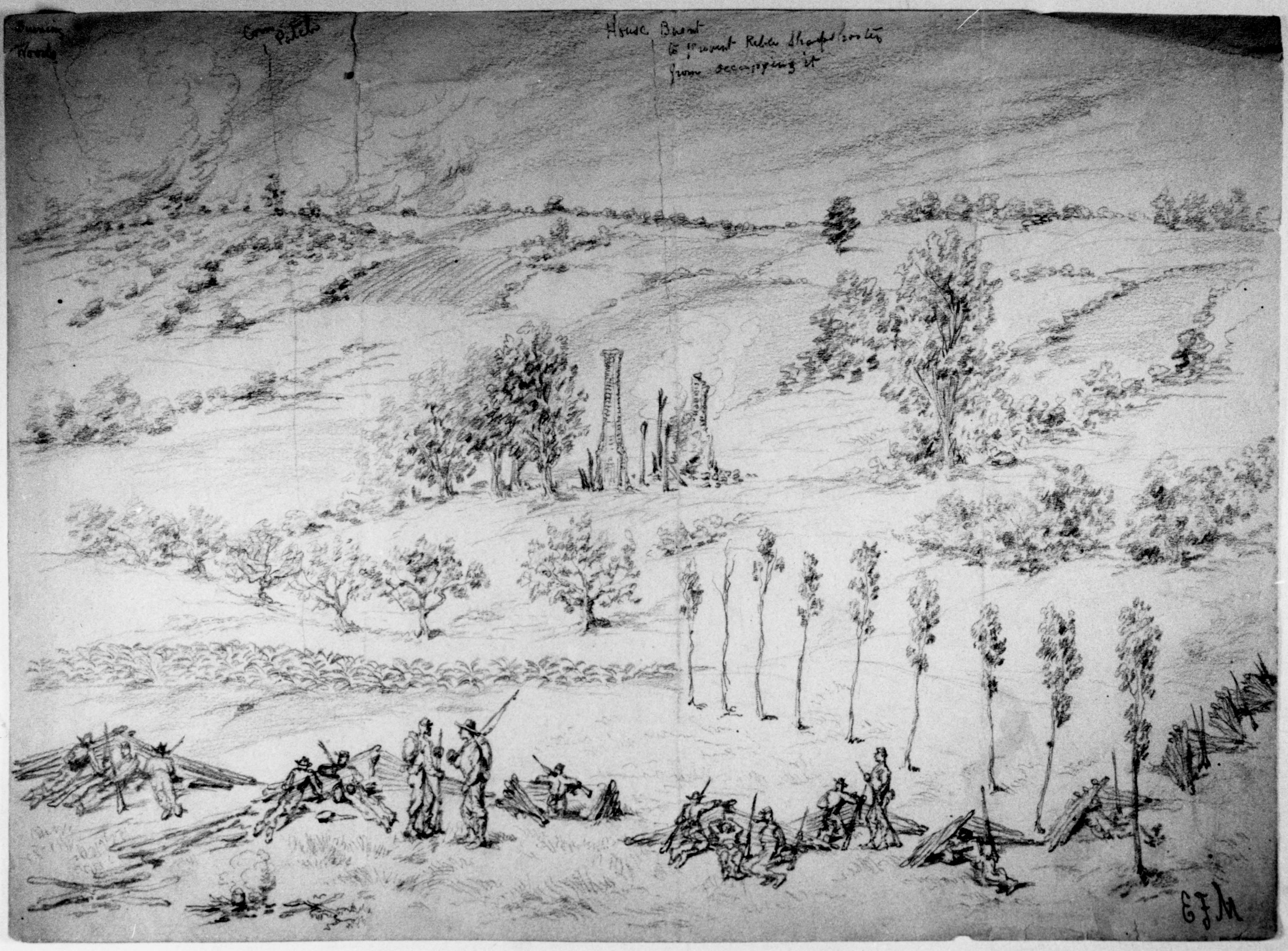
An 1864 sketch made by E. F. Mullens shortly after the Battle of Fort Stevens, showing the skirmish line and noting a house burned to keep it from being used by Confederate snipers.

Washington prepared for the Confederate assault amid one of the worst hot spells in its history. It lasted 47 days without rain, with temperatures exceeding 90 °F (32.2 °C). The U.S. Congress and prominent residents left town to escape the heat as much as the impending Confederate advance. However, President Lincoln remained near the city, staying with his family at the Soldier's Home in present-day Northwest Washington, although a steamer waited on the Potomac to evacuate them if the situation became dire. Meanwhile, refugees from surrounding counties began to enter the relative safety of the city.

Overall command for defense of the District was given to Major General Christopher C. Augur as commander of the XXII Corps. Major Generals Quincy Gillmore and Alexander McCook commanded the Northeast sector and the reserve post at Blagden Farm, respectively. Augur commanded 31,000 troops and 1,000 artillery pieces in 160 fortifications, batteries, and trenches. Eighty-seven fortifications were north of the Potomac (facing Early's approach) with 484 heavy guns and 13,986 men. Land was cleared surrounding the city to create open fields of fire. Six companies of the 8th Illinois Cavalry were stationed in front of the northern defenses.

Despite the impressive array, Washington's defenses were unformidable. General John G. Barnard, Grant's engineering officer, noted that many of the troops were not actually fit for duty because they were new recruits, untried reserves, recovering from wounds, or worn-out veterans. Barnard estimated that instead of 31,000, the actual number of usable troops was around 9,600. The capital was more vulnerable to Confederate attack than it seemed since with around 10,000 troops, the Confederate army matched the effective Union troop strength.

=== Union command structure ===
The arrival of the VI Corps, about 10,000 men, brought desperately needed veteran reinforcements. It also added another high-ranking officer into a jumbled Union command. The Washington defenses played host to a number of generals ejected from major theaters of the war or incapacitated for field command by wounds or disease. Maj. Gen. Alexander M. McCook, who had been relieved of command after the 1863 Battle of Chickamauga, was placed in command of the Defenses of the Potomac River & Washington, superseding Christopher Columbus Augur, who commanded the Department of Washington. Augur also commanded the XXII Corps, whose troops manned the capital's defensive works. Maj. Gen. Henry W. Halleck called upon Maj. Gen. Quincy A. Gillmore in New York City to take command of a detachment from the XIX Corps. The Union Army's Quartermaster General, Brig. Gen. Montgomery C. Meigs, took command of an "Emergency Division," composed of federal employees who were armed during the raid, directly under the command of McCook. Even Lincoln personally arrived at the battlefield. McCook tried to sort out the problem of too many high-ranking generals in the face of Early's advance. He was unable to rid himself of the generals, and their attempts to gain leverage over one another, but a somewhat-workable command structure was established. With McCook in overall command, Gillmore commanded the northeast line of fortresses (Fort Lincoln to Fort Totten), Meigs commanded the northern line of forts (Fort Totten to Fort DeRussy—including Fort Stevens) and Augur's First Division commander, Martin D. Hardin, commanded the northwest line of forts (Fort DeRussy to Fort Sumner). Wright and the VI Corps were initially to be held in reserve but McCook immediately decided against it and stated that he felt veteran troops needed to take the front lines against Early's troops.

As it was, Hardin's troops engaged in some light skirmishing, but as McCook intended, it was to be Wright's veterans who bore the brunt of the fighting.

== Battle ==
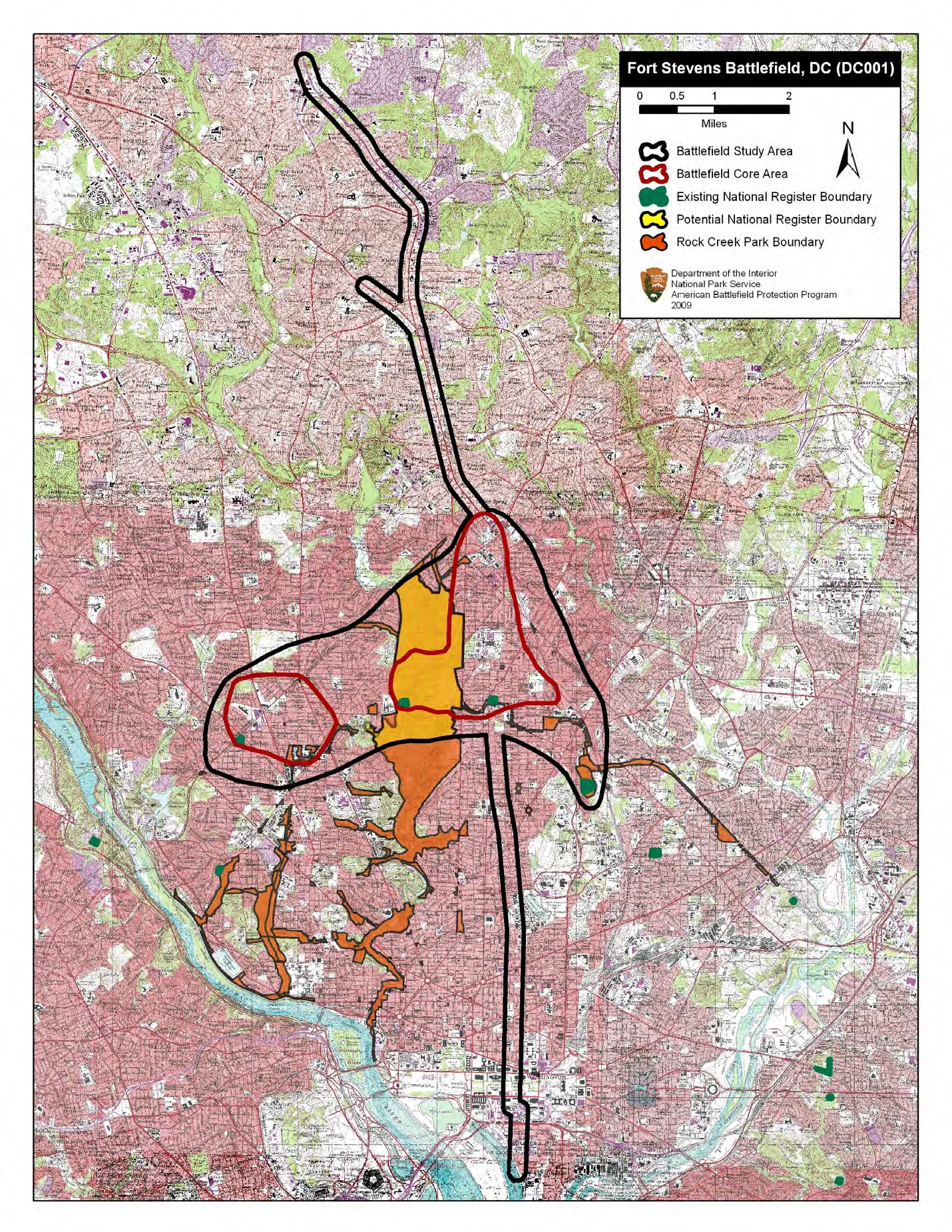
Map of Fort Stevens Battlefield core and study areas by the American Battlefield Protection Program

At about the time Wright's command was arriving in Washington, Early's corps began to arrive at the breastworks of Fort Stevens, yet Early delayed the attack because he was still unsure of the federal strength defending the fort, much of his army was still in transit to the front, and the troops he had were exhausted due to the excessive heat and the fact that they had been on the march since June 13. Additionally, many of the Confederate troops had looted the home of Montgomery Blair, the son of the founder of Silver Spring, Maryland. They found barrels of whiskey in the basement of the mansion, called Blair Mansion, and many troops were too drunk to get a good start in the morning. This allowed for further fortification by Union troops.

Around 3 p.m., with the bulk of their force present, the Confederates commenced skirmishing, probing the defense maintained by Brig. Gen. Martin D. Hardin's division of the XXII Corps with a line of skirmishers backed by artillery. Near the start of the Confederate attack the lead elements of the VI and XIX Corps arrived at the fort, reinforcing it with battle-hardened troops. The battle picked up around 5 p.m. when Confederate cavalry pushed through the advance Union picket line. A Union counterattack drove back the Confederate cavalry and the two opposing lines confronted each other throughout the evening with periods of intense skirmishing. The Union front was aided by artillery from the fort, which shelled Confederate positions, destroying many houses that Confederate sharpshooters used for protection.

President Lincoln, his wife Mary, and some officers rode out to observe the attack, either on July 11 or July 12, and were briefly under enemy fire that wounded a Union surgeon standing next to Lincoln on the Fort Stevens parapet. Lincoln was brusquely ordered to take cover by an officer, possibly Horatio Wright, although other probably apocryphal stories claim that it was Oliver Wendell Holmes Jr., Private John A. Bedient of the 150th Ohio Infantry, the fort commander, other privates of the Ohio National Guard, or Elizabeth Thomas.

Additional Union reinforcements from the VI and XIX Corps arrived overnight and were placed in reserve behind the line. The skirmishing continued into July 12, when Early finally decided that Washington could not be taken without heavy losses which would be too severe to warrant the attempt. Union artillery from Fort Stevens attempted to clear out Confederate sharpshooters hidden in the buildings and fields in front of the fort; when the artillery fire failed to drive them off, the VI Corps brigade of Daniel Bidwell, supported by Oliver Edwards' brigade and two Veteran Reserve Corps regiments, attacked at about 5 p.m. The attack was successful, but at the cost of over 300 men. VI Corps member Elisha Hunt Rhodes recalled:

We marched in the line of battle into a peach orchard in front of Fort Stevens, and here the fight began. For a short time it was warm work, but as the President and many ladies were looking at us, every man tried to do his best. Without our help the small force in the forts would have been overpowered. Jubal Early should have attacked earlier in the morning, but Early was late.

== Aftermath ==
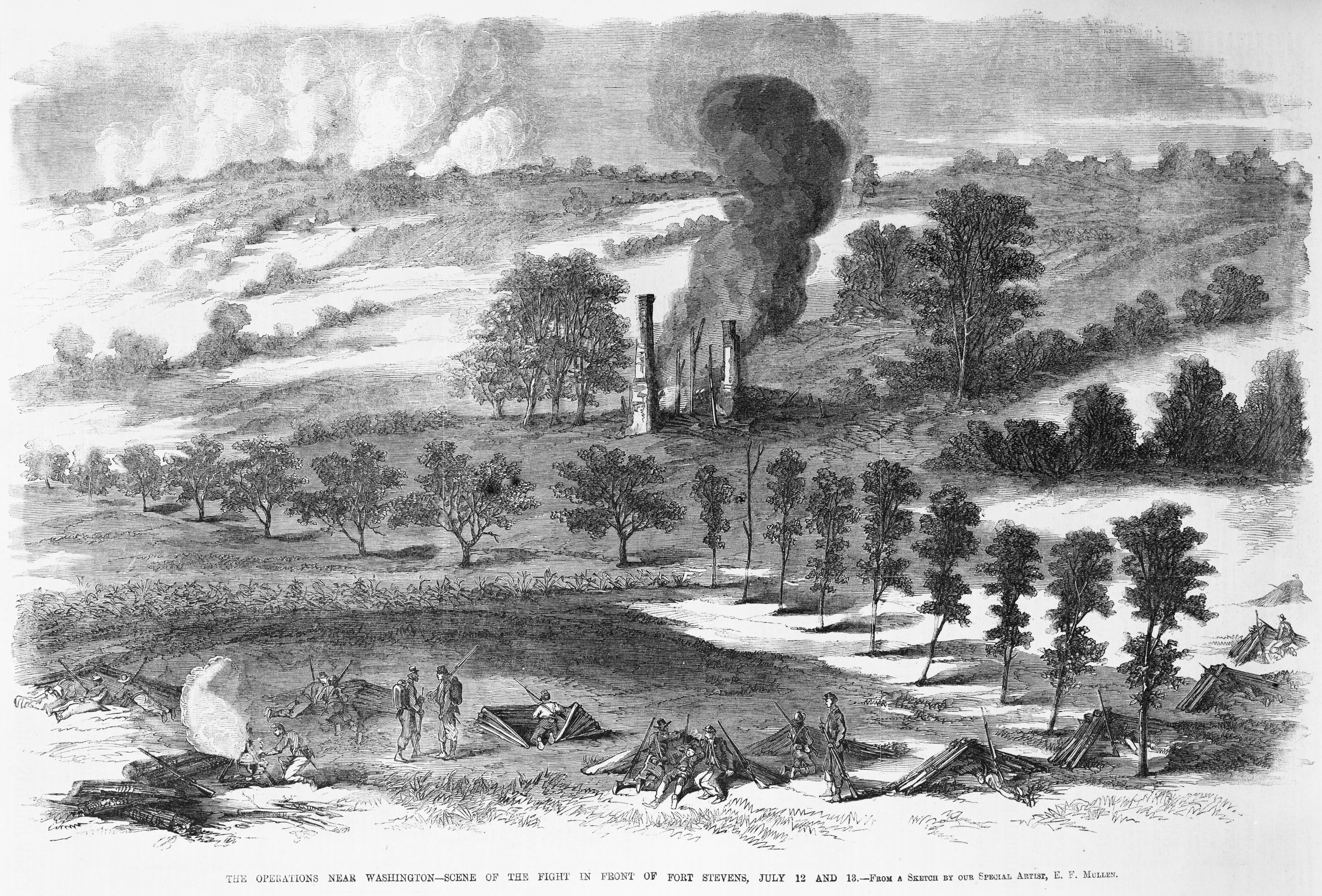
Scene of the fight in front of Fort Stevens, July 12 & 13, Frank Leslie's Illustrated Newspaper

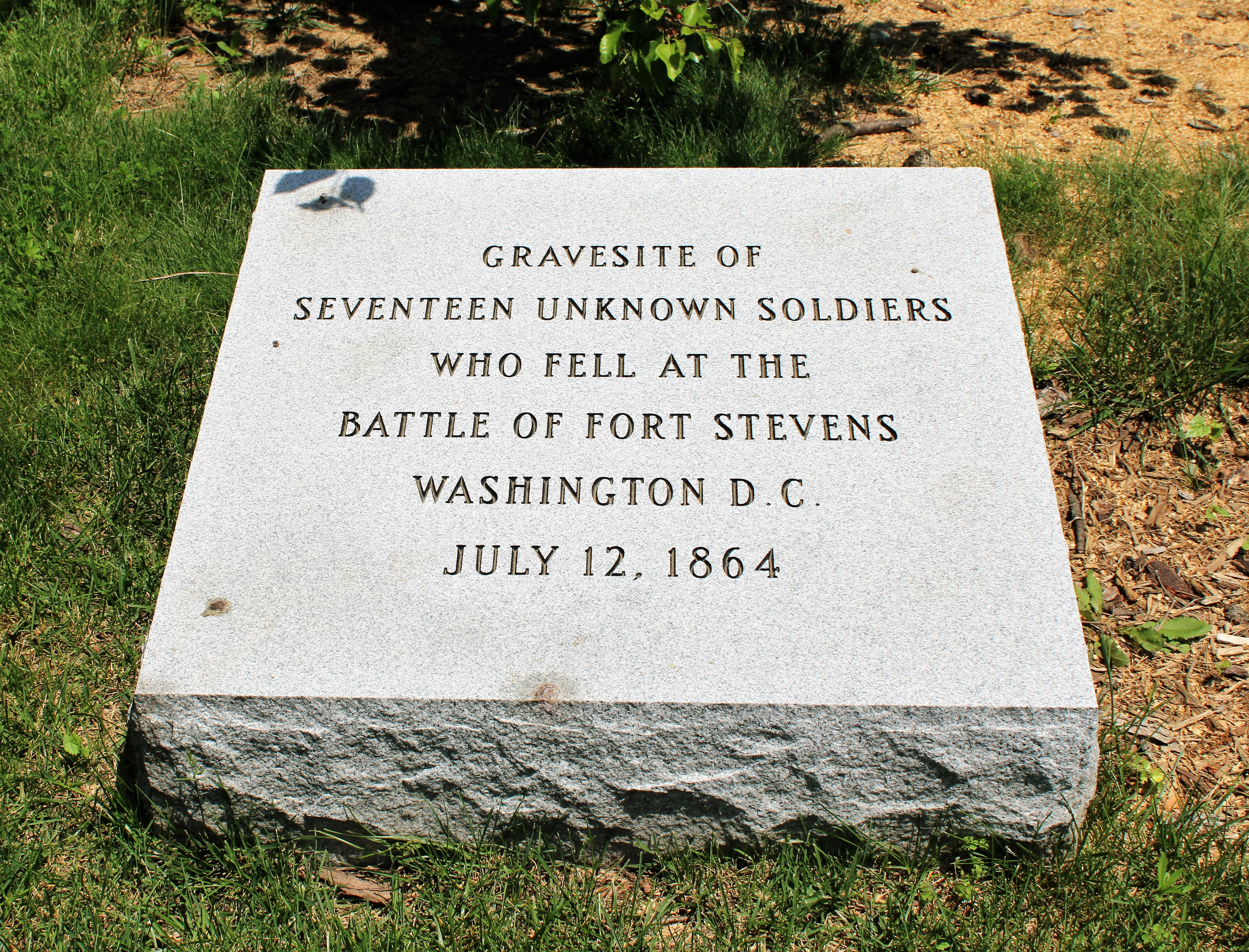
The grave in Silver Spring, Maryland of 17 unknown Confederate dead from the battle

Early's force withdrew that evening, headed back into Montgomery County, Maryland, and crossed the Potomac River on July 13 at White's Ferry into Leesburg, Virginia. The Confederates successfully brought the supplies they seized during the previous weeks with them into Virginia. Early remarked to one of his officers after the battle, "Major, we didn't take Washington but we scared Abe Lincoln like hell." Wright organized a pursuit force and set out after them during the afternoon of the 13th.

== Battlefield and cemeteries ==
Fort Stevens is now maintained by the National Park Service under the administration of the Civil War Defenses of Washington. The fort is located near 13th Street NW between Rittenhouse and Quackenbos Streets NW and is the only part of the battlefield currently preserved; the remainder was developed following 1925. The Battleground National Cemetery was established two weeks after the battle and is located nearby, at 6625 Georgia Avenue NW, containing the graves of 40 Union soldiers killed in the battle; 17 Confederate soldiers are buried on the grounds of Grace Episcopal Church, slightly north of current downtown Silver Spring, Maryland, at the intersection of Georgia Avenue and Grace Church Road. In 2020, the Grace Episcopal Church monument was damaged and later replaced by a smaller grave marker.

The Rev. James B. Avirett, the pastor at Grace Church, was instrumental in interring the Confederate soldiers at Grace Episcopal Church.

== See also ==
- Civil War Defenses of Washington
- Rock Creek Park
- Fort Stevens
- Battleground National Cemetery
- Washington, D.C., in the American Civil War
- Fort Slocum
- Fort Totten
- Fort Slemmer
- Fort Bunker Hill
- Fort Saratoga
- Fort Thayer
- Fort Lincoln

== Bibliography ==
- National National Park Service battle description
- Alvord, Henry E. (1897). Early's Attack upon Washington, July 1864. Washington, D.C.: Military Order of the United States, Commander of the District of Columbia.
- Bernstein, Steven (2011). The Confederacy's Last Northern Offensive: Jubal Early, the Army of the Valley and the Raid on Washington. Jefferson, North Carolina: McFarland & Company, Inc. ISBN 978-0-7864-5861-5.
- Cooling, Benjamin F. (1989). Jubal Early's Raid on Washington 1864. Baltimore, Maryland: Rockbridge Publishing Company. ISBN 0-933852-86-X.
- Cramer, John Henry (1948). Under Enemy Fire: The Complete Account of His Experiences During Early's Attack on Washington. Baton Rouge, Louisiana: Louisiana State University Press. ISBN 978-0-5983-6703-7.
- Judge, Joseph (1994). Season of Fire: The Confederate Strike on Washington. Berryville, Virginia: Rockbridge Publishing Company. ISBN 1-883522-00-5.
- Kennedy, Francis H. (1998). The Civil War Battlefield Guide. Boston, Massachusetts: Houghton Mifflin Co. ISBN 0-395-74012-6.
- Leepson, Marc. Desperate Engagement: How a Little-Known Civil War Battle Saved Washington D.C., and Changed American History. New York: Thomas Dunne Books (St. Martin's Press), 2005. ISBN 978-0-312-38223-0.
- Vandiver, Frank E. (1988). Jubal's Raid: General Early's Famous Attack on Washington in 1864. Lincoln, Nebraska: University of Nebraska Press. ISBN 978-0-8032-9610-7.
