= Battle of Walker's Ford =

Battle of the American Civil War

- Part of the American Civil War
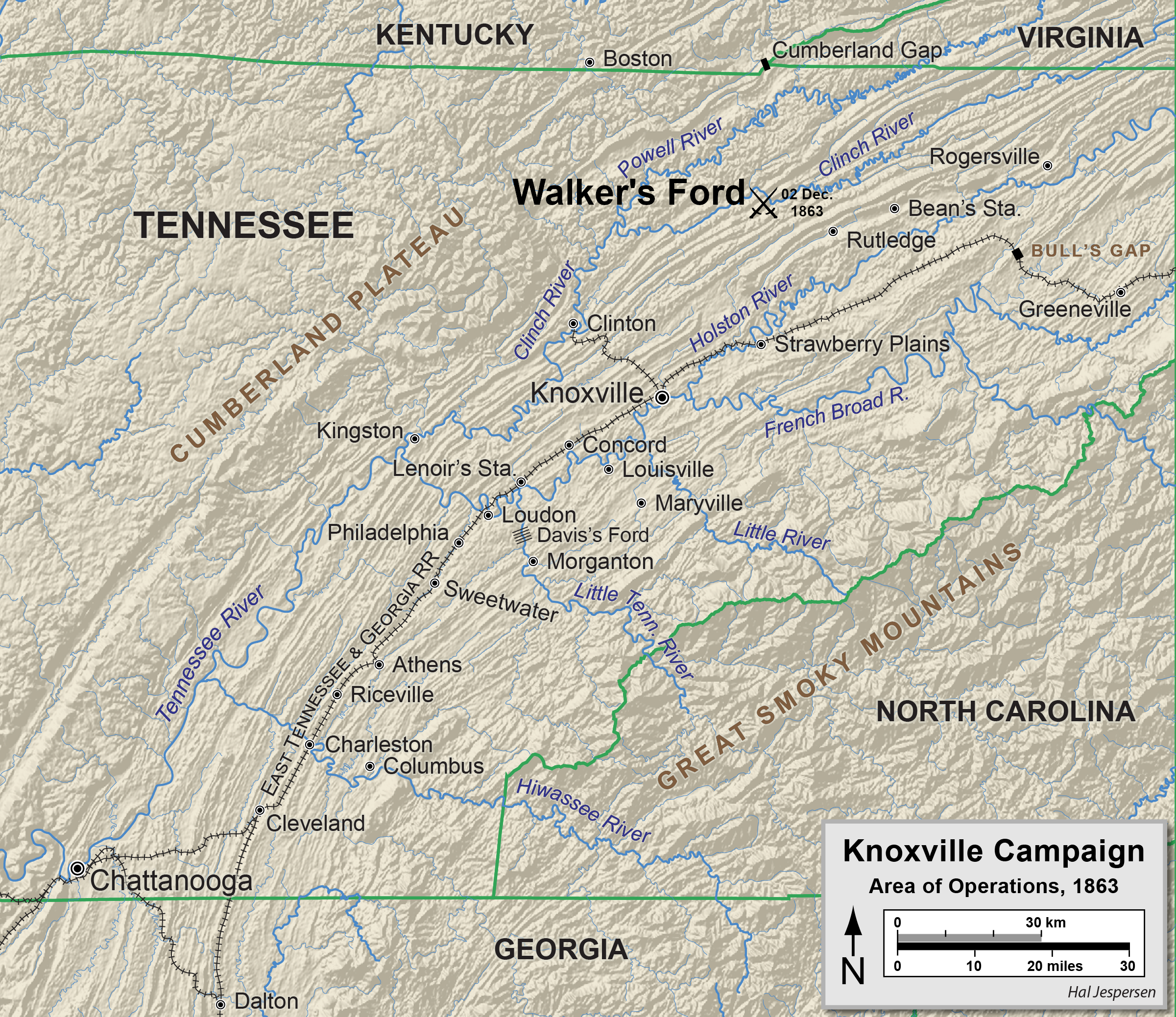
- Battle of Walker's Ford in the Knoxville Campaign
Date	December 2, 1863
Location	Walker's Ford, Clinch River 36°20′32″N 83°41′3″W
Result	Union tactical victory

Belligerents
United States (Union)	(Confederate States of America) CSA (Confederacy)

Commanders and leaders
(United States) Orlando B. Willcox (United States) Felix W. Graham	(Confederate States of America) William T. Martin

Units involved
Left Wing, Army of the Ohio	Armstrong's Division; Jones' Brigade

Strength
1,500	3,000

Casualties and losses
64	100

The Battle of Walker's Ford (December 2, 1863) saw three Confederate cavalry brigades led by Brigadier General William T. Martin attack a Union cavalry brigade under Colonel Felix W. Graham at Walker's Ford on the Clinch River during the Knoxville campaign of the American Civil War. After failing to trap Graham's brigade at Maynardville, Tennessee, Martin's cavalry pursued in the direction of Tazewell before encountering Graham's horsemen south of Walker's Ford in the morning. At first, Martin's cavalry pressed Graham's troopers back. However, Brigadier General Orlando B. Willcox arrived with a Union infantry brigade and repulsed the Confederate cavalry. Martin sent a cavalry brigade to envelop the Union force, but it was blocked by one of Graham's regiments at a nearby ford. Martin's Confederates soon withdrew toward Knoxville. Willcox's tentative probe failed to relieve Major General Ambrose Burnside's defenders in the Siege of Knoxville, but Major General William T. Sherman's much larger forces soon accomplished that task.

== Background ==
=== Union invasion ===
Major General Ambrose Burnside launched the Union invasion of East Tennessee in late August 1863, using two infantry divisions and cavalry from the XXIII Corps stationed in Kentucky. The operation was largely unopposed, and a Federal cavalry brigade led by John W. Foster occupied Knoxville on September 1. Burnside consolidated his control of the region at the Battle of the Cumberland Gap when he accepted the surrender of its 2,000-man Confederate garrison on September 9. The strategic situation underwent a dramatic change when General Braxton Bragg's Confederate Army of Tennessee defeated the Union Army of the Cumberland at the Battle of Chickamauga on September 19–20, 1863. The result was that Bragg blockaded the Army of the Cumberland within Chattanooga. Burnside was left largely on his own while the Union government rushed reinforcements to Chattanooga.

Major General John G. Parke reached East Tennessee with two divisions of IX Corps on September 20. Brigadier General Orlando B. Willcox and 3,000 6-month Indiana soldiers arrived at Cumberland Gap on October 3. Burnside ordered Willcox east to Bull's Gap to protect against a Confederate incursion from Virginia. The strength returns for October 1863 showed that Willcox's Left Wing Forces in East Tennessee counted 178 officers and 4,213 enlisted men present for duty. Willcox directed two infantry brigades, three artillery batteries, and two companies of cavalry. Colonel Wilson C. Lemert's brigade from IX Corps formed the garrison of Cumberland Gap but its troops were not counted as part of Willcox's Left Wing.

In early October, department commander Major General Samuel Jones sent a Confederate force under Brigadier General John Stuart Williams to threaten the eastern part of the Union area of control. Burnside rapidly moved the IX Corps troops to defeat Williams at the Battle of Blue Springs on October 10 and chased the Confederates back to Virginia. On October 20, two Confederate cavalry brigades mauled Colonel Frank Wolford's Federal cavalry brigade at the Battle of Philadelphia. In consequence, Burnside abandoned Loudon and withdrew to the north bank of the Tennessee River while still holding Kingston. A cavalry force led by Brigadier General William E. "Grumble" Jones surprised and routed a Union cavalry brigade at the Battle of Rogersville on November 6, inflicting 655 casualties, mostly captured.

=== Siege of Knoxville ===
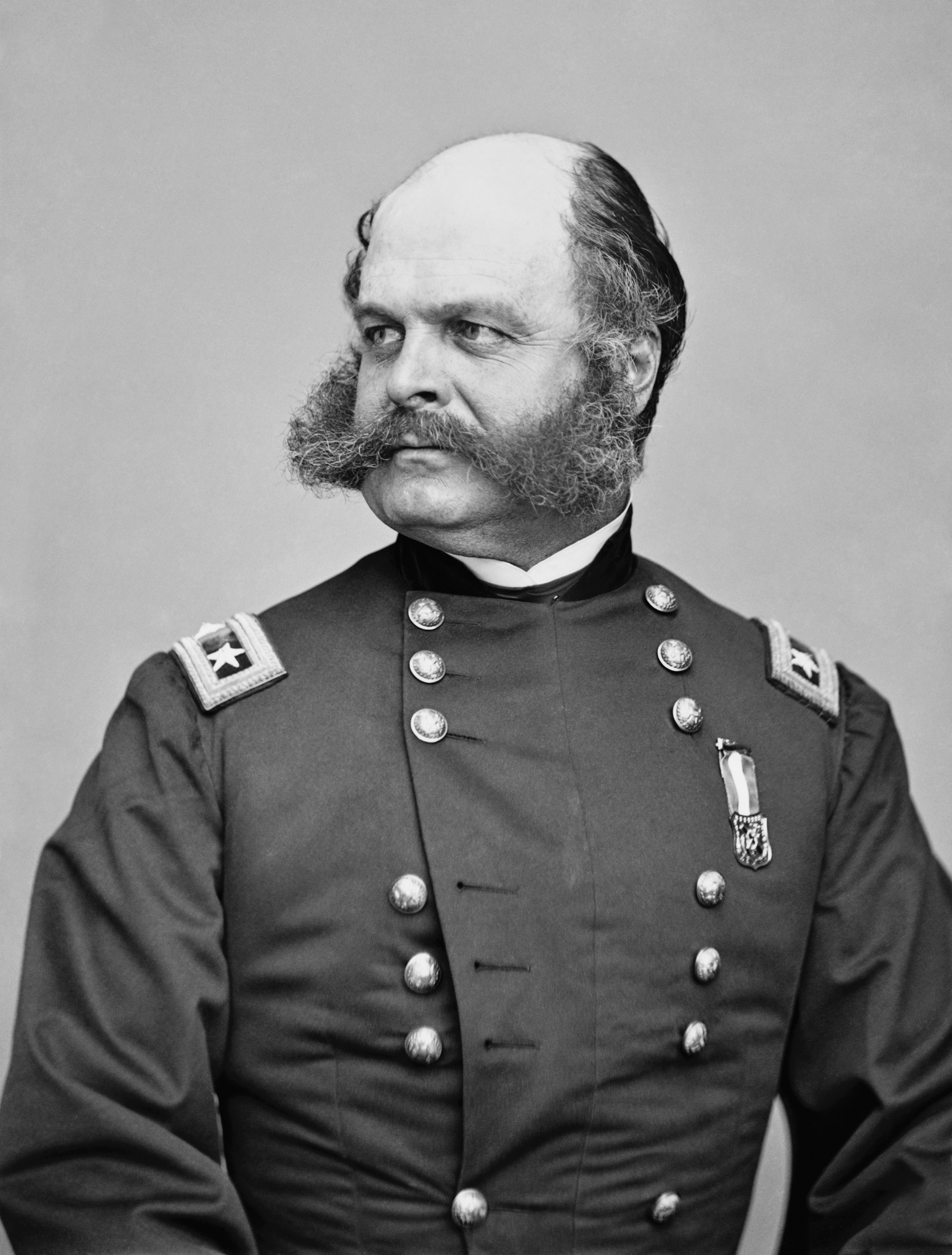
Ambrose Burnside

At the end of October 1863, Bragg decided to send Lieutenant General James Longstreet and two divisions to recapture Knoxville. Bragg was upset with Longstreet's bungled attempt to cut the Army of the Cumberland's newly established Cracker Line at the Battle of Wauhatchie on October 28. In addition, Bragg saw this as an opportunity to remove Longstreet from his army, since the two men disliked each other. Longstreet's two divisions under Major General Lafayette McLaws and Brigadier General Micah Jenkins and two artillery battalions began pulling out of Bragg's lines on November 4. Since Bragg ordered Major General Joseph Wheeler's cavalry to cooperate in the operation, Longstreet commanded 10,000 infantry, 5,000 cavalry, and 35 guns. On November 14, Longstreet's troops crossed to the north bank of the Tennessee River near Loudon. In the Battle of Campbell's Station on November 16, Longstreet attempt to stop Burnside's withdrawal to Knoxville was unsuccessful. At the same time, Wheeler tried to overrun Knoxville's defenses on the south bank, but ultimately failed. Longstreet imposed a semi-siege on Burnside's troops at Knoxville. The city was not besieged in the normal sense because Burnside's men were able to move supplies into the city via the south bank.

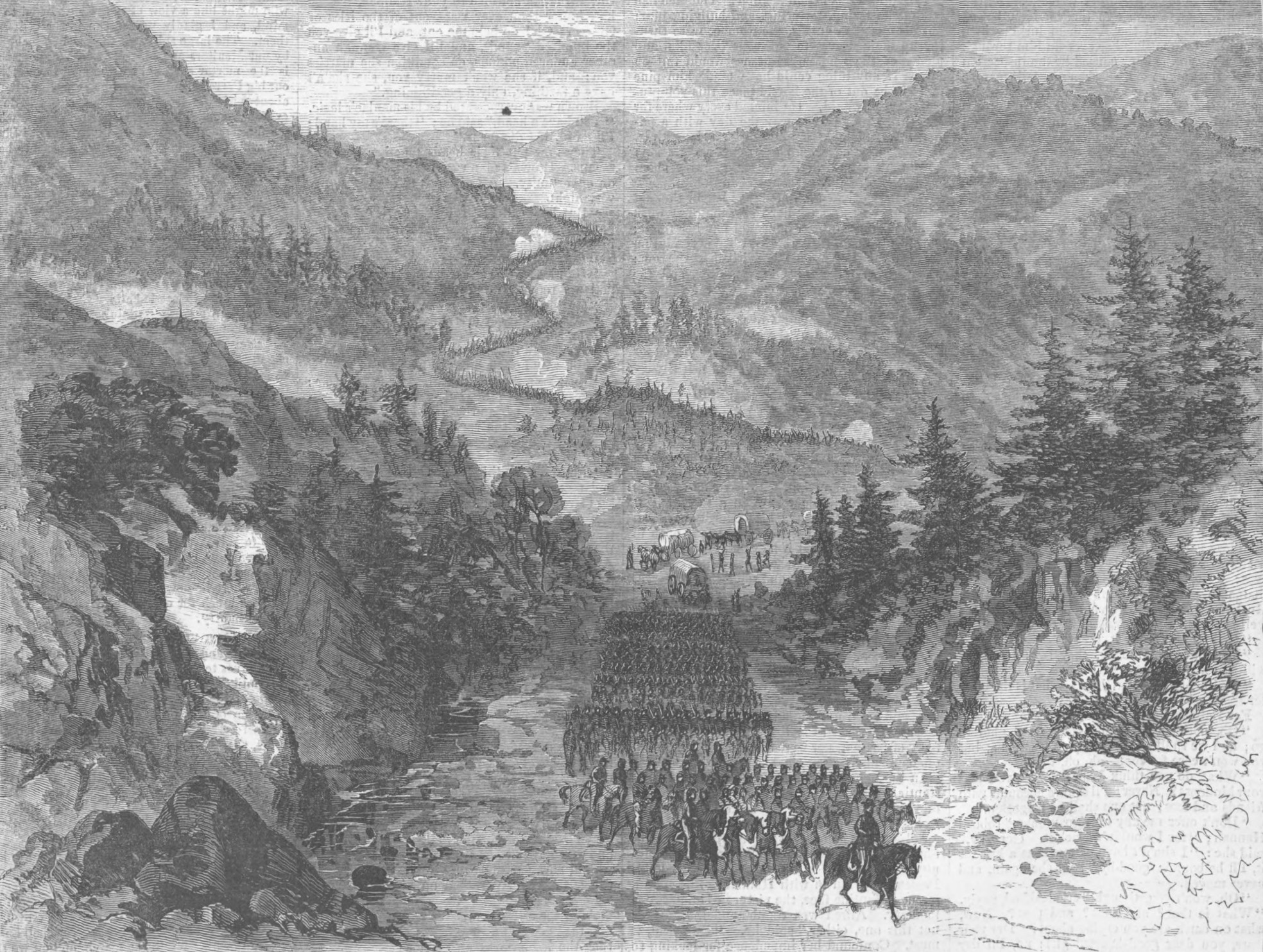
Union troops marched through Cumberland Gap in September 1863.

On November 14, Burnside telegraphed Willcox to continue holding Bull's Gap and Greeneville, but to withdraw to Cumberland Gap if necessary. At the same time, Willcox was ordered to send Hoskins' brigade to Knoxville. This left Willcox with the four Indiana infantry regiments, three batteries, the 32nd Kentucky Infantry Regiment, the 11th Michigan Battery, a small North Carolina unit, and two battalions of East Tennessee recruits. In addition, Willcox directed a Union cavalry division under Colonel John W. Foster consisting of two cavalry brigades led by Colonels Israel Garrard and Felix W. Graham.

Burnside sent a final order to Willcox before the telegraph line was cut; Willcox was to retreat to Cumberland Gap to protect the Union line of communications between there and Camp Nelson in Kentucky. By November 19, Willcox pulled his units back as far as Bean's Station. The next day, Willcox reached Cumberland Gap where he found scarcely enough provisions to feed its garrison, let alone his 6,000 troops. Fall rains made it nearly impossible for wagons to reach Cumberland Gap from Camp Nelson. Willcox dispersed his infantry in order for the soldiers to forage for food and posted most of his cavalry near Tazewell to observe Longstreet. Willcox's cavalry recaptured a herd of hogs near Jacksboro and even foraged in Lee County, Virginia. Meanwhile, hundreds of pro-Union refugees fled the Knoxville area, heading for Kentucky by way of Cumberland Gap.

At this time, Major General Ulysses S. Grant planned to attack Bragg's Confederate army near Chattanooga, but he experienced delays. Grant criticized Willcox for retreating to Cumberland Gap, not realizing that Willcox followed direct orders from Burnside. Willcox was under pressure from Grant to march to the relief of Knoxville, yet no one issued explicit orders to do so. Burnside sent a message through the siege lines asking that cavalry be sent south of the Clinch River. Hearing by telegraph from Grant that the Battle of Missionary Ridge had commenced, Willcox passed this information through the siege lines to Burnside via secret messenger. Knowing that Grant's forces were finally in motion, Willcox determined to carry out Burnside's instructions. At about this time, 250 soldiers from the 16th Illinois Cavalry Regiment led by Major Beeres rode northeast from Cumberland Gap and surprised Colonel Campbell Slemp's 64th Virginia Mounted Infantry Regiment at Jonesville, Virginia. Beeres claimed that the Confederates lost 20 killed and 26 captured and were routed.

== Battle ==
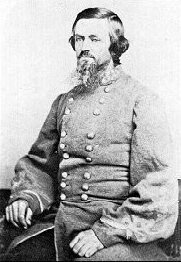
George G. Dibrell

Burnside had requested to be relieved of command, but his replacement, Major General John G. Foster did not reach Cumberland Gap until November 30. Meanwhile, Willcox assigned Garrard's brigade to hold Bean's Station and sent Graham's brigade to Tazewell on November 27. Following the Straight Creek Road, Graham crossed the Clinch River at Walker's Ford and reached Maynardville on November 29. The next day, Graham advanced 15 mi (24 km) farther south but pulled back to Maynardville. That day, "Grumble" Jones' Confederate brigade skirmished with Graham's troopers near Maynardville. When Foster arrived to take command, he approved Willcox's strategy. Longstreet responded to Graham's incursion by ordering Brigadier General Frank Crawford Armstrong's division to oppose it. Armstrong withdrew his two brigades under Colonels George Gibbs Dibrell and Thomas Harrison from Cherokee Heights on the south side of Knoxville on November 30 and crossed to the north bank. By the evening of December 1, Armstrong's troops joined Jones near Maynardville. Martin was in overall command of the three Confederate cavalry brigades.

Graham's brigade consisted of 57 officers and 1,031 enlisted men, for a total strength of 1,088. Attached artillery included 4 guns of Colvin's Illinois Battery and 2 rifled guns belonging to the 5th Indiana Cavalry Regiment. Leaving Cumberland Gap with a minimum garrison and with Foster's approval, Willcox started south toward Tazewell with the infantry on December 1. Graham sensed that the Confederate forces facing him had increased, so he abandoned Maynardville at midnight. Leaving Company M, 5th Indiana Cavalry in Maynardville as a picket, Graham's brigade marched northeast and stopped at 5 am on December 2 at Brock's House, about 4 mi (6.4 km) south of Walker's Ford. This place was in a wide gap in Lone Mountain, which runs southwest to northeast, like the other ridges in the area. Hind's Ridge was 2 mi (3.2 km) south of Brock's House. Willcox arrived at Tazewell with the infantry late on December 1 to receive Graham's latest situation report.

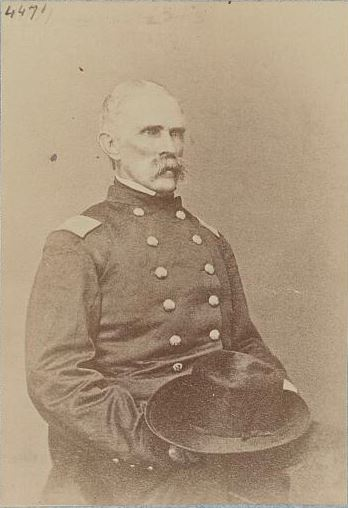
Horace Capron

Martin tried to cut off Graham's brigade at Maynardville using Armstrong's two brigades, but found that the Union cavalry were largely gone. Jones' brigade stormed into the town from the southwest, capturing some of Company M and routing the others. Dibrell mounted a swift pursuit with the 8th Tennessee Cavalry. While riding over the icy road across Hind's Ridge, the Confederates were ambushed by a Union vedette but fought their way through it. Rushing on, they surprised and pushed back Graham's brigade at 7:30 am. Graham's cavalrymen withdrew a short distance to Yeadon's Farm where they dismounted and formed along a fence line, their position buttressed by a log house that they converted into a fort. Graham posted two battalions of the 5th Indiana in the center, the 65th Indiana Mounted Infantry on the left, one company each of the 5th and 65th Indiana on the right, and two companies of the 5th Indiana and a section of Colvin's Illinois Battery in reserve. The other 2-gun section of Colvin's Battery was posted on the north bank at Walker's Ford.

The Confederates tried to overrun the position with a cavalry charge, but it was driven off and Dibrell was wounded; Colonel Daniel W. Holman assumed command of Dibrell's brigade. After more fighting, the 11th Tennessee dismounted and turned the Union right flank, causing Graham to order a retreat closer to Walker's Ford and ask for assistance. Meanwhile, Willcox set out from Tazewell at dawn on December 2 and reached the north bank of Walker's Ford with Colonel George W. Jackson's brigade. Receiving Graham's message for help, Jackson led the 116th Indiana and 118th Indiana Infantry Regiments and Captain James W. Patterson's 21st Ohio Battery across the river. Showing remarkable spunk for untested recruits, the Indiana foot soldiers formed a line about 1 mi (1.6 km) south of Walker's Ford and let the cavalry, which was almost out of ammunition, retreat through them. When Armstrong's cavalry attacked with artillery support, the Indianans and Patterson's guns repulsed them without much trouble.

Before the clash at Yeadon's Farm, Graham noticed that part of the Confederate cavalry was leaving the field. Anticipating that his opponents were trying to outflank his position, Graham ordered Colonel Horace Capron to take his 14th Illinois Cavalry Regiment and cover the next ford. Accordingly, the 14th Illinois crossed to the north bank at Walker's Ford and rode east to a ford at the mouth of Black Fox Creek. Crossing to the south bank, Capron's 324-man regiment rode about 2 mi (3.2 km) south. At 10 am Jones' Confederate brigade attacked the 14th Illinois and pressed it back. Capron posted one battalion and four mountain howitzers on the north bank of the Clinch River for a final stand. However, this was not necessary because the other two battalions brought Jones' brigade to a halt on the south side of the river by 3 pm. With the regiment almost out of ammunition, Capron left two companies with most of the remaining ammunition to defend the ford and rejoined the brigade at Walker's Ford. The two companies were soon relieved by an infantry regiment.

Willcox's infantry division was commanded by Colonel John I. Curtin. While Jackson's brigade was sent to Walker's Ford, a second brigade was sent on a road farther east. When Willcox sent Curtin and two infantry regiments to Walker's Ford, he held back one infantry regiment under Colonel John R. Mahan as a reserve. The unit that arrived at the ford at Black Fox Creek was the 129th Ohio Infantry Regiment, which was part of Lemert's IX Corps brigade.

== Results ==
According to the Official Records, the Union force sustained 64 casualties. Historian Earl J. Hess estimated Confederates losses as 100 out of 3,000 men engaged and Union strength as 1,500. The Confederates did not report their losses, but Graham suggested that they lost 25 killed, 50 wounded, and 28 prisoners. Martin's cavalry withdrew a short distance before camping for the night. The next morning, they headed for Knoxville. Hess called the battle a Union tactical victory, but it was barren of strategic results because Martin blocked Willcox's cautious probe. However, Longstreet could not ignore Sherman's army of 30,000 Union infantry and 3,000 cavalry. This mass of soldiers began moving north from Chattanooga on November 28. By December 3, Sherman's troops were in Loudon. That day, Longstreet sent his wagon train moving northeast toward Virginia. On the night of December 4, the Confederates lifted the siege of Knoxville and withdrew northeast toward Rutledge.

== Forces ==
=== Union order of battle ===
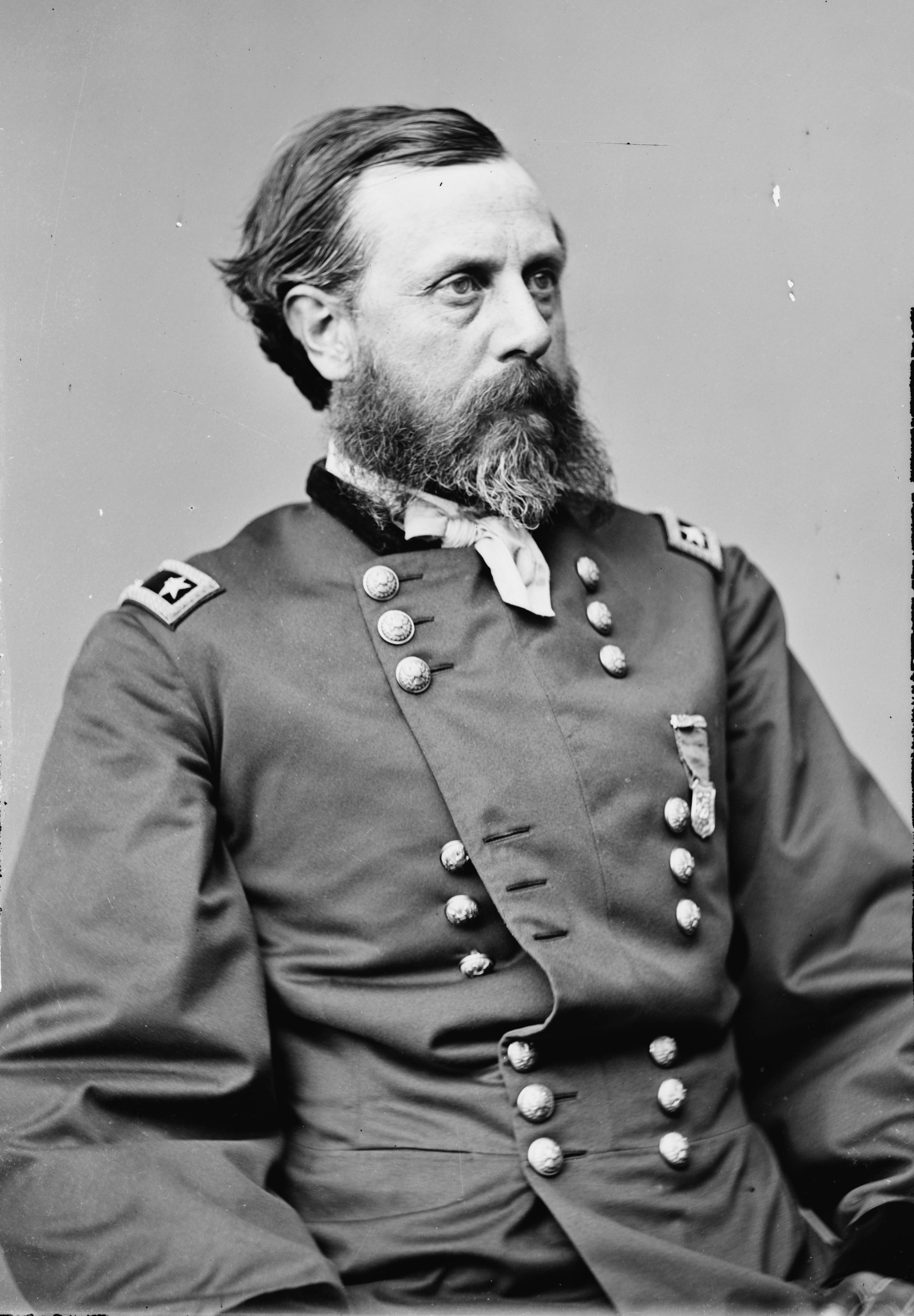
Orlando B. Willcox

Brigadier General Orlando B. Willcox
Commanding Left Wing, Army of the Ohio

Union order of battle for the Battle of Walker's Ford
Division	Brigade	Unit	Killed	Wounded	Missing
2nd Division; Cavalry Corps; Colonel; John W. Foster	2nd Brigade; Colonel; Felix W. Graham	14th Illinois Cavalry Regiment: Col. Horace Capron - 4 mountain howitzers	0	7	0
2nd Division; Cavalry Corps; Colonel; John W. Foster	2nd Brigade; Colonel; Felix W. Graham	5th Indiana Cavalry Regiment: Lt. Col. Thomas H. Butler - 2 "8-inch rifles" (Note: The Official Records and Hess stated that the 5th Indiana Cavalry had two 8-inch rifles (Official Records, p. 293; Hess, p. 260). An 8-inch rifle weighed 6,500 lbs. This was far too heavy to use as field artillery (Ripley, pp. 366–367). This may be a typographical error for the 820 lb. 3-inch Ordnance rifle or the 915 lb. 3.8-inch James rifle (Ripley, p. 374).)	5	12	12
2nd Division; Cavalry Corps; Colonel; John W. Foster	2nd Brigade; Colonel; Felix W. Graham	65th Indiana Infantry Regiment (mounted): Capt. Walter G. Hodge	2	6	0
2nd Division; Cavalry Corps; Colonel; John W. Foster	2nd Brigade; Colonel; Felix W. Graham	Colvin's Illinois Battery: Capt. John H. Colvin - 4 guns	0	0	0
Left Wing Infantry; Colonel; John I. Curtin (Note: There were three other Union infantry regiments in the area, certainly the 129th Ohio (Official Records, p. 396), and probably the 115th Indiana and 117th Indiana Infantry Regiments (Official Records, p. 816).)	2nd Brigade; Colonel; George W. Jackson	116th Indiana Infantry Regiment: Col. William R. Kise	1	4	0
Left Wing Infantry; Colonel; John I. Curtin	2nd Brigade; Colonel; George W. Jackson	118th Indiana Infantry Regiment: Lt. Col. Henry C. Elliott	1	14	0
Left Wing Infantry; Colonel; John I. Curtin	2nd Brigade; Colonel; George W. Jackson	21st Ohio Battery: Capt. James W. Patterson - 12-pounder Napoleons	0	0	0

=== Confederate order of battle ===
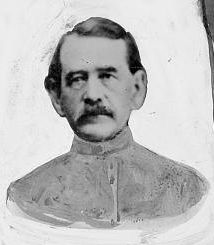
William T. Martin

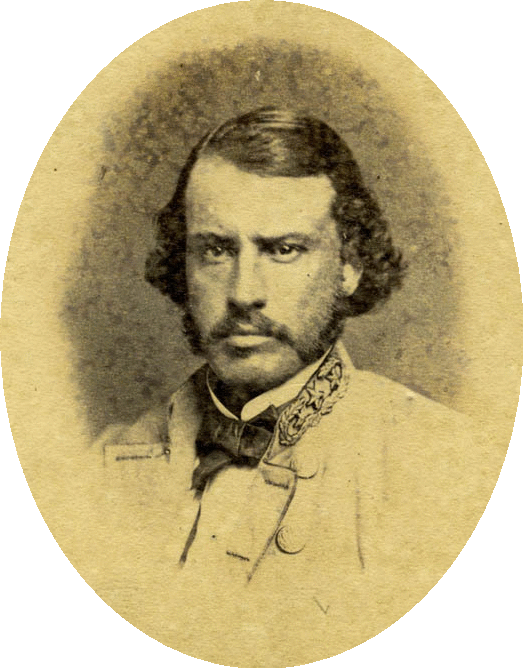
Frank C. Armstrong

Brigadier General William T. Martin
Commanding Cavalry Corps, Army of Tennessee

Confederate order of battle for the Battle of Walker's Ford
Division	Brigade	Unit
Armstrong's Division; Brigadier General; Frank C. Armstrong	Dibrell's Brigade; Colonel; George Gibbs Dibrell	4th Tennessee Cavalry Regiment: Lt. Col. Paul F. Anderson
Armstrong's Division; Brigadier General; Frank C. Armstrong	Dibrell's Brigade; Colonel; George Gibbs Dibrell	5th Tennessee Cavalry Regiment:
Armstrong's Division; Brigadier General; Frank C. Armstrong	Dibrell's Brigade; Colonel; George Gibbs Dibrell	8th Tennessee Cavalry Regiment: Lt. Col. Ferdinand H. Daughtery
Armstrong's Division; Brigadier General; Frank C. Armstrong	Dibrell's Brigade; Colonel; George Gibbs Dibrell	9th Tennessee Cavalry Regiment: Col. Jacob B. Biffle
Armstrong's Division; Brigadier General; Frank C. Armstrong	Dibrell's Brigade; Colonel; George Gibbs Dibrell	10th Tennessee Cavalry Regiment: Col. Nicholas N. Cox
Armstrong's Division; Brigadier General; Frank C. Armstrong	Harrison's Brigade; Colonel; Thomas Harrison	3rd Arkansas Cavalry Regiment: Lt. Col. M. J. Henderson
Armstrong's Division; Brigadier General; Frank C. Armstrong	Harrison's Brigade; Colonel; Thomas Harrison	8th Texas Cavalry Regiment: Lt. Col. Gustave Cook
Armstrong's Division; Brigadier General; Frank C. Armstrong	Harrison's Brigade; Colonel; Thomas Harrison	11th Texas Cavalry Regiment: Lt. Col. J. M. Bounds
Ransom's Division (Note: Ransom's division belonged to Major General Samuel Jones' Department of Western Virginia and East Tennessee. Ransom was not present at the battle.); Major General; Robert Ransom Jr.	Jones' Brigade; Brigadier General; William E. Jones	8th Virginia Cavalry Regiment: Lt. Col. A. F. Cook
Ransom's Division; Major General; Robert Ransom Jr.	Jones' Brigade; Brigadier General; William E. Jones	21st Virginia Cavalry Regiment: Capt. W. H. Balthis
Ransom's Division; Major General; Robert Ransom Jr.	Jones' Brigade; Brigadier General; William E. Jones	27th Virginia Cavalry Battalion: Lt. Col. Henry A. Edmundson
Ransom's Division; Major General; Robert Ransom Jr.	Jones' Brigade; Brigadier General; William E. Jones	34th Virginia Cavalry Battalion: Lt. Col. V. A. Witcher (Note: Hess, p. 261 listed Witcher commanding the 27th Virginia Cavalry Battalion and omitted the 34th Virginia Cavalry Battalion. The 27th and 34th and their commanders are both listed on Hess, p. 264 and that information is shown in the table. Battles and Leaders, p. 439 confirmed Witcher as commander of the 34th Virginia Cavalry Battalion.)
Ransom's Division; Major General; Robert Ransom Jr.	Jones' Brigade; Brigadier General; William E. Jones	36th Virginia Cavalry Battalion: Capt. C. T. Smith
Ransom's Division; Major General; Robert Ransom Jr.	Jones' Brigade; Brigadier General; William E. Jones	37th Virginia Cavalry Battalion: Maj. James R. Claiborne

== Locations of interest ==
- Union County, Tennessee
- Walker's Ford Road and Walker Ford Lookout Tower

== Notes ==
Footnotes

Citations
