= David Van Buskirk =

Tall soldier from Indiana (1826–1886)

David Campbell Van Buskirk
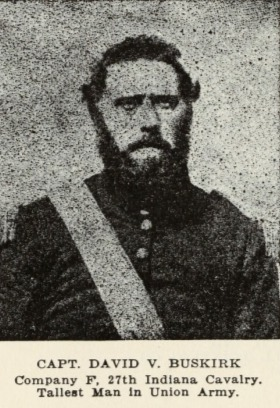
- Buskirk c.1861

County Treasurer for Monroe County, Indiana
- In office 1866–1870

Personal details
- Born: David Campbell Van Buskirk; November 23, 1826 Bean Blossom Township, Monroe County, Indiana
- Died: August 12, 1886 (aged 59) Monroe County, Indiana
- Resting place: Van Buskirk Cemetery; Bean Blossom Township, Indiana
- Other political affiliations: Republican
- Spouse(s): Lucy Ann Buskirk; Martha J. Stephenson; Mary Stephenson
- Occupation: Farmer soldier politician
- Nickname: Big Dave

Military service
- Allegiance: United States of America
- Branch/service: Union Army
- Years of service: 1861–1864
- Rank: Captain
- Unit: 27th Indiana Infantry Regiment
- Commands: Company F, 27th Indiana Infantry Regiment
- Battles/wars: American Civil War

David Campbell Van Buskirk (November 23, 1826 – August 12, 1886), also spelled as David V. Buskirk, was an American soldier and politician from Bloomington, Indiana, made famous for his great height. He was 6 ft 10 in (2.08 m) tall and weighed roughly 300 lb (136 kg). Dubbed "the biggest Yankee in the world", Van Buskirk is noted by multiple sources as being the tallest man in the Union Army during the American Civil War.

== Early life ==
David Campbell Van Buskirk was born on November 23, 1826, in Bean Blossom Township near Gosport, Indiana, to parents James Van Buskirk (1796–1874) and Mariah Campbell Van Buskirk (1804–1886), he was the eldest of ten children. The Van Buskirk family was of Scotch-Irish and German ancestry and traces its lineage to Isaac Van Buskirk (1760–1843), a veteran of the American Revolutionary War who settled land in modern-day Monroe County, Indiana, in the 1820s. Van Buskirk's uncle, John Van Buskirk (1792–1846), was a veteran of the War of 1812 and was wounded at the Battle of Tippecanoe. Van Buskirk had a normal upbringing and was well-educated, he later worked his family's farm raising and trading cattle. The Van Buskirk family farm consisted of 450 acres of land near the White River complete with a main house, storage houses, an orchard, and family cemetery. Indiana historian Harvey Morris described Buskirk as "weighing 390 pounds, and stood six feet ten inches in his stockings".

== Military service ==
At the outbreak of the American Civil War Van Buskirk enlisted as a Private into Company F of the 27th Indiana Infantry Regiment on August 30, 1861, under Captain Peter Kopp (also spelled Kop). Similar to other large soldiers such as Martin Van Buren Bates, Van Buskirk was noted by many in the regiment for his stature and weight, causing fellow soldiers to affectionately nicknamed him "Big Dave".

According to historian Andrew Martin, 67 of the 101 men in Van Buskirk's original company roster were at least 6 ft (1.82 m) tall, which at the time was considered large. Van Buskirk's Company F was nicknamed the "New Albany Railroad Company" due to the fact that many of the men were previous employees of the Monon Railroad (then called the Louisville, New Albany and Chicago Railroad). Other nicknames given to the company were the "Monroe County Grenadiers". The company was originally commanded by Captain Peter "Big Pete" Kopp of Bloomington, Indiana who was also a man of large size and stature with Francis Ottwell and David chosen as his Lieutenants.

Indiana historian Harvey Morris described Van Buskirk as being "always approachable, to everybody and he had no hesitancy in approaching others. A major-general was no more to him than a private soldier. Owing to his absolute sincerity and utter absence of asperity, as much as to his size, no one ever took offense at anything he said". Van Buskirk and the rest of the 27th Indiana fought in the Army of the Potomac during the Peninsula campaign as part of the 3rd Brigade of the 1st Division of General Nathaniel P. Banks's V Corps.

Van Buskirk was captured as a prisoner of war following the First Battle of Winchester on May 25, 1862, and was held in Libby Prison for several months. During his imprisonment he met with President of the Confederate States of America Jefferson Davis who later had him placed on exhibition in Richmond, Virginia, which allowed him better treatment than the average soldier. Van Buskirk was later paroled and exchanged on September 21, 1862, upon his release from captivity Van Buskirk had gained twenty pounds weighing in at 400 due to his preferential treatment as a prisoner of war.

Van Buskirk would later fight in the Battle of Antietam on September 17, 1862. The rest of the 27th Indiana fought at Miller's Cornfield near Nicodemus Hill and was nicknamed "the company of giants" by Confederate soldiers of the Army of Northern Virginia due to their sheer size. Van Buskirk was promoted to the rank of Captain of Company F on September 19, 1862, following the death of Captain Peter Kopp at the Battle of Antietam. Van Buskirk would later fight in the Gettysburg campaign, during a 25-hour forced march through Pennsylvania during the Battle of Gettysburg it is stated that Van Buskirk wore out five different horses due to his weight.

Van Buskirk would continue to fight in the war well into the Atlanta campaign in 1864 when he was forced to resign his commission due to a disability involving increased attacks of rheumatism on April 26, 1864. Despite the veracity of the campaigns he fought in and his imprisonment, Van Buskirk was never wounded during the war.

== Later life ==
Following the war Van Buskirk was elected as the county treasurer for Monroe County, Indiana, and held the office from 1866 to 1870. In 1876 Van Buskirk ran for the office Indiana State Treasurer but was defeated by Benjamin C. Shaw. Van Buskirk was also heavily involved with the Grand Army of the Republic and other veteran organizations. Van Buskirk died of Dropsy (Edema) on August 12, 1886, at the age of 59 in Monroe County near Gosport. Due to the size of his body a custom coffin had to be made inside of his home and his body transported through a window in order to remove him from his home. He is buried on his family plot in Bean Blossom Township.

== Personal life ==
Van Buskirk married three different times during his life and had a total of 8 children. His first wife was Lucy Ann Van Buskirk (1827–1866) who he had six children with. Lucy was Van Buskirk's first cousin and the daughter of his paternal uncle Isaac Van Buskirk (1791–1870). Van Buskirk's second wife was Martha J. Stephenson (1837–1873) who he had two more children with. Van Buskirk's last wife was Mary Stephenson (1830–1912). One of Van Buskirk's 14-year-old sons, David "Scroggy" Campbell Van Buskirk (1850–1931), who was also considered overtly tall, managed to join Company C 115th Indiana Infantry Regiment which saw action at the Battle of Blue Springs in 1863 and the Battle of Walker's Ford in 1864.

== See also ==
- List of tallest people
- List of people from Indiana
