= 118th Indiana Infantry Regiment =

118th Regiment Indiana Infantry
- Active: August 1863 – March 1–4, 1864
- Country: United States
- Allegiance: (United States) Union; Indiana
- Branch: Union Army
- Type: Infantry
- Size: Regiment
- Engagements: American Civil War; Knoxville campaign (1863); Battle of Blue Springs (1863); Battle of Walker's Ford (1863)

Commanders
- Notable commanders: George W. Jackson

The 118th Regiment Indiana Infantry was an infantry regiment from Indiana that served in the Union Army during the American Civil War. The regiment was mustered into Federal service in July and August 1863 to serve for six months. It served in the Knoxville campaign in East Tennessee, fighting in actions at Blue Springs and Walker's Ford in 1863. The regiment was mustered out at the beginning of March 1864 having lost 3 men dead from enemy action and 87 men dead from disease.

== History ==
Organized at Wabash, Ind., July and August, 1863, for 6 months' service. Left State for Nicholasville, Ky., September 16. Attached to Mahan's 1st Brigade, Wilcox's Left Wing Forces, Dept. of the Ohio, to October, 1863. 2nd Brigade, Wilcox's Left Wing Forces, Dept. of the Ohio, to January, 1864. District of the Clinch, Dept. of the Ohio, to March, 1864.

March from Nicholasville, Ky., to Cumberland Gap September 24-October 3, and to Morristown October 6–8. Action at Blue Springs October 10. March to Greenville and duty there until November 6. March across Clinch Mountain to Clinch River. Action at Walker's Ford, Clinch River, December 2. Duty at Tazewell, Maynardsville and Cumberland Gap until February, 1864. Action at Tazewell January 24. Mustered out March 1–4, 1864.

Regiment lost during service 3 Enlisted men killed and mortally wounded and 1 Officer and 86 Enlisted men by disease. Total 90.

== See also ==
- List of Indiana Civil War regiments
- Indiana in the Civil War
