= Battery M, 2nd Illinois Light Artillery Regiment =

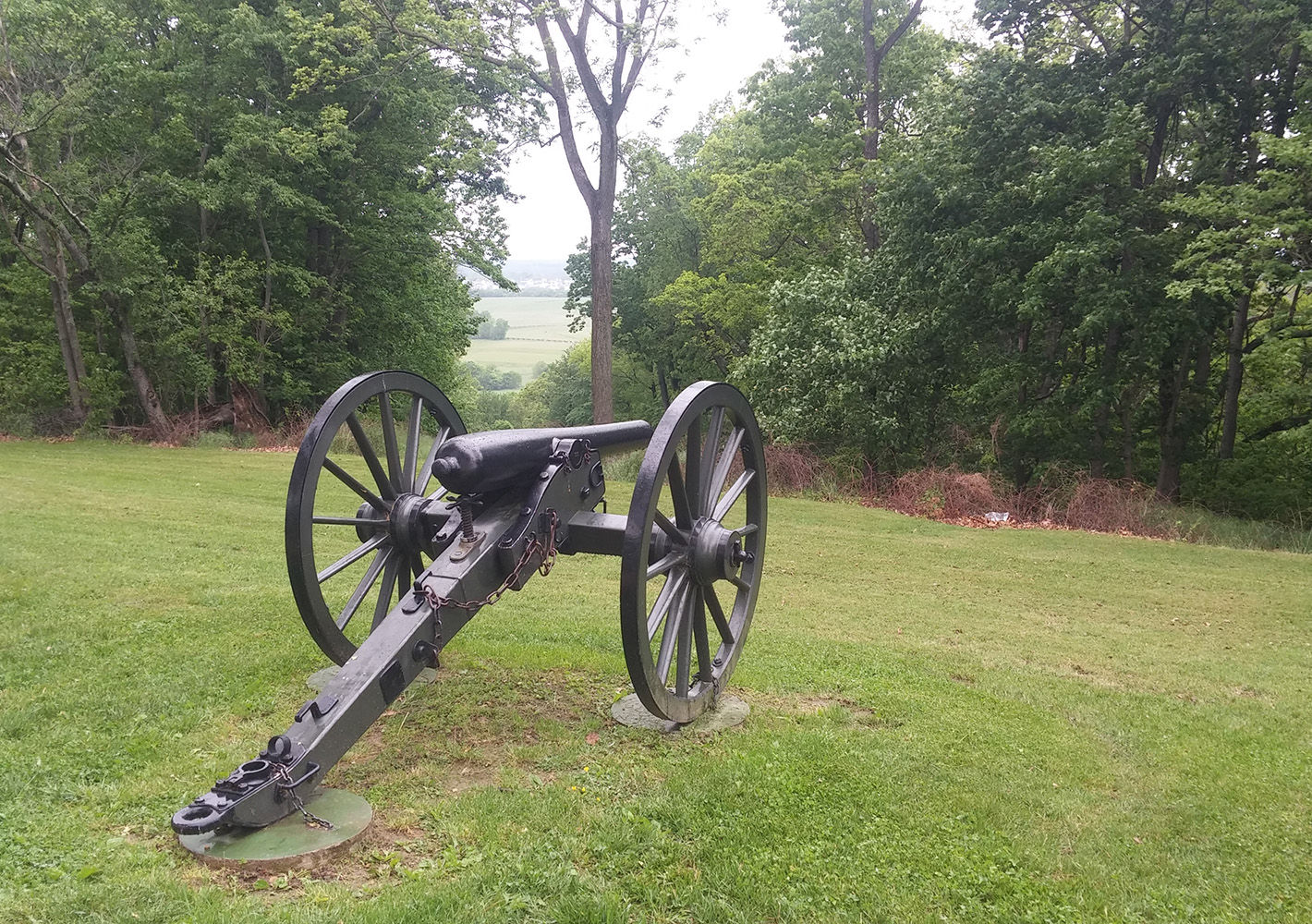
- Battery M was captured in its first action at the Battle of Harpers Ferry. The cannon is on Bolivar Heights in Harpers Ferry National Historical Park.
- Active: 6 June 1862 – 11 Apr. 1864
- Country: United States
- Allegiance: (United States) Union; Illinois
- Branch: Union Army
- Type: Field Artillery
- Size: Artillery Battery
- Engagements: American Civil War; Battle of Harpers Ferry (1862); Battle of Blountville (1863); Battle of Blue Springs (1863); Battle of Rogersville (1863); Siege of Knoxville (1863)

Commanders
- Notable commanders: John C. Phillips

Battery M, 2nd Illinois Light Artillery Regiment was an artillery battery from Illinois that served in the Union Army during the American Civil War. The battery was organized in June 1862 at Springfield, Illinois. The unit was assigned to guard the railroad in West Virginia and was captured and paroled when Harpers Ferry surrendered in September 1862. After exchange, the battery took part in the Knoxville campaign in the fall and winter of 1863. The unit was stationed in Kentucky until it was mustered out in April 1864. Personnel were transferred to Battery C and Battery H, 2nd Illinois Light Artillery Regiment.

== History ==
=== Organization ===
Organized at Chicago, Ill., and mustered on June 6, 1862. Left State for Martinsburg, W. Va., June 16, 1862, arriving there June 24. Attached to R. R. Brigade, 8th Army Corps, Middle Dept., to September, 1862. Duty at Martinsburg, W. Va., June to September. Expedition to Darkesville August 24. Moved to Harper's Ferry, W. Va., September 12. Siege of Harper's Ferry September 12–15. Surrendered September 15. Paroled September 16 and moved to Annapolis, Md., thence to Camp Douglass, Chicago, Ill., and duty there until May, 1863. Ordered to Cincinnati, Ohio, May 12, thence to Covington, Ky. To Catlettsburg, Ky., May 24. To Louisa, Ky., June 2, and duty there until August. Expedition up Big Sandy Valley to Beaver Creek June 14-July 22. Expedition to Gladesville, Va., July (Section). Moved to Covington, Ky., thence to Camp Nelson, Ky., August 4–8. Attached to 1st Brigade, 4th Division, 23rd Army Corps, Army Ohio, to August, 1863. 2nd Brigade, 3rd Division, 23rd Army Corps, to December, 1863. District of North Central Kentucky, 1st Division, 23rd Army Corps, to January, 1864. District of Southwest Kentucky, 1st Division, 23rd Army Corps, to April, 1864.

=== Service ===
Burnside's Expedition over Cumberland Mountains into East Tennessee August 17-October 17, 1863. Occupation of Knoxville, Tenn., September 2. Action at Kingsport September 18. Bristol September 19. Zollicoffer September 20–21. Hall's Ford, Watauga River, September 22. Carter's Depot and Bluntsville September 22. Blue Springs October 10. Henderson's Mills and Rheatown October 11. Blountsville October 14. Bristol October 15. At Rodgersville October 19 to November 6. Rodgersville November 6. Guns captured. Siege of Knoxville November 17-December 5. Ordered to Camp Nelson, Ky., and duty there until April, 1864. Mustered out April 11, 1864. Men transferred to Batteries C and H.

Battery lost during service 5 Enlisted men killed and mortally wounded and 16 Enlisted men by disease. Total 21.

== See also ==
- List of Illinois Civil War units
