= Horace Capron Jr. =

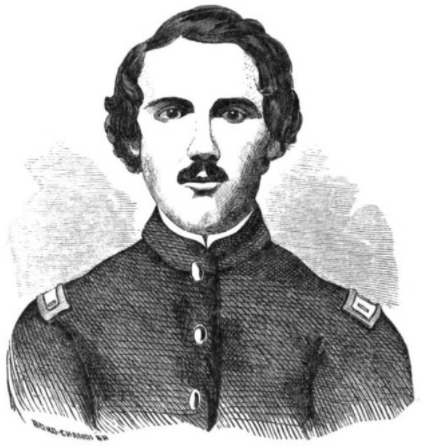
- Born: October 27, 1839; Laurel, Maryland, U.S.
- Died: February 6, 1864 (aged 24); Knoxville, Tennessee, U.S.
- Burial place: Springdale Cemetery and Mausoleum, Peoria, Illinois, U.S.
- Military career
- Allegiance: United States of America
- Branch: United States Army
- Service years: 1861–1864
- Rank: First Lieutenant
- Units: 8th Illinois Cavalry; 14th Illinois Cavalry
- Awards: Medal of Honor

Horace Capron Jr. (October 27, 1839 – February 6, 1864) was an American soldier who fought in the American Civil War. Capron received the country's highest award for bravery during combat, the Medal of Honor, for his action at Chickahominy and Ashland in Virginia in June 1862.

== Biography ==
Capron was born in Laurel, Maryland, on October 27, 1839. (Note: While his tombstone identifies his birth year as 1840, a family website cites a FamilySearch "Maryland Births and Christenings" publication that lists Capron's birth on October 27, 1839. The Martyrs and Heroes of Illinois in the Great Rebellion, 1865, also gives this date.) The 1860 U.S. census identifies him as the son of head-of-household Horace Capron in Peoria, Illinois.

He joined the 8th Illinois Cavalry at Peoria as a corporal in September 1861, and was promoted to sergeant in 1862. He was later commissioned as a first lieutenant of the 14th Illinois Cavalry, his father's regiment. Capron's horse was killed during a skirmish in September 1863 near Kingsport, Tennessee.

Capron was mortally wounded on February 2, 1864, during a charge near Qualla Town, North Carolina. He died from his wounds on February 6, 1864, in Knoxville, Tennessee, where he had been transported. His remains are interred at the Springdale Cemetery and Mausoleum in Peoria. He was posthumously awarded the Medal of Honor on September 27, 1865.

== Medal of Honor citation ==
Gallantry in action.

== See also ==
- List of American Civil War Medal of Honor recipients: A–F
