= 10th Indiana Infantry Regiment =

10th Regiment Indiana Infantry
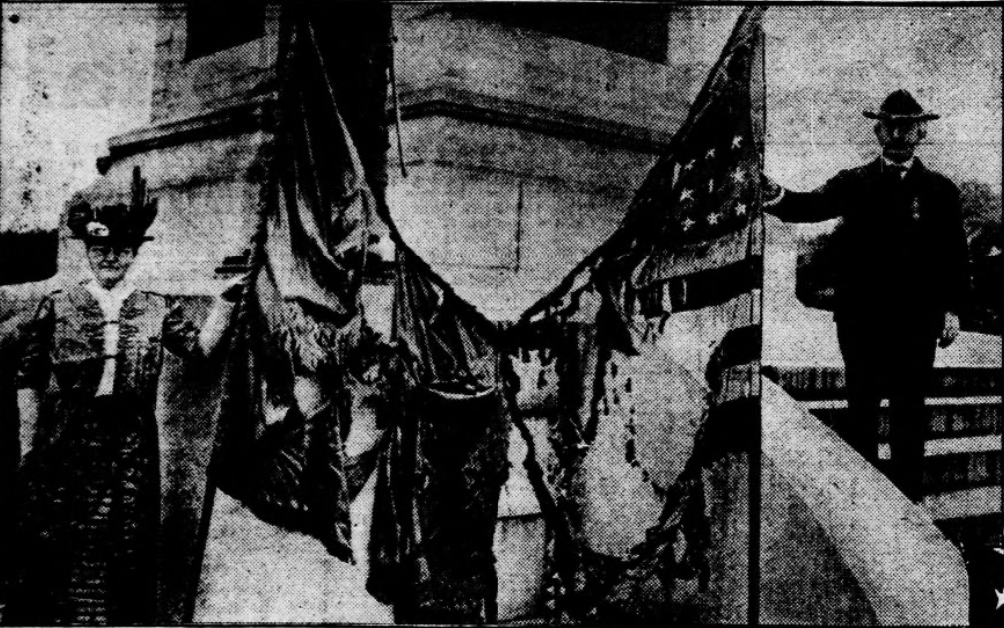
- Regimental colors
- Active: April 22 – August 2, 1861 (3 months); September 18, 1861 – September 19, 1864 (3 years)
- Country: United States
- Allegiance: Union
- Branch: Infantry
- Engagements: Battle of Rich Mountain; Battle of Mill Springs; Siege of Corinth; Battle of Perryville; Tullahoma Campaign; Battle of Chickamauga; Siege of Chattanooga; Battle of Missionary Ridge; Atlanta campaign; Battle of Resaca; Battle of Kennesaw Mountain; Siege of Atlanta; Battle of Jonesborough

The 10th Regiment Indiana Infantry was an infantry regiment in the Union Army during the American Civil War.

== Service ==
=== Three-months regiment ===
The 10th Indiana Infantry organized at Indianapolis, Indiana April 22–25, 1861 in response to President Lincoln's call for 75,000 volunteers. The regiment performed duty near Evansville, Indiana, until June 7. It was then ordered to western Virginia June 7 and attached to Rosecrans' Brigade, McClellan's Army of West Virginia where it occupied Buckhannon on June 30. The 10th Indiana Infantry participated in the Western Virginia Campaign, July 6–17 and fought at the Battle of Rich Mountain on July 11. The men remained on duty at Beverly until July 24 and were mustered out of service on August 2, 1861.

During the three-month service the regiment lost at total of 6 men; 4 enlisted men killed or mortally wounded and 2 enlisted men by disease.

=== Three-years regiment ===
The 10th Indiana Infantry was reorganized at Indianapolis and mustered in for three years service on September 18, 1861.

The regiment was attached to Thomas' Command, Army of the Ohio, October–November 1861. 2nd Brigade, Army of the Ohio, to December 1861. 2nd Brigade, 1st Division, Army of the Ohio, to September 1862. 2nd Brigade, 1st Division, III Corps, Army of the Ohio, to November 1862. 2nd Brigade, 3rd Division, Center, XIV Corps, Army of the Cumberland, to January 1863. 2nd Brigade, 3rd Division, XIV Corps, Army of the Cumberland, to October 1863. 3rd Brigade, 3rd Division, XIV Corps, to December 1863. Garrison duty, Chattanooga, Tennessee, Department of the Cumberland, to April 1864. 3rd Brigade, 3rd Division, XIV Corps, to September 1864.

The 10th Indiana Infantry mustered out of service on September 19, 1864. Veterans and recruits were transferred to the 58th Indiana Infantry.

== Detailed service ==
Ordered to Louisville, Kentucky, September 22. At Bardstown, Kentucky, October and November 1861. Advance on Camp Hamilton, Kentucky, January 1–15, 1862. Battle of Mill Springs January 19. Mill Springs January 19–20. Moved to Louisville, Kentucky, then to Nashville, Tennessee, February 11-March 2. March to Savannah, Tennessee, March 20-April 7. Expedition to Bear Creek, Alabama, April 12–13. Advance on and siege of Corinth, Mississippi, April 29-May 30. Pursuit to Booneville May 30-June 12. March to Iuka, Mississippi, then to Tuscombia, Alabama, and duty there until August. March to Louisville, Kentucky, in pursuit of Bragg August 20-September 26. Pursuit of Bragg Into Kentucky October 1–15. Battle of Perryville, October 8. March to Gallatin, Tennessee, and duty there until January 13, 1863. Operations against Morgan December 22, 1862 to January 2, 1863. Boston December 29, 1862. Action at Rolling Fork December 30. Moved to Nashville, Tennessee, January 13, 1863; then to Murfreesboro, Tennessee, and duty there until June. Expedition toward Columbia March 4–14. Tullahoma Campaign June 23-July 7. Hoover's Gap June 24–26. Tullahoma June 29–30. Occupation of middle Tennessee until August 16. Passage of the Cumberland Mountains and Tennessee River and Chickamauga Campaign August 16-September 22. Battle of Chickamauga September 19–21. Siege of Chattanooga, September 24-November 23. Chattanooga-Ringgold Campaign November 23–27. Orchard Knob November 23–24. Missionary Ridge November 25. Demonstration on Dalton, Georgia, February 22–27, 1864. Tunnel Hill, Buzzard's Roost Gap and Rocky Faced Ridge February 23–25. Atlanta Campaign May 1 to September 8. Demonstrations on Rocky Faced Ridge May 8–11. Battle of Resaca May 14–15. Advance on Dallas May 18–25. Operations on line of Pumpkin Vine Creek and battles about Dallas, New Hope Church, and Allatoona Hills May 25-June 5. Operations about Marietta and against Kennesaw Mountain June 10-July 2. Pine Hill June 11–14. Lost Mountain June 15–17. Assault on Kennesaw June 27. Ruff's Station July 4. Vining Station July 4–5. Chattahoochee River July 5–17. Peachtree Creek July 19–20. Siege of Atlanta July 22-August 25. Utoy Creek August 5–7. Flank movement on Jonesboro August 25–30. Battle of Jonesboro August 31-September 1.

== Casualties ==
The regiment lost a total of 186 men during service; 3 officers and 64 enlisted men killed or mortally wounded, 5 officers and 114 enlisted men died of disease.

== Commanders ==
- Colonel Mahlon Dickerson Manson - promoted to brigadier general, March 24, 1862
- Colonel William C. Kise - discharged for health reasons, November 17, 1862 (later colonel of the 116th Regiment, Indiana Volunteer Infantry)
- Colonel William B. Carroll - killed at the Battle of Chickamauga, September 20, 1863
- Colonel Marsh B. Taylor - mustered out with regiment, September 20, 1864 (later colonel of the 150th Regiment, Indiana Volunteer Infantry)

== See also ==
- List of Indiana Civil War regiments
- Indiana in the Civil War

== Notes/References/Sources ==
Notes

Sources

- Dyer, Frederick Henry (1908). A Compendium of the War of the Rebellion (PDF). Des Moines, IA: Dyer Pub. Co. pp. 1121–1122. ASIN B01BUFJ76Q. This article incorporates text from this source, which is in the public domain.
- Federal Publishing Company (1908). Military Affairs and Regimental Histories of New Jersey, Indiana, Illinois and Michigan (PDF). The Union Army: A History of Military Affairs in the Loyal States, 1861–65 – Records of the Regiments in the Union army – Cyclopedia of battles – Memoirs of Commanders and Soldiers. Vol. III. Madison, WI: Federal Publishing Company. pp. 113–114. OCLC 694018100. This article incorporates text from this source, which is in the public domain.
- Shaw, James Birney (1912). History of the Tenth regiment Indiana volunteer infantry three months and three years organizations. Lafayette, IN: [Burt-Haywood Co.]. This article incorporates text from this source, which is in the public domain.
- Terrell, William Henry Harrison (1865). Report of the Adjutant General of the State of Indiana (pdf). Indiana Adjutant General Reports. Vol. II. Indianapolis, IN: A.H. Connor State Printer. pp. 67–74. OCLC 558004259. This article incorporates text from this source, which is in the public domain.
- "Indiana Battle Flag Inventory". Indiana War Memorial. May 4, 2021.

Further reading

- Hickerson, James L., The Memoranda of James L. Hickerson, I Company, 10th Indiana Volunteer Infantry, Aug. 1861-Sept. 1864, ed. James T. Thompson (Albuquerque, N. M.: The editor,

1993).
