= Battery K, 1st Illinois Light Artillery Regiment =

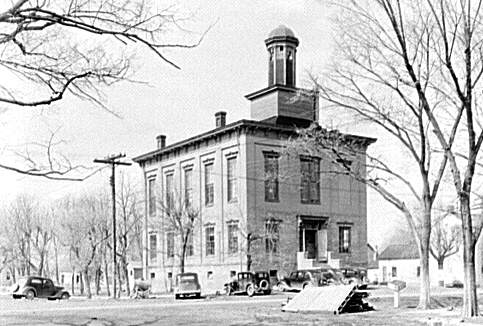
- Battery K formed at Shawneetown, Illinois. The 1857 Shawneetown Court House (shown) was razed when the town relocated after the Great Flood of 1937.
- Active: 9 Jan. 1862 – 10 Dec. 1864
- Country: United States
- Allegiance: (United States) Union; Illinois
- Branch: Union Army
- Type: Field Artillery
- Size: Artillery Battery
- Equipment: 2-pounder Woodruff gun
- Engagements: American Civil War; Grierson's Raid (1863); Battle of Plains Store (1863); Siege of Port Hudson (1863); Battle of Okolona (1864); Battle of Tupelo (1864); Battle of Spring Hill (1864); Battle of Franklin (1864)

Commanders
- Notable commanders: Jason B. Smith

Battery K, 1st Illinois Light Artillery Regiment was an artillery battery from Illinois that served in the Union Army during the American Civil War. The battery was organized in January 1862 at Shawneetown and spent most of 1862–1863 on guard duty in western Kentucky. Part of the battery participated in Grierson's Raid and the Siege of Port Hudson in 1863. The battery fought at Okolona, Tupelo, Spring Hill, and Franklin in 1864. The battery mustered out of Federal service in December 1864; new recruits and re-enlisted veterans transferred to Battery E, 1st Illinois Light Artillery Regiment.

== Personnel ==
Battery K, 1st Illinois Light Artillery formed at Shawneetown, Illinois (now Old Shawneetown) and mustered into Federal service on 9 January 1862. The original officers were Captain Angrean Franklin of Vienna, Illinois, First Lieutenants Jason B. Smith and Joseph P. Shelton, both of Vienna, and Second Lieutenants William O. Stephenson of Vienna and James G. Helm of Metropolis. Franklin resigned on 31 March 1862 and was replaced as captain by Smith on 1 April 1862. First Sergeant Isaac W. Curtis of Metropolis was also promoted first lieutenant on that date. Other personnel were four sergeants, eight corporals, Quartermaster Joseph W. Franklin, Bugler Jasper N. Cross, Farrier William L. Marberey, and Blacksmith Ambrose H. Smith, and Wagoner George Clark. There were 74 men enrolled as private.

Battery K was part of the 1st Illinois Light Artillery Regiment which organized at Chicago, Springfield, Ottawa, and Cairo, Illinois. There were 12 batteries named A–M, not including J. The different batteries belonging to the regiment formed between 16 July 1861 (A and B) and 12 August 1862 (M), and enlisted for three years' service. Each battery served independently of the others. The regiment's original commander was Colonel Joseph Dana Webster.

Captain Smith resigned on 11 September 1864. First Lieutenant Shelton died on 13 December 1862. Second Lieutenant Stephenson resigned on 20 March 1863. Curtis was promoted captain on 11 September 1864 and mustered out when the battery consolidated with Battery E on 14 February 1865. Almost all the original soldiers were from Vienna, Metropolis, and Golconda, Illinois, though four were from Marion, Kentucky and one from Shawneetown. Re-enlisting as veterans on 20 March 1864 were 22 privates. Beginning in July 1862, 57 men were recruited into the battery. At consolidation, the veterans and recruits transferred to Battery E, 1st Illinois Light Artillery.

== History ==
=== Grierson's Raid ===
Battery K was ordered to move to Cairo in March 1862. The unit was attached to the District of Columbus, Kentucky in March–November 1862. The battery remained in Cairo, Paducah, Kentucky, or within the District of Columbus until November 1862, and part of the unit continued serving there through October 1863. The battery was attached to XIII Corps in November–December 1862 and to XVI Corps in December 1862–March 1863. The unit was assigned to 6th Division, XVI Corps in March–October 1863. Battery K was assigned to 3rd Brigade, 1st Cavalry Division, XVI Corps in October–November 1863.

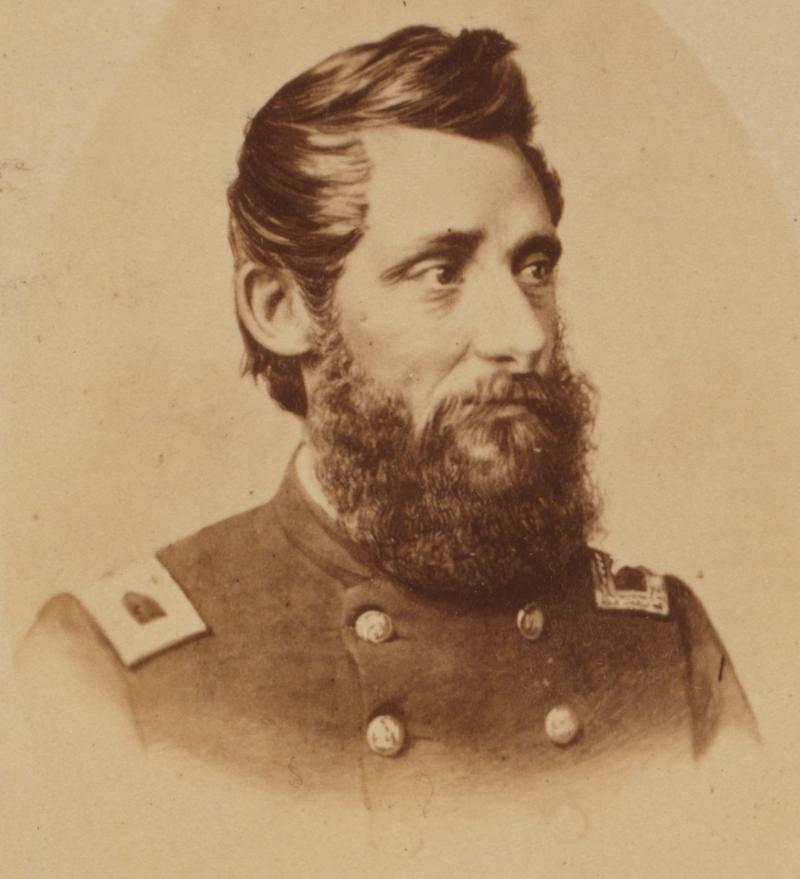
Benjamin Grierson

One section of Battery K was detached to Benjamin Grierson's Cavalry Brigade, XIII Corps, Army of the Tennessee in November 1862–March 1863. Evidently, this section performed the most active service during 1863. The section took part in Ulysses S. Grant's Central Mississippi campaign in November 1862–January 1863. The unit participated in a reconnaissance from La Grange to Collierville, Tennessee on 5 November 1862. The section was in action at Ripley, Mississippi on 23 December and Bolivar, Tennessee on 24 December. The section was assigned to 1st Brigade, 1st Cavalry Division, XVI Corps in March–May 1863. While being stationed at Lagrange and Memphis, Tennessee until April 1863, the section went on an expedition from Lagrange on 8–13 March, including skirmishes at Covington, Tennessee on 9–10 March.

From 17 April to 2 May 1863, the detached section took part in Grierson's Raid from La Grange to Baton Rouge, Louisiana. The 1,700 raiders consisted of the 6th Illinois, and 7th Illinois, and 2nd Iowa Cavalry Regiments, plus a detachment of six 2-pounder Woodruff guns from Captain Jason B. Smith's Battery K, 1st Illinois Artillery. On 20 April, Grierson sent back 175 of his least fit cavalrymen to confuse his Confederate pursuers. The raiders reached Okolona, Mississippi on 21–22 April, Garlandville on 24 April, Union Church on 28 April, Brookhaven on 29 April, Wall's Post Office, Louisiana on 1 May, and the Comite River on 2 May. The Woodruff guns contributed to the raid's success. One source stated that the Union cavalry units which took part in Grierson's Raid were supported by either four or six Woodruff guns. Colonel Edward Hatch of the 2nd Iowa Cavalry called the guns 2-pounders.

After the raid, Battery K's detached section joined the Cavalry Brigade, XIX Corps, Department of the Gulf through July 1863. The section fought in the Battle of Plains Store on 21 May 1863 and participated in the Siege of Port Hudson from 24 May to 9 July. During the siege, the section was in action at Clinton, Louisiana on 3–4 June and Jackson Cross Roads on 20 June. After the siege, the section traveled to Memphis on 18–28 July where it rejoined the remainder of Battery K.

=== Okolona to Franklin ===
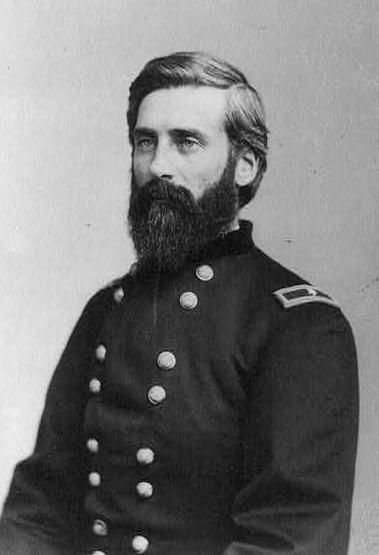
Edward Hatch

The full Battery K was assigned to 3rd Brigade, 1st Cavalry Division, XVI Corps in July–November 1863. The unit was stationed at Germantown, Tennessee until November. On 4–17 October, the battery participated in operations against Confederates under James Ronald Chalmers in north Mississippi and west Tennessee. The unit scouted from Germantown to Tullahoma on 22–24 October. Battery K was assigned to 2nd Brigade, 1st Cavalry Division, 16th Army Corps From November 1863 to June 1864. It took part in operations on the Memphis and Charleston Railroad on 3–5 November, including at Moscow, Tennessee. and again on 28 November–10 December against Confederates under Stephen D. Lee. In the latter operation, there was clash at Saulsbury, Tennessee on 3 December. The battery was involved in a skirmish at Collierville on 27–28 December 1863.

The battery participated in William Sooy Smith's cavalry expedition from Collierville to Okolona and West Point, Mississippi on 11–26 February 1864. At West Point, though confronted by a very inferior force under Nathan Bedford Forrest, W. S. Smith ordered his 7,000 cavalry and 20 guns to begin a retreat on 21 February. In the Battle of Okolona on 22 February, a brigade of Federal cavalry panicked and galloped away, causing five guns to be abandoned. W. S. Smith's report stated that the fleeing cavalry, "drove a battery of little pop-guns off into a ditch, where it was so badly smashed up that we could not get it along". He asserted that the guns were spiked, the ammunition was destroyed, and the horses were saved. W. S. Smith noted that it was Perkins' battery of six M1841 mountain howitzers, and not Battery K. Forrest reported having no more than 2,500 Confederate cavalry. Colonel George E. Waring Jr., who commanded one of the Federal brigades reported that the, "expedition filled every man connected with it with burning shame". Smith reported 388 casualties.

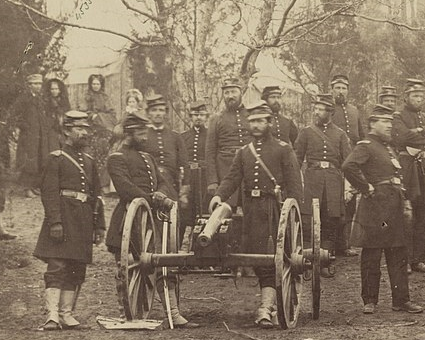
Small caliber gun similar in size to the 2-pounder Woodruff gun

Battery K was assigned to 2nd Brigade, 1st Cavalry Division, District of West Tennessee in June–November 1864. The unit performed garrison duty at Germantown and Memphis until July. The battery took part in Andrew Jackson Smith's expedition to Tupelo, Mississippi on 5–21 July, including the Battle of Tupelo on 14–15 July 1864. By deft marching, A. J. Smith's 14,000 soldiers and 24 guns occupied Tupelo and took up a defensive position. On 14 July, S. D. Lee and Forrest attacked A. J. Smith's positions with 9,000 men and 20 guns, but were repulsed. The Federals sustained 714 casualties while inflicting losses of 1,326 killed and wounded on the Confederates. On 15 July, the Federal column began a withdrawal to Memphis while repelling several Confederate attacks during the day. Battery K accompanied a second A. J. Smith expedition to Oxford, Mississippi on 1–30 August. There were minor actions at the Tallahatchie River on 7–9 August, Oxford on 9 August, and Hurricane Creek on 13–14 and 19 August. The battery participated in operations in middle Tennessee and north Alabama on 30 September–1 November.

Battery K was attached to 2nd Brigade, 5th Division, Cavalry Corps, Military Division Mississippi, in November–December 1864. The battery was assigned to Datus E. Coon's 2nd Brigade, Edward Hatch's 5th Division, and James H. Wilson's Cavalry Corps. The unit took part in the Franklin–Nashville Campaign in north Alabama and middle Tennessee on 1 November–10 December. Hatch's division was originally intended to accompany Sherman's March to the Sea, but George H. Thomas withheld it to provide a cavalry screen between his army and John Bell Hood's Confederate army. Hatch's division arrived near the Tennessee River on 6 November to observe Hood's army. Battery K was near Shoal Creek on 11 November and again on 16–20 November. On 21 November, Hatch reported Hood had 10,000 cavalry and 30,000–35,000 infantry advancing toward Lawrenceburg, Tennessee, a fairly accurate assessment.

By 22 November 1864, Battery K was at Lawrenceburg and on 24 November it was at Campbellsville. In a skirmish at Campbellsville, Hatch's cavalry was beaten, but they diverted their foes away from John Schofield's two corps, which were retreating toward Columbia. In the event, Schofield's infantry got to Columbia before Hood's cavalry reached it. On 29 November, Forrest outmaneuvered Wilson's Union cavalry then turned west to cut Schofield's line of retreat. By 10:00 pm that evening 19,000 Confederate infantry faced only 6,000 Federals in the Battle of Spring Hill. After an astonishing communications breakdown in Hood's army, Schofield's army escaped the trap. At the Battle of Franklin on 30 November, Hatch's 2,800-man division defeated William Hicks Jackson's 2,500-man cavalry division at Hughes Ford and compelled it to abandon its bridgehead on the north bank of the Duck River. The soldiers of Battery K were mustered out of service on 10 December 1864. Veterans and recruits transferred to Battery "E," 1st Illinois Light Artillery. The battery lost 11 Enlisted men by disease while in service.

=== Reorganized Battery K ===
Colvin's Battery Illinois Light Artillery was renamed Battery K, 1st Illinois Light Artillery Regiment in March 1865. The battery was attached to 2nd Brigade, 4th Division, Department of East Tennessee. The unit garrisoned Cumberland Gap and other places in East Tennessee. The battery was mustered out of Federal service on 15 July 1865.

== See also ==
- List of Illinois Civil War units
