= 117th Indiana Infantry Regiment =

117th Regiment Indiana Infantry
- Active: Sept. 17, 1863 – Feb. 27, 1864
- Country: United States
- Allegiance: (United States) Union; Indiana
- Branch: Union Army
- Type: Infantry
- Size: Regiment
- Engagements: American Civil War; Knoxville campaign (1863); Battle of Blue Springs (1863); Battle of Bean's Station (1863)

Commanders
- Notable commanders: Thomas J. Brady

The 117th Regiment Indiana Infantry was an infantry regiment from Indiana that served in the Union Army during the American Civil War. The regiment was mustered into Federal service in September 1863 to serve for six months. It served in the Knoxville campaign in East Tennessee, fighting in actions at Blue Springs and Bean's Station in 1863. The regiment was mustered out at the end of February 1864 having lost no men in action and 95 men dead from disease.

== History ==
Organized at Indianapolis, Indiana, and mustered in for 6 months' service September 17, 1863. Left State for Nicholasville, Kentucky, September 17. Attached to John R. Mahan's 1st Brigade, Wilcox's Left Wing Forces, Dept. of the Ohio, to December, 1863. 1st Brigade, 3rd Division, 23rd Army Corps, to January, 1864. District of the Clinch, Dept. of the Ohio, to February, 1864.

March from Nicholasville to Cumberland Gap on September 24–October 3, 1863; thence to Morristown, Tennessee, on October 6–8. Battle of Blue Springs on October 10. March to Greenville and duty there until November 6. Moved to Bean's Station on November 6. Battle of Bean's Station (also known as Action at Clinch Mountain Gap) on November 14. Duty at Tazewell, Maynardville, and Cumberland Gap until February 1864. Action at Tazewell January 24, 1864. Mustered out February 23–27, 1864.

Regiment lost during service 95 enlisted men by disease. Total 95.

== See also ==
- List of Indiana Civil War regiments
- Indiana in the Civil War
