= Silas Colgrove =

Union Army officer during the American Civil War

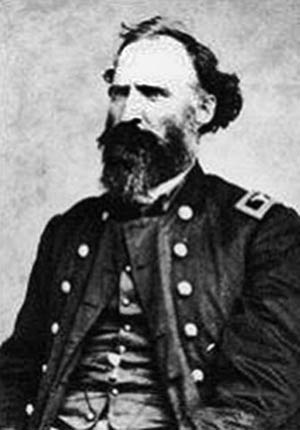
- Born: May 24, 1816; Woodhull, New York, U.S.
- Died: January 13, 1907 (aged 90) Kerr City, Florida, U.S.
- Buried: Cremated; ashes scattered over Lake Kerr
- Allegiance: United States
- Branch: Union Army
- Service years: 1861–1864
- Rank: Colonel brevet Brigadier General
- Commands: 8th Indiana Infantry Regiment; 27th Indiana Infantry Regiment
- Conflicts: Battle of Rich Mountain; Shenandoah Valley Campaign; Battle of Front Royal; First Battle of Winchester; Battle of Cedar Mountain; Battle of Antietam; Battle of Chancellorsville; Battle of Gettysburg; Atlanta campaign Battle of Resaca; Battle of Peachtree Creek

Silas Colgrove (May 24, 1816 – January 13, 1907) was an American lawyer, judge, and Union Army officer during the American Civil War. He commanded the 27th Indiana Infantry Regiment through significant battles in both the Eastern and Western Theaters, earning a brevet promotion to brigadier general for his distinguished service.

== Early life ==
Colgrove was born in Woodhull, New York, on May 24, 1816. He later moved to Winchester, Indiana, where he worked as a lawyer and served as prosecuting attorney. From 1856 until 1861, he represented Randolph County in the Indiana House of Representatives.

== Civil War service ==
At the outbreak of the Civil War, Colgrove was commissioned lieutenant colonel of the 8th Indiana Infantry Regiment and participated in the Western Virginia campaign, including the Battle of Rich Mountain, which helped secure the region for the Union.

In September 1861, he was promoted to colonel and given command of the newly formed 27th Indiana Infantry Regiment. Under his leadership, the regiment gained a reputation for discipline and resilience.

Colgrove led his regiment through the Shenandoah Valley Campaign of 1862, engaging in combat at Battle of Front Royal and the First Battle of Winchester. The regiment played a key role in holding defensive positions and delaying Confederate advances during this critical campaign.

At the Battle of Cedar Mountain in August 1862, Colgrove and the 27th Indiana fought valiantly under heavy enemy assault, helping to blunt Confederate attacks. Shortly thereafter, at the Battle of Antietam, the regiment suffered nearly 50% casualties while holding their position in Miller's Cornfield amid some of the war's fiercest fighting.

In May 1863, Colgrove was wounded at the Battle of Chancellorsville during intense fighting as Union forces faced a surprise Confederate flank attack. Despite his injuries, he returned to lead the regiment at the Battle of Gettysburg, where the 27th Indiana was engaged in the brutal fight for Culp's Hill. Colgrove was again wounded but remained with his men on the front lines.

Later in 1864, the regiment transferred west to participate in the Atlanta campaign. Colgrove led his men in the Battle of Resaca and the Battle of Peachtree Creek, where he sustained serious wounds. Recognized for his meritorious service, he was brevetted brigadier general in July 1864. Due to lingering effects of his injuries, Colgrove resigned from active service on December 30, 1864.

== Post-war career ==
After the war, Colgrove was elected Circuit Court judge for Randolph and Delaware Counties in Indiana, serving multiple terms. He also served as president of the Cincinnati, Fort Wayne & Grand Rapids Railroad. In 1888, he moved to Washington, D.C., where he worked at the Bureau of Pensions until retiring in 1893 due to ill health.

== Death ==
Silas Colgrove died on January 13, 1907, in Kerr City, Florida. He was cremated, and his ashes were scattered over Lake Kerr.
