= 116th Indiana Infantry Regiment =

116th Regiment Indiana Infantry
- Active: August 17, 1863 – March 2, 1864
- Country: United States
- Allegiance: (United States) Union; Indiana
- Branch: Union Army
- Type: Infantry
- Size: Regiment
- Engagements: American Civil War; Knoxville campaign (1863); Battle of Blue Springs (1863); Battle of Walker's Ford (1863)

Commanders
- Notable commanders: William C. Kise

The 116th Regiment Indiana Infantry was an infantry regiment from Indiana that served in the Union Army during the American Civil War. The regiment was mustered into Federal service in August 1863 to serve for six months. It served in the Knoxville campaign in East Tennessee, fighting in actions at Blue Springs and Walker's Ford in 1863. The regiment was mustered out in March 1864 having lost 1 man dead from enemy action and 64 men dead from disease.

== Service ==
The 116th Indiana Infantry was organized at Lafayette, Indiana for a six-month enlistment and mustered in on August 17, 1863, under the command of Colonel William C. Kise.

The regiment was attached to Mahan's 1st Brigade, Wilcox's Left Wing Forces, Department of the Ohio, to October 1863. 2nd Brigade, Wilcox's Division, Left Wing Forces, Department of the Ohio, to January 1864. District of the Clinch, Department of the Ohio, to February 1864.

The 116th Indiana Infantry mustered out of service February 29 to March 2, 1864.

== Detailed service ==
Moved to Dearborn, Michigan, August 31, and guarded the arsenal there until September 16. Moved to Nicholasville, Kentucky, September 16. Marched from Nicholasville, to Cumberland Gap September 24-October 3, 1863, and to Morristown October 6–8. Action at Blue Springs October 10. Marched to Greenville and duty there until November 6; then marched to Bull's Gap and across Clinch Mountain to Clinch River November–December. Action at Walker's Ford, Clinch River, December 2. Duty at Tazewell, Maynardsville, and in eastern Tennessee until February 1864. Action at Tazewell January 24.

== Casualties ==
The regiment lost a total of 65 men during service; 1 enlisted men killed, 64 enlisted men died of disease.

== Commanders ==
- Colonel William C. Kise

== See also ==
- List of Indiana Civil War regiments
- Indiana in the Civil War
