= Colvin's Battery Illinois Light Artillery =

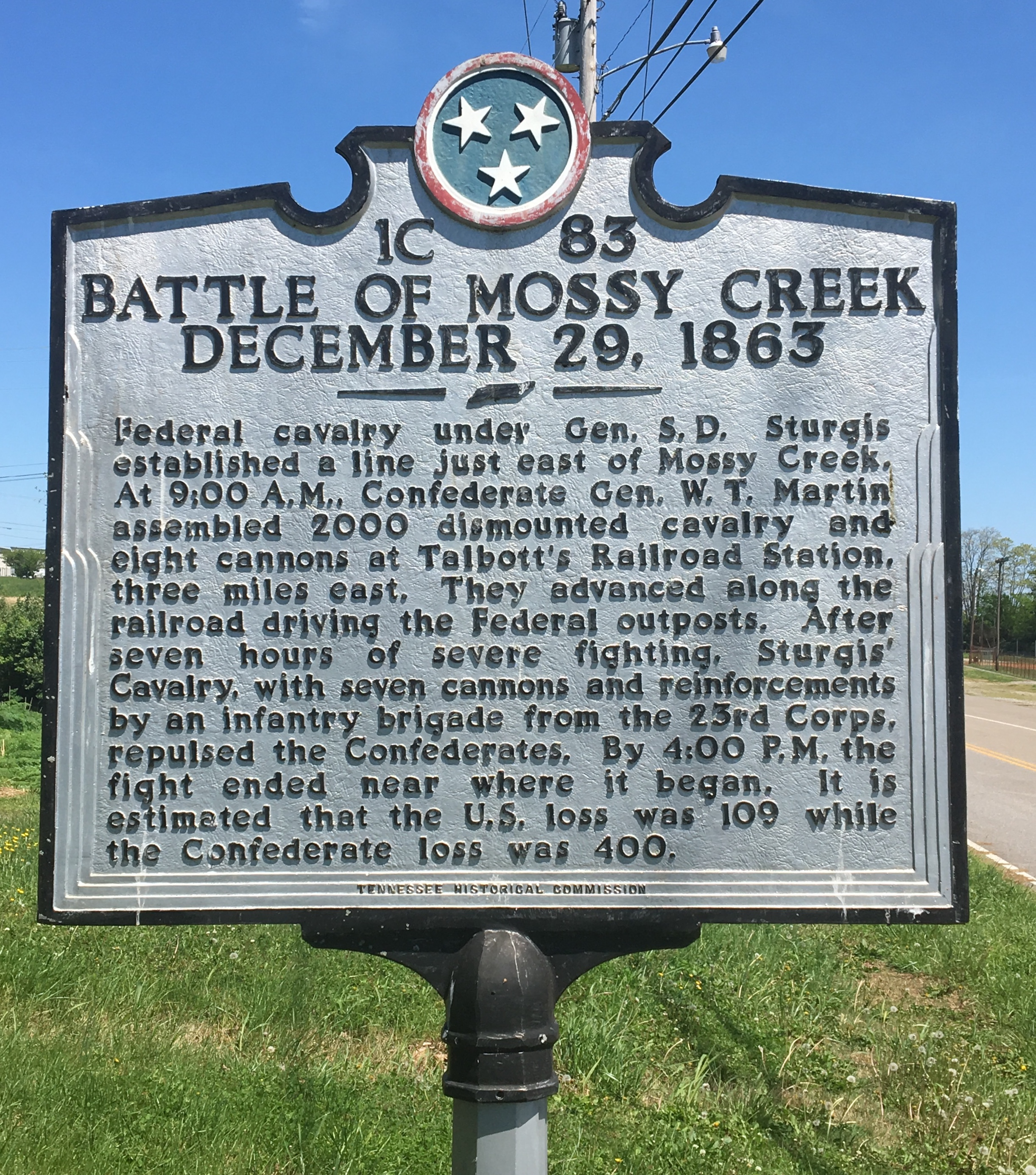
- Colvin's Battery was engaged at Mossy Creek.
- Active: 6 Oct. 1863 – 23 Mar. 1865
- Country: United States
- Allegiance: (United States) Union; Illinois
- Branch: Union Army
- Type: Field Artillery
- Size: Artillery Battery
- Engagements: American Civil War; Knoxville campaign (1863); Battle of Walker's Ford (1863); Battle of Mossy Creek (1863); Battle of Dandridge (1864); Wheeler's East Tennessee Raid (1864)

Commanders
- Notable commanders: John H. Colvin

Colvin's Battery Illinois Light Artillery was an artillery battery from Illinois that served in the Union Army during the American Civil War. The battery was organized in October 1863 and served in the Knoxville campaign. The battery campaigned in eastern Tennessee in January 1864 then garrisoned Knoxville for over a year. In March 1865, the unit was re-designed Battery K, 1st Illinois Light Artillery Regiment.

== History ==
=== Organization ===
Colvin's Battery was organized on October 6, 1863 from men detached from the 107th Illinois Infantry Regiment, 33rd Kentucky Infantry Regiment, and 22nd Indiana Battery. It was attached to 4th Brigade, 4th Division, XXIII Corps, Department of the Ohio, in October–November 1863. The battery transferred to 2nd Division, Cavalry Corps, Department of the Ohio from November 1863 to April 1864. Thereafter, the battery belonged to 2nd Brigade, 4th Division, XXIII Corps to February 1865. Finally, the unit was assigned to 2nd Brigade, 4th Division, District of East Tennessee, Army of the Cumberland in March–April 1865.

=== Service ===
Knoxville Campaign November 4-December 23, 1863. Near Maynardsville December 1. Walker's Ford December 2. Mossy Creek, Talbot Station, December 29. Operations about Dandridge January 16–17, 1864. Kimbrough's Cross Roads January 16. Dandridge January 17. Operations about Dandridge January 26–28. Near Fair Garden January 27. Garrison duty at Knoxville, Tenn., until March, 1865. Operations against Wheeler's Raid in East Tennessee August 15–25, 1864. Strawberry Plains August 24. Battery transferred to 1st Illinois Light Artillery as Battery "K" March 23, 1865.

Battery lost during service 14 by disease.

== See also ==
- List of Illinois Civil War units
