= 25th Virginia Cavalry Regiment =

- Flag of Virginia, 1861
- Active: July 1864 – April 1865
- Disbanded: April 1865
- Country: Confederacy
- Allegiance: Confederate States of America
- Branch: Confederate States Army
- Type: Cavalry
- Engagements: American Civil War: Valley Campaigns of 1864

The 25th Virginia Cavalry Regiment was a cavalry regiment raised in Virginia for service in the Confederate States Army during the American Civil War. It fought mostly in western Virginia and the Shenandoah Valley.

Virginia's 25th Cavalry Regiment was organized in July, 1864, using the 27th Battalion Virginia Partisan Rangers as its nucleus. Serving in McCausland's and Imboden's Brigade, the unit fought in numerous engagements in western Virginia and the Shenandoah Valley. During April, 1865, it disbanded. Its commanders were Colonel Warren M. Hopkins, Lieutenant Colonel Henry A. Edmundson, and Major Sylvester R. McConnell.

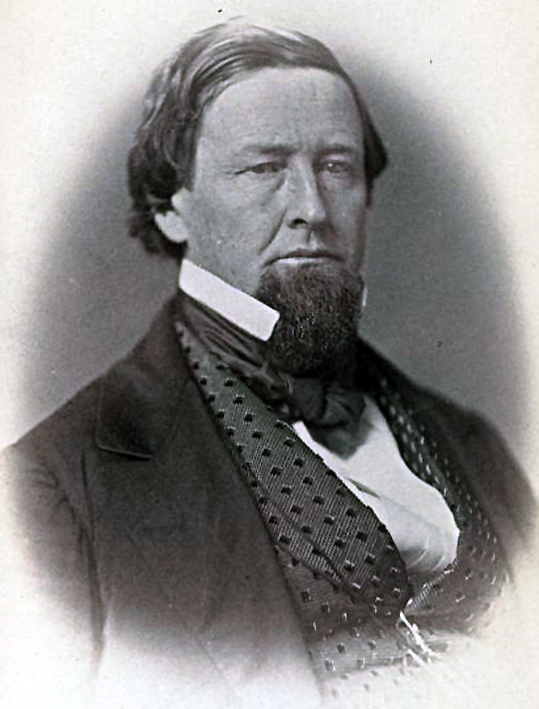
Lt Col. Henry A Edmundson

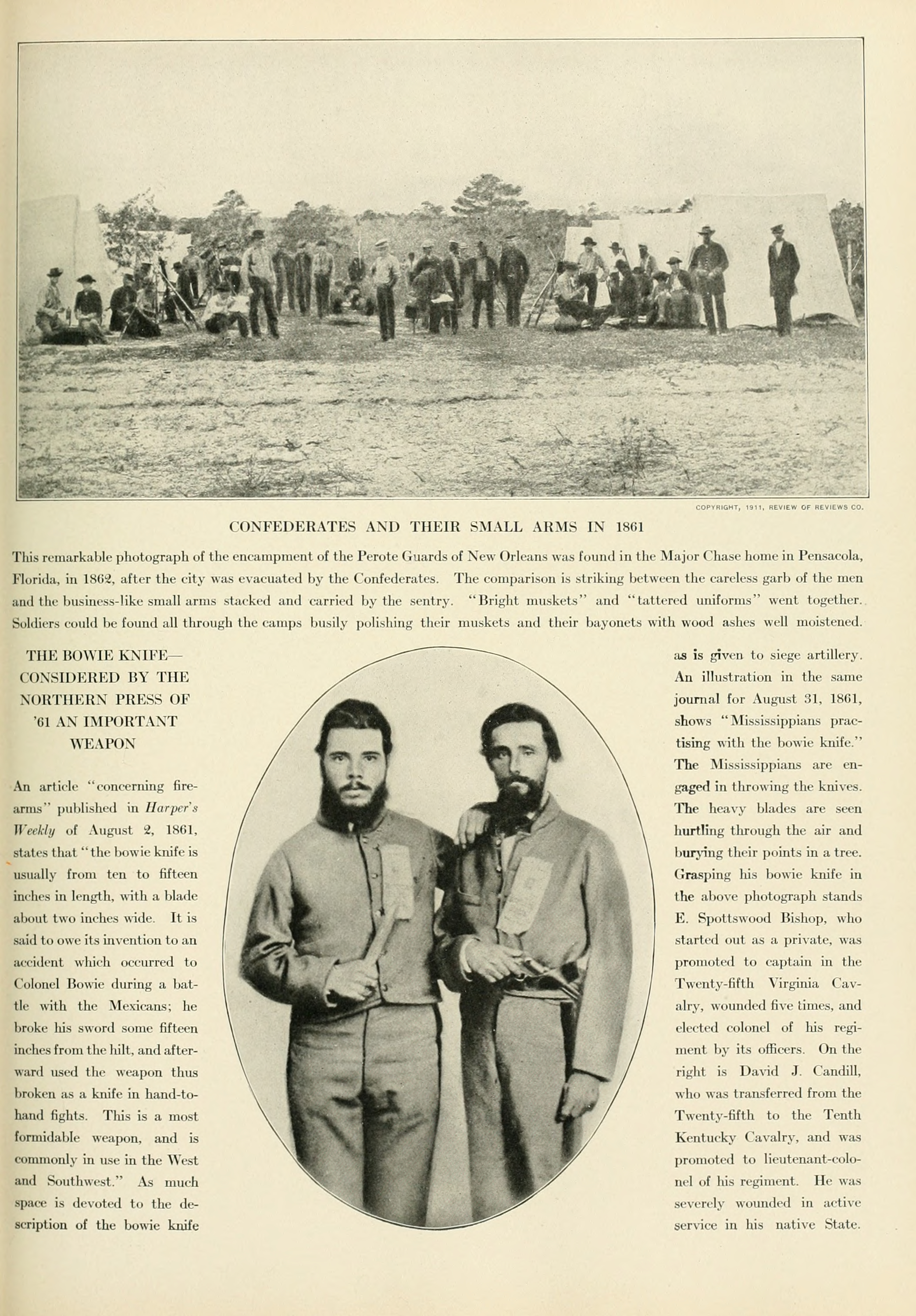
Two members of the 25th Va Cavalry: left Captain E. Spootswood Bishop; right Daniel Caudill served with the 25th Virgnina Cavalry and the 10th Kentucky Cavalry

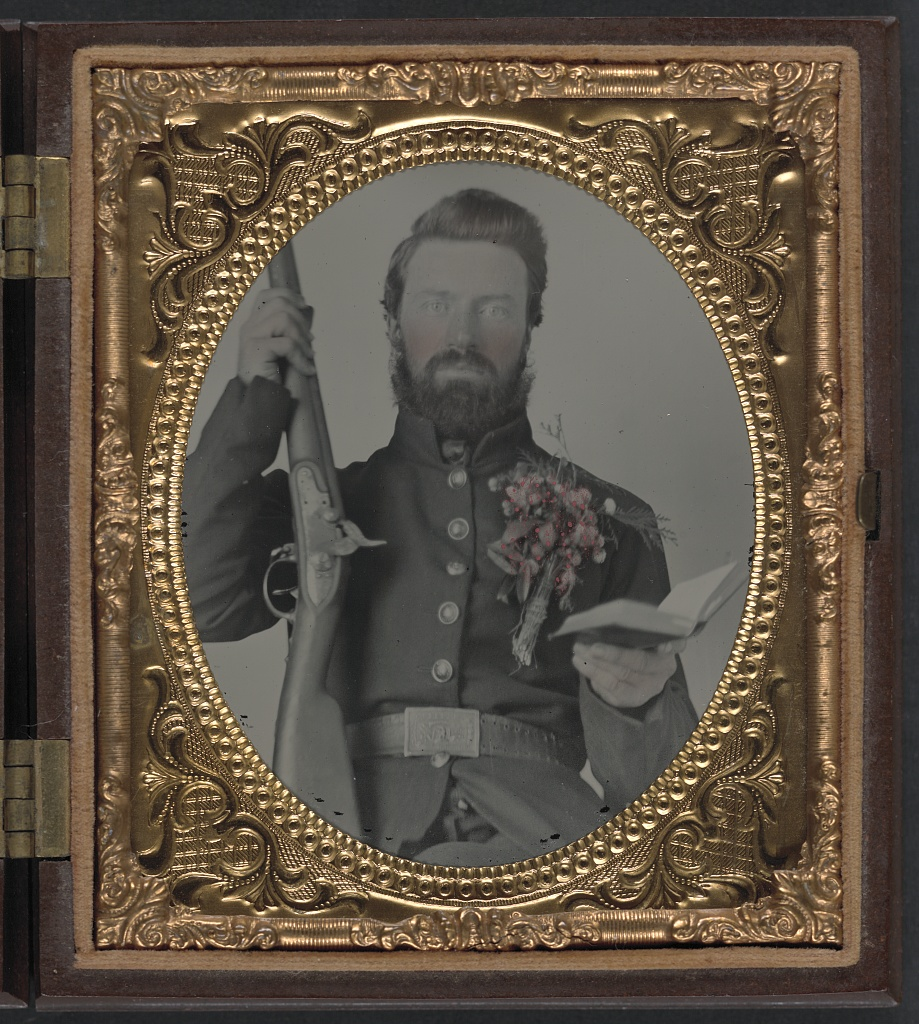
Private David Lowry, of Company E, 25th Virginia Cavalry Regiment

== See also ==
- List of Virginia Civil War units
