= Horace Capron =

American businessman, agriculturalist and Army officer (1804–85)

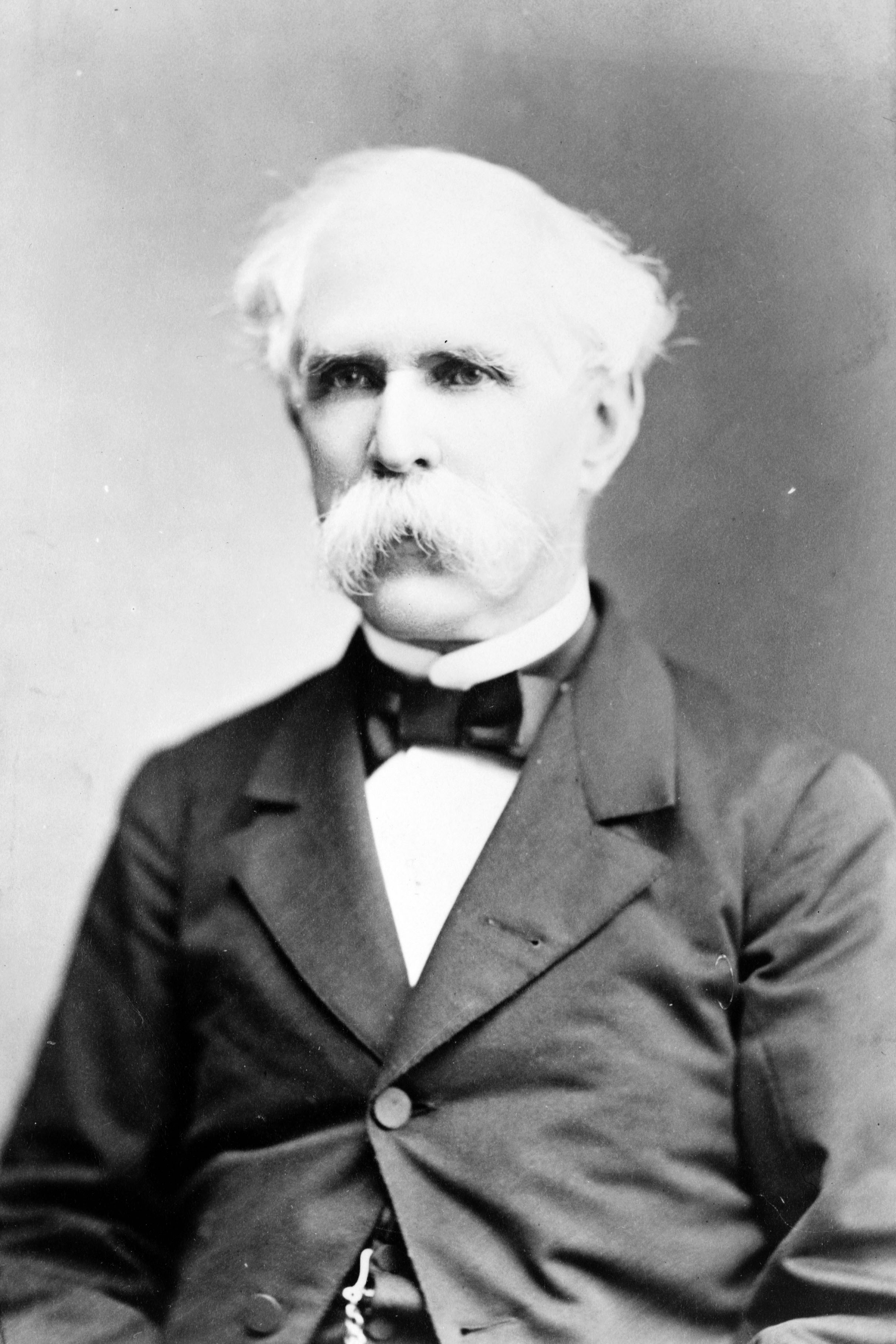
- Capron c. 1860–65

2nd United States Commissioner of Agriculture
- In office December 4, 1867 – July 31, 1871
- President: Andrew Johnson; Ulysses S. Grant
- Preceded by: Isaac Newton
- Succeeded by: Frederick Watts

Personal details
- Born: August 31, 1804 Attleboro, Massachusetts, U.S.
- Died: February 22, 1885 (aged 80) Washington, D.C., U.S.
- Resting place: Oak Hill Cemetery
- Children: 6, including Horace
- Awards: Order of the Rising Sun

Military service
- Branch/service: United States Army • Union Army
- Years of service: 1862–1865
- Rank: Brevet Brigadier General (after active service)
- Commands: 14th Regiment Illinois Volunteer Cavalry
- Battles/wars: American Civil War; Battle of Chancellorsville

Horace Capron (August 31, 1804 – February 22, 1885) was an American businessman and agriculturalist, a founder of Laurel, Maryland, a Union officer in the American Civil War, the United States secretary of agriculture under U.S. presidents Andrew Johnson and Ulysses S. Grant, and an advisor to Japan's Hokkaido Development Commission. His collection of Japanese art and artifacts was sold to the Smithsonian Institution after his death.

== Early life ==
Horace Capron was born in Attleboro, Massachusetts, the son of Seth Capron and his wife Eunice Mann Capron. His sister was Louisa Thiers (1814–1926), who in 1925 became the first verified person to reach age 111. His father, a doctor of medicine, opened woollen mills in New York including Whitesboro, and from this experience Horace went on to supervise several cotton mills including Savage Mill in Savage, Maryland. He was also an officer in the Maryland Militia in the 1830s. In November 1834, Capron and others gathered suspects and potential witnesses of two recent Laurel railroad murders and brought them to Merrill's tavern. Some 300 railroad workers were questioned at the Baltimore county jail.

In 1834, Horace married Louisa Victoria Snowden, whose late father Nicholas had owned Montpelier Mansion. This marriage brought lands and property. They had six children before Louisa died in 1849: Nicholas Snowden Capron, who died in infancy; Adeline Capron, who died at age 17 in Illinois; Horace Capron, Jr., who received the Medal of Honor after being killed in the Civil War; Albert Snowden Capron; Elizabeth Capron Mayo; and Osmond Tiffany Capron.

Capron was involved in the mechanization of cotton mills beginning in 1835, having worked in mills from boyhood in Massachusetts and New York. In 1836 he was a major force in forming the Patuxent Manufacturing Company, which operated the Laurel Mill, a cotton mill on the Patuxent River, and with this effort he and associates started what became the town of Laurel Factory, later Laurel, Maryland. In 1851 the mill failed, and Capron declared bankruptcy. Soon after, he obtained an appointment from the President to assist in removal and resettlement of Native Americans from Texas following the Mexican–American War. He spent several months in Texas, and then moved to a farm near Hebron, Illinois where his mother Eunice and sister Louisa Thiers had settled and were taking care of his children. Here, he built an imposing mansion. In Illinois, he was remarried to Margaret Baker and took up farming in earnest, experimenting with farming improvements, writing articles, participating in events and receiving awards for his work.

== Military service ==
In the American Civil War, Capron was called upon to establish and later lead the 14th Illinois Cavalry regiment. He was the oldest cavalry officer in the Union Army. Seeing action in a number of skirmishes and battles, ranging from Kentucky to Georgia, and losing his eldest son in battle, he left the army with an injury in 1864 and was later given the rank of Brevet Brigadier General dated to February 13, 1865.

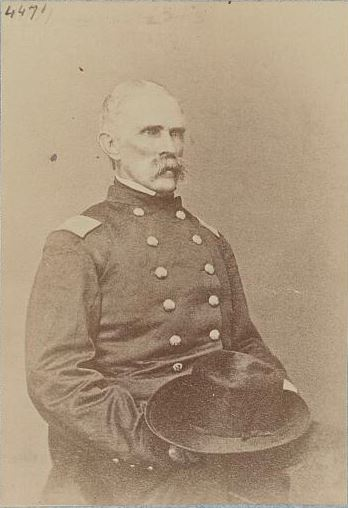
Capron in uniform

Capron was appointed lieutenant colonel of the 14th Illinois Cavalry on December 3, 1862, and promoted to colonel of the regiment on February 6, 1863. Later, Capron commanded the 2nd Brigade, 2nd Division, XXIII Corps; 1st Brigade (then 3rd Brigade), Cavalry, XXIII Corps; Dismounted Brigade, Cavalry Division, XXIII Corps; Cavalry Division, XXIII Corps; 3rd Brigade, Cavalry, XXIII Corps; 5th Division, XXIII Corps; and 1st Brigade, 6th Division, Cavalry Corps, Military Division of the Mississippi.

Capron served in the Knoxville campaign from August–December 1863. He led his regiment at the Battle of Walker's Ford on December 2. While Colonel Felix W. Graham's cavalry brigade confronted two Confederate cavalry brigades at Walker's Ford, Capron's unit was sent to the next ford to block a third Confederate brigade under William E. "Grumble" Jones. Armed with the Henry repeating rifle, Capron's 324 soldiers were able to slow and finally halt Jones' brigade before it reached the ford. Capron led a brigade in the Battle of Bean's Station on December 14. His brigade was driven off a hill on the left flank by Confederate infantry under James Longstreet. Capron's brigade consisted of the 14th Illinois, 5th Indiana, and 9th Ohio Cavalry Regiments and the 65th Indiana Mounted Infantry.

Capron's 3rd Brigade joined George Stoneman's XXIII Corps cavalry division on June 28, 1864 during the Atlanta campaign. The brigade included the 14th Illinois and 8th Michigan Cavalry Regiments and McLaughlin's Ohio Squadron. After Stoneman was captured, Capron assumed command of the cavalry division. Capron also served in the Franklin-Nashville campaign in late 1864. In early November, Capron's 800-man brigade was assigned to watch the area near Waynesboro, Tennessee. Rearmed with infantry rifles, the 14th Illinois was unable to cope with Nathan B. Forrest's hard-fighting Confederate horsemen. On November 24, Forrest's soldiers drove Capron's brigade back, though one of Capron's troopers managed to miss Forrest himself with a pistol shot from point-blank range before being captured. Two new regiments were added to Capron's brigade, bringing its strength up to 1,800 men, and it successfully defended its position at Hardison's Mill on the Duck River on November 28. Capron reported to John Schofield that the Confederates were "crossing in force". Capron's brigade was involved in a scuffle with Sul Ross' Confederate brigade that afternoon in the lead up to the Battle of Spring Hill. By the time the Battle of Nashville was fought on December 15–16, Capron was no longer leading a cavalry brigade.

His earlier experiences led to an appointment in 1867 as a Commissioner in the Department of Agriculture for the United States Government.

== Japan ==
Capron was asked by Kuroda Kiyotaka, a vice-chairman of the Hokkaidō Development Commission (開拓使, Kaitakushi) visiting the United States, to be a special advisor to the commission, and aid in the colonization of Hokkaido. Capron agreed and travelled to Hokkaidō 1870–71 as a foreign advisor. The Japanese government paid him $10,000 plus expenses to undertake this mission, which was a tremendous sum for the time. Capron needed the money, as his son Osmond had been blinded in a hotel fire, and now depended on Capron for support.

Capron spent four years in Hokkaidō, suggesting numerous ways that the frontier island could be developed. He introduced large-scale farming with American methods and farming implements, imported seeds for western fruits, vegetables and crops, and introduced livestock, including his favorite Devon and Durham cattle. He established experimental farms, had the land surveyed for mineral deposits and farming opportunities, and recommended water, mill, and road improvements. His recommendation that wheat and rye be planted in Hokkaidō due to similarities in climate with parts of the United States also led to the establishment of Sapporo Beer, one of Japan's first breweries. He contributed to the urban planning for Sapporo city with an American-style grid plan with streets at right-angles to form city blocks.

Capron's tenure in Japan was not without controversy. Articles appeared in both Japan and the United States by former associates attacking his work and his personal competency. He was often frustrated with delays in the implementation of his suggestions, or on occasion the rejection of his suggestions by more conservative members of the government. However, Kuroda Kiyotaka, future Prime Minister of Japan, was a close and trusted friend. Capron admired the Ainu of Hokkaidō, whom he compared favorably to his experiences with Native Americans. From his journals, it appears that he also admired the Japanese, although he regarded them as semi-barbaric, and firmly believed that rapid adoption of Western culture would be in Japan's best interest.

Frustrated with obstacles to his efforts, Capron returned home in 1875, though believed he had set Japan on the path of an agricultural revolution.

During his stay in Japan, Capron was honored with three audiences with Emperor Meiji, who took a close personal interest in his work in the development of Hokkaidō. In 1884, nine years after he departed Japan, Horace Capron was awarded the Order of the Rising Sun (2nd class) for his services in transforming Hokkaidō.

== Later life ==
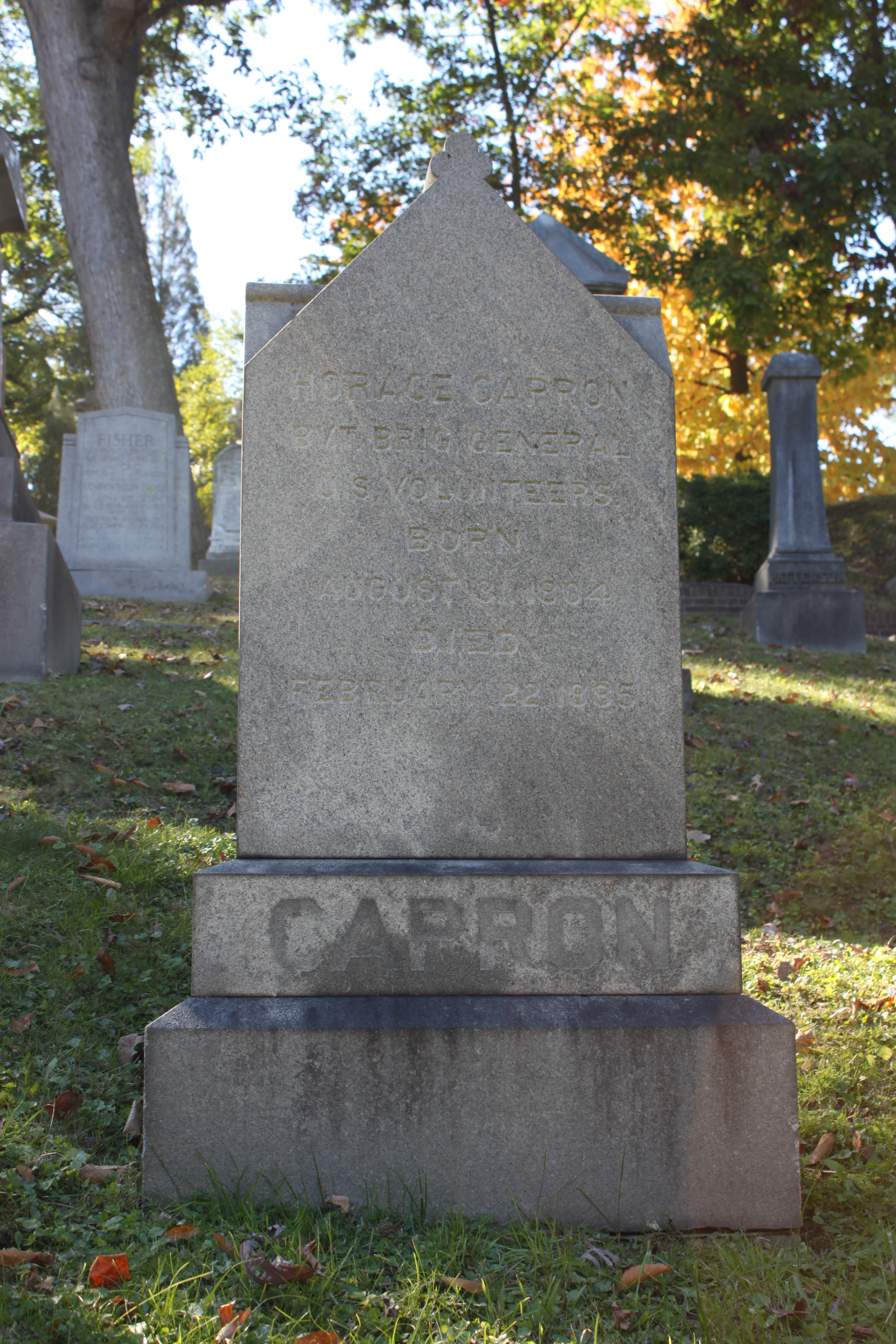
Grave of Capron at Oak Hill Cemetery

After his time in Japan, Capron continued his contacts with the country, including acting as a purchasing agent for livestock and military equipment, and selling his house on N Street in Washington, D.C. to be the site of Japan's first embassy. He was also engaged in writing his memoirs during this period.

Capron attended the dedication of the Washington Monument on February 21, 1885. The extreme cold of the day, recorded at 12° Fahrenheit (−11° Celsius), was too much for the 80-year-old Horace Capron; he suffered a stroke, and died the following day. He is buried in Oak Hill Cemetery in Georgetown, Washington, D.C.

During his period in Japan, Capron amassed a large collection of Japanese art and antiques. After his death, his widow Margaret sold the collection to the Smithsonian, where it became one of the foundations of the Smithsonian's Asian collection.

Political offices
Preceded by Isaac Newton	United States Commissioner of Agriculture; 1867–1871	Succeeded by Frederick Watts
