= John R. Fesler =

John Roush Fesler
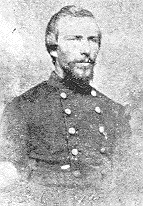
- Born: November 16, 1835; Xenia, Ohio, US
- Died: February 19, 1920 (aged 84); Indianapolis, Indiana, US
- Burial place: Crown Hill Cemetery, Indianapolis
- Spouse: Harriett Louisa Fish
- Military career
- Allegiance: United States of America
- Branch: United States Army: Union Army
- Service years: 1861–1864
- Rank: Lieutenant Colonel (USV)
- Commands: 27th Indiana Infantry Regiment
- Conflicts: American Civil War: First Battle of Winchester; Battle of Cedar Mountain; Battle of Antietam; Battle of Chancellorsville; Battle of Gettysburg; New York Draft Riots; Battle of Resaca; Battle of Kennesaw Mountain; Battle of Peachtree Creek; Siege of Atlanta

John Roush Fesler (November 16, 1835 - February 19, 1920) was a Union Army officer from Xenia, Ohio, that fought in the American Civil War.

== Early life ==
John Roush Fesler was born on November 16, 1835, in Xenia, Ohio, to William Fesler and Charity Elizabeth Roush or Rausch. John moved to Indiana and in 1859 married Harriett Louisa Fish at Mooresville.

== American Civil War ==
When the American Civil War began in 1861, Fesler sided with the Union. On August 30, 1861, he enlisted into the Union Army at Morgantown, Indiana. Fesler was made the Captain of Company G in the 27th Indiana Infantry Regiment. Fesler commanded his company at the First Battle of Winchester and at the Battle of Cedar Mountain. In 1862, Fesler's Regiment was assigned to the 12th Army Corps, in which it would remain throughout 1863. Fesler then commanded his company during the Battle of Antietam, near Sharpsburg, Maryland, on September 17, 1862. His regiment spent the winter of 1862 to 1863 camped at Stafford Courthouse, Virginia, and on February 13, 1863, Fesler was promoted to Lieutenant Colonel of the 27th Indiana. In March 1863, the 12th Corps, of which the 27th Indiana was a part, was issued a star as its corps badge. On May 5, 1863, Fesler was wounded in action during the Battle of Chancellorsville, in Spotsylvania County, Virginia. He then temporarily commanded the 27th Indiana from July 2–3, 1863 during the Battle of Gettysburg when the colonel of the regiment was placed in command of its brigade. Fesler and his regiment then took part in quelling the New York Draft Riots later that month.

In early 1864, Fesler's regiment was transferred to the new 20th Army Corps, which retained the old corps badge of the 12th. Now as part of the 20th Corps, Fesler and the 27th took part in the Atlanta campaign, fighting at the Battle of Resaca and at the Battle of Kennesaw Mountain. He again commanded the regiment at the Battle of Peachtree Creek on July 20, 1864, when the colonel was wounded. Fesler and the 27th Indiana mustered out in November 1864.

== Later life ==
After the Civil War, Fesler returned to Indiana, where he was a member of the Grand Army of the Republic (the G.A.R.), an organization of Union veterans of the Civil War. John Fesler and Harriet Fish had six children. They were: May Fesler (1860-1862), William Fesler (1865-1920), Bert Fesler (1867-1947), Emile Fesler (1870-1904), Charles Fesler (1872-1924) and Clara Fesler (1879-1927). John Roush Fesler died on February 19, 1920, in Indianapolis, Indiana. He was 84 years of age.
