= 27th Indiana Infantry Regiment =

- Regimental flag of the 27th Indiana Infantry
- Active: August 21, 1861 – November 4, 1864
- Disbanded: November 4, 1864
- Country: United States
- Allegiance: Union
- Branch: Infantry
- Type: Volunteer Regiment
- Size: Regiment
- Part of: Army of the Potomac
- Engagements: Battle of Antietam; Battle of Fredericksburg; Battle of Chancellorsville; Battle of Gettysburg; Atlanta campaign

Commanders
- Notable commanders: Colonel Silas Colgrove; Colonel James Christy

Regimental Flag of the 27th Indiana Infantry

Federal Flag of the 27th Indiana Infantry

The 27th Indiana Infantry Regiment was a Union Army infantry unit raised in southern Indiana in August 1861. Organized at Evansville under Col. Robert H. Milroy, it fought at Antietam, Fredericksburg, Chancellorsville, and Gettysburg, then joined the Atlanta campaign before mustering out in November 1864.

== Organization and muster ==
The 27th Indiana was organized at Evansville, Indiana, and mustered on August 21, 1861, for three years’ service. Recruits came largely from Vanderburgh, Gibson, Posey, Daviess, Monroe and Warrick counties. Robert H. Milroy, a former U.S. Congressman and Indiana militia general, was commissioned colonel. The regiment contained approximately 950 men in Companies A through K.

Original Organization of Regiment on August 21, 1861.
Company	Earliest Moniker	Primary place of recruitment	Earliest Captain
A	The Putnam County Grays or The Fremont Guards	Greencastle and Putnam County	Abisha Lawton Morrison
B	Daviess County Rangers	Raglesville and Daviess County	Jackson L. Moore
C	The Edinburg Company or The Edinburgh Whales	Edinburgh and Johnson County	William S. Johnson
D	Lawrence Rifles	Bedford and Lawrence County	Theodore E. Buehler
E	Washington Greys	Washington and Daviess County	George W. Burge
F	The Monroe Grenadiers	Bloomington and Monroe County	Peter Kopp
G	The Border Company or Morgan County Wildcats	Morgantown and Morgan County	John R. Fesler
H	Hoosier Rangers	Paris and Jennings County	Allen Hill
I	Warren Union Guards	Putnamville and Putnam County	Joel W. McGrew
K	The Jasper Home Guard, the Dubois Guard, or The Dutch Koompany	Jasper and Dubois County	Richmond M. Welman

== Early service and Antietam ==
Ordered east to join the Army of the Potomac, the 27th camped near Washington, D.C., into late 1861. In February 1862 it advanced into Virginia's Shenandoah Valley under Maj. Gen. Nathaniel P. Banks. The regiment saw its first combat at the Battle of Front Royal (May 23, 1862), where it helped delay the forces of Stonewall Jackson.

During the Battle of Antietam (September 17, 1862), the 27th was assigned to the brigade of George Henry Gordon in XII Corps. In the morning phase near the East Woods and Cornfield, the regiment advanced under heavy fire, capturing a Confederate battery. It suffered 85 casualties (12 killed, 50 wounded, 23 missing) out of 275 engaged.

== Fredericksburg and Chancellorsville ==
In December 1862, the 27th moved to Stafford County, Virginia, and was engaged in the Battle of Fredericksburg (December 13, 1862). Serving in the brigade of John K. Murphy in XII Corps, it advanced on Marye's Heights but was repulsed with 30 killed and 80 wounded.

During the Battle of Chancellorsville (May 1–5, 1863), the 27th, in the brigade of Thomas H. Ruger in the XII Corps, held reserve positions near Banks's Ford. It saw limited action but sustained 15 casualties during Confederate flanking movements.

== Gettysburg ==
In June 1863, the 27th joined the Gettysburg campaign. On July 1, 1863, it arrived near Cemetery Hill as part of Ruger's Brigade. On July 2, the regiment defended the eastern slopes of Culp's Hill against a Confederate division under Edward "Allegheny" Johnson . Heavy fighting on July 3 saw the 27th repulse multiple assaults, losing 50 out of 200 engaged (8 killed, 30 wounded, 12 missing). Early in the morning of July 3, 1863, the 27th Indiana Infantry Regiment, along with the 2nd Massachusetts Infantry Regiment, were ordered to attack Confederates at the southern area of Culp's Hill, or Spangler's Hill, just south of Spangler's Spring. The attack was a disaster for the United States. Both regiments lost heavily. The 27th Indiana took approximately 339 men and officers into the fighting here, and 110 of them were killed, wounded, missing or captured per The Gettysburg Daily

== Later service and the Atlanta Campaign ==
From August 15 to September 5, the regiment was on detached duty in New York during the draft disturbances. On September 24, the unit moved to Bridgeport, Alabama, transferring to the Army of the Cumberland. By October 4, they were guarding the Nashville and Chattanooga Railroad at Elkwater Bridge and Tullahoma, Tennessee.

In 1864, the regiment was veteranized at Tullahoma on January 24. They became part of the 2nd Brigade, 1st Division, XX Corps, Army of the Cumberland, in April. From May 1 to September 8, the regiment took part in the Atlanta campaign, engaging in major actions including the Battle of Rocky Face Ridge (May 8–11), and the Battle of Resaca (May 14–15), where they lost 68 men while capturing the colonel, colors, and many soldiers of the 38th Alabama Infantry Regiment.

The regiment also fought at New Hope Church (May 25), and participated in the operations along Pumpkin Vine Creek and the Battle of Dallas (May 28). From June 10 to July 2, they were involved in operations around Marietta and the assaults against Kennesaw Mountain, including actions at Pine Hill (June 11–14), Lost Mountain (June 15–17), Gilgal Church (June 15), Muddy Creek (June 17), Noyes Creek (June 19), and Kolb's Farm (June 22), where Colonel Colgrove was badly wounded and Lieutenant Colonel Fesler assumed command.

They continued in the campaign with an assault on Kennesaw Mountain (June 27), and saw action at Ruff's Station (July 4), Chattahoochee River (July 5–17), and the Battle of Peachtree Creek (July 19–20). The regiment remained engaged during the Siege of Atlanta (July 25–August 25), and participated in the operations at Chattahoochee River Bridge (August 26–September 2). They then occupied the city of Atlanta from September 2 to November 4.

The 27th Indiana Infantry Regiment was mustered out of service on November 4, 1864. Remaining veterans and recruits were transferred to the 70th Indiana Infantry Regiment.

== Casualties ==
- Killed or mortally wounded: 10 officers, 159 enlisted men
- Died of disease/other: 2 officers, 131 enlisted men
- Total fatalities: 302

== Commanders ==
- Colonel Silas Colgrove (August 1861 - July 1863): Seriously wounded at the Battle of Peachtree Creek.
- Lieutenant Colonel John R. Fesler (July 1863 – November 1864): Led through the Atlanta campaign.

== Notable people ==
- David Van Buskirk: 2nd Lieutenant (later Captain) of Company F of the 27th Indiana. Van Buskirk is described as "the biggest Yankee in the world" by Confederates and noted as one of the tallest men in the Union Army.
- John R. Fesler: The original Captain and commander of Company G. Fesler was later promoted to the rank of Lieutenant Colonel and led the regiment during the Atlanta campaign.
