= 115th Indiana Infantry Regiment =

115th Regiment Indiana Infantry
- Active: August 13, 1863 – February 25, 1864
- Country: United States
- Allegiance: Union
- Branch: Infantry
- Engagements: Battle of Blue Springs; Battle of Walker's Ford

The 115th Regiment Indiana Infantry was an infantry regiment that served in the Union Army during the American Civil War.

== Service ==
The 115th Indiana Infantry was organized at Indianapolis, Indiana for a six-month enlistment and mustered in on August 13, 1863, under the command of Colonel John R. Mahan.

The regiment was attached to Mahan's 1st Brigade, Wilcox's Left Wing Forces, Department of the Ohio, to February 1864.

The 115th Indiana Infantry mustered out of service on February 25, 1864.

== Detailed service ==
Moved to Nicholasville, Kentucky, September 16. Marched from Nicholasville, to Cumberland Gap September 24 – October 3, 1863, and to Morristown October 6–8. Action at Blue Springs October 10. Duty at Greenville until November 6. Moved to Bull's Gap November 6, and duty there until December. Marched across Clinch Mountain to the Clinch River. Action at Walker's Ford December 2. Guard and patrol duty in eastern Tennessee until February 1864.

== Casualties ==
The regiment lost a total of 70 men during service; 1 enlisted men killed, 69 enlisted men died of disease.

== Commanders ==
- Colonel John R. Mahan

== See also ==
- List of Indiana Civil War regiments
- Indiana in the Civil War
