= 21st Ohio Independent Light Artillery Battery =

21st Ohio Battery
- Active: April 29, 1863, to July 21, 1865
- Country: United States
- Allegiance: Union
- Branch: Artillery
- Engagements: Morgan's Raid

21st Ohio Battery was an artillery battery that served in the Union Army during the American Civil War.

== Service ==
The 21st Ohio Battery was organized at Camp Dennison near Cincinnati, Ohio and mustered in April 29, 1863, for a three-year enlistment under Captain James W. Patterson.

The battery was attached to Willcox's Left Wing, IX Corps, Department of the Ohio, to October 1863. 2nd Brigade, Left Wing, Department of the Ohio, to January 1864. District of the Clinch, Department of the Ohio, to April 1864. 2nd Brigade, 4th Division, XXIII Corps, Department of the Ohio, to February 1865. 2nd Brigade, 4th Division, District of East Tennessee, Department of the Cumberland, to July 1865.

Captain Patterson resigned on March 9, 1864. Lieutenant James N. Walley was promoted to Captain, and was in command until the Battery mustered out of service on July 21, 1865.

== Detailed service ==
Ordered to West Virginia on May 5. Returned to Camp Dennison on May 20, and served duty there until September. Pursuit of Morgan through Indiana and Ohio from July 5–28. Moved to Camp Nelson, Kentucky, September 22. Moved from Camp Nelson, to Greenville, Tennessee, October 1. Action at Blue Springs on October 10. Walker's Ford on December 2. Duty at various points in Tennessee and Alabama until July 1865.

== Casualties ==
The battery lost a total of 9 men during service; 1 officer and 8 enlisted men died due to disease.

== Commanders ==
- Captain James W. Patterson
- Captain James N. Walley

== See also ==
- List of Ohio Civil War units
- Ohio in the Civil War
