= 27th Virginia Partisan Rangers Battalion =

27th Battalion Virginia Partisan Rangers
- Flag of Virginia, 1861
- Active: September 1862 – April 1864
- Country: Confederacy
- Allegiance: Confederate States of America
- Branch: Confederate States Army
- Type: Cavalry
- Engagements: American Civil War

The 27th Battalion Virginia Partisan Rangers was a cavalry regiment raised in Virginia for service in the Confederate States Army during the American Civil War. It fought mostly in East Tennessee and western Virginia.

Virginia's 27th Battalion Partisan Rangers was formed in September, 1862, with seven companies, later increased to nine. The unit served in General Hodge's and W.E. Jones' Brigade and participated in various engagements in East Tennessee and western Virginia. During April, 1864, it contained 240 effectives, and in July it merged into the 25th Virginia Cavalry Regiment. Lieutenant Colonel Henry A. Edmundson was in command.

== See also ==
- List of Virginia Civil War units
