= Battle of Rogersville =

Battle of the American Civil War

- Part of the American Civil War
Date	November 6, 1863
Location	Rogersville, Tennessee 36°24′26″N 83°0′20″W
Result	Confederate victory

Belligerents
USA (Union)	CSA (Confederacy)

Commanders and leaders
Colonel Israel Garrard; Major Daniel Carpenter	Brigadier General William E. Jones

Units involved
3rd Brigade, 4th Cavalry Division	Jones' Brigade; 2nd Cavalry Brigade; 8th Virginia Cavalry

Casualties and losses
655	Unknown killed/injured

The Battle of Rogersville was a conflict in and around the town of Rogersville, Tennessee, on the morning of November 6, 1863, between the United States Army 3rd Brigade, 4th Cavalry Division and the Confederate States Army Jones' Brigade, 2nd Cavalry Brigade and the 8th Virginia Cavalry. Because Federal forces were caught largely by surprise, the Confederates, under Brigadier General William E. Jones, were able to recapture Rogersville along with significant supplies from the town's railroad storehouses.

== Union casualties ==
Union casualties are reported in the following table. A note asserted that wounded soldiers were probably reported as captured. Another source stated that Battery M lost 4 men killed and 35 captured. All its guns were spiked and abandoned, but 86 men, 50 horses, and some equipment avoided capture.

Union casualties reported at Rogersville, Tenn. November 6, 1863
Unit	Officers killed	Enlisted killed	Officers wounded	Enlisted wounded	Officers captured	Enlisted captured	Aggregate
2nd Ohio Cavalry Regiment	0	0	0	0	0	1	1
7th Ohio Cavalry Regiment	0	0	0	2	1	118	121
2nd Regiment Tennessee Mounted Infantry	0	5	0	1	20	474	500
Battery M, 2nd Illinois Light Artillery	0	0	0	0	0	33	33
Totals	0	5	0	3	21	626	655
