= Henry A. Edmundson =

American politician (1814–1890)

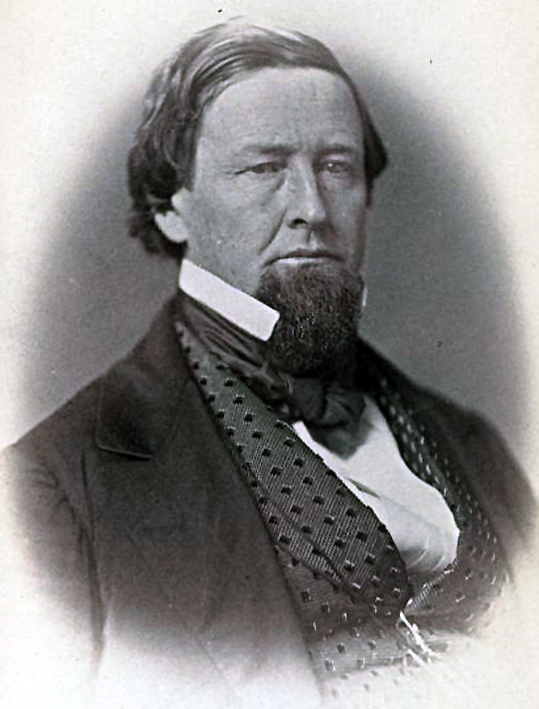

Member of the U.S. House of Representatives from Virginia's 12th district
- In office March 4, 1849 – March 3, 1861
- Preceded by: William B. Preston
- Succeeded by: Kellian Whaley

Personal details
- Born: Henry Alonzo Edmundson; June 14, 1814 Blacksburg, Virginia, U.S.
- Died: December 16, 1890 (aged 76) Shawsville, Virginia, U.S.
- Party: Democratic
- Spouse: Mary Lewis (m. 1840; died 1848)
- Children: 4
- Education: Georgetown University
- Occupation: Politician; lawyer

Military service
- Allegiance: Confederate States
- Branch/service: Confederate States Army
- Rank: Lieutenant colonel
- Unit: 25th Virginia Cavalry
- Battles/wars: American Civil War

Henry Alonzo Edmundson (June 14, 1814 – December 16, 1890) was an American lawyer, congressman, farmer, slaveowner and Confederate officer. He served six terms in the U.S. House of Representatives from 1849 to 1861.

== Early and family life ==
He was born in Blacksburg, Virginia on either June 8 or 14 and sometime between 1813 and 1817 to Margaret King and her husband, Henry Edmundson. Henry was named after his father and raised by his stepmother, Maria Antoinette Radford Edmunson. His father farmed using enslaved labor and represented Montgomery County, Virginia in the Virginia House of Delegates four times, including when young Henry was a boy. The elder Edmundson also farmed and bought the Alleghany Turnpike in 1828. He hired private tutors for his son. Young Henry was sent to Washington, D.C. for higher education, and graduated from Georgetown College. When young Henry returned, he moved to Roanoke County and studied law.

On January 7, 1840, Henry Edmundson married Mary Agnes Strother Lewis. They had two daughters and two sons before she died in 1848.

== Career ==
Admitted to the Virginia bar in 1838, Edmundson began his legal practice in Salem, Virginia and was elected the Roanoke County Commonwealth's attorney (prosecutor) in 1845. Edmundson also farmed using enslaved labor. In the 1830 census, Edmundson owned 30 slaves, (18 of them children younger than 10). In the 1840 census, he owned 24 slaves, of whom 6 were 10 years old or younger. In 1850, Edmonson owned 800 acres of land in Montgomery county and six slaves older than 12 in Montgomery County and one adult and five young slaves in Roanoke County.

== Politics ==
In 1848, voters from the vast western Virginia district comprising Alleghany, Bath, Boone, Botetourt, Floyd, Giles, Greenbrier, Logan, Mercer, Monroe, Montgomery, Pocahontas, Pulaski and Roanoke counties elected Edmundson as a Democrat to the United States House of Representatives. He defeated a Whig opponent and served until 1861. During that term, he voted against abolishing the slave trade in the District of Columbia as well as against admitting California as a free state. Edmundson faced no opponent and was re-elected in both 1851 and 1853. However, in 1855 the district boundaries had changed, adding Craig, Fayette, Nicholas Raleigh Wayne and Wyoming counties to the district. Nonetheless, Edmundson defeated the Know-nothing Party's candidate, Walter Redd Staples. He also won re-election easily in 1857 and 1859. Edmundson was chairman of the Committee on Expenditures on Public Buildings from 1853 to 1855.

On May 12, 1854, during a House session on the Kansas-Nebraska Act, Edmundson was arrested by the Sergeant-at-Arms. After Ohio representative Lewis D. Campbell addressed an increasingly bitter and violent House nearly thirty-six hours into the session, Edmundson reportedly began unbuttoning his vest as if reaching for a weapon and attempted to attack Campbell, but was restrained by other members and arrested. The House adjourned after the incident. On January 18, 1856, during a debate to elect a speaker, Ohio Free-soiler Joshua Reed Giddings sarcastically quoted lines from Julius Caesar, "Go, show your slaves how choleric you are/ And make your bondsmen tremble". Edmundson's advance toward the speaker caused confusion.

Later in the session, on May 22, 1856, Edmundson accompanied Preston Brooks when he brutally attacked Charles Sumner on the floor of the United States Senate with his cane. A resolution to censure Edmundson was introduced for his involvement in the incident along with Brooks and Laurence M. Keitt (another accomplice); while the House censured Brooks and Keitt, it voted not to censure Edmundson. Edmundson served as one of Brooks' pallbearers the following year. On February 10, 1860, Edmundson attacked Pennsylvania Congressman John Hickman on the Capitol grounds for ridiculing Virginia's response to John Brown's raid as excessive. That August, as Staples canvassed for the Constitutional Union candidates in Christiansburg, Virginia, Edmundson exchanged blows with Staples.

Meanwhile, Edmunson's willingness to thrash "ungentlemanly northern curs" won him admirers as well as enemies. His name was placed into nomination for lieutenant Governor at the Democratic state convention in 1855, and he finished third of six Democratic gubernatorial candidates in 1858.

== Confederate officer ==
As Virginia debated secession on April 6, 1861, Edmundson addressed a mass meeting in Roanoke and raised a secessionist flag as well as addressed the crowd. As Virginia seceded, Edmundson resigned from Congress and served three months as a volunteer aide-de-camp to the governor. On September 4, 1861, he accepted a commission as lieutenant colonel in the 54th Virginia Infantry and joined the newly formed Confederate States Army. The regiment was reorganized in May 1862, and Edmundson was dropped. However, he recruited the 27th Battalion Partisan Rangers, and received a promotion to Major after his re-enlistment; the unit became the 25th Virginia Cavalry and promoted to full Lieutenant Colonel on April 23, 1863, then mustered out citing ill health on October 8, 1864.

== Later life ==
In March 1864, Edmundson bought 1/6th of the Yellow Sulphur Spring Company from his brother. The mineral spring resort was about five miles from Fotheringay, an estate he had inherited. Seven years later, Edmundson and three partners sold their interests for $25,000. After General Lee's surrender, Edmundson returned to practicing law, but could not secure the position as counsel to the Virginia and Tennessee Railroad that he wanted. He stopped practicing law in 1880 turned to farming and land speculation.

Edmundson died at his home, "Falling Waters" in Shawsville, Virginia on December 16, 1890, aged 76.

U.S. House of Representatives
Preceded by William B. Preston	Member of the U.S. House of Representatives from Virginia's 12th congressional district March 4, 1849 – March 3, 1861 (obsolete district)	Succeeded by Kellian Whaley
