= 14th Illinois Cavalry Regiment =

14th Regiment Illinois Volunteer Cavalry
- Illinois flag
- Active: January 7, 1863, to August 31, 1865
- Country: United States
- Allegiance: Union
- Branch: Cavalry
- Engagements: Battle of Buffington Island; Siege of Knoxville; Battle of Nashville

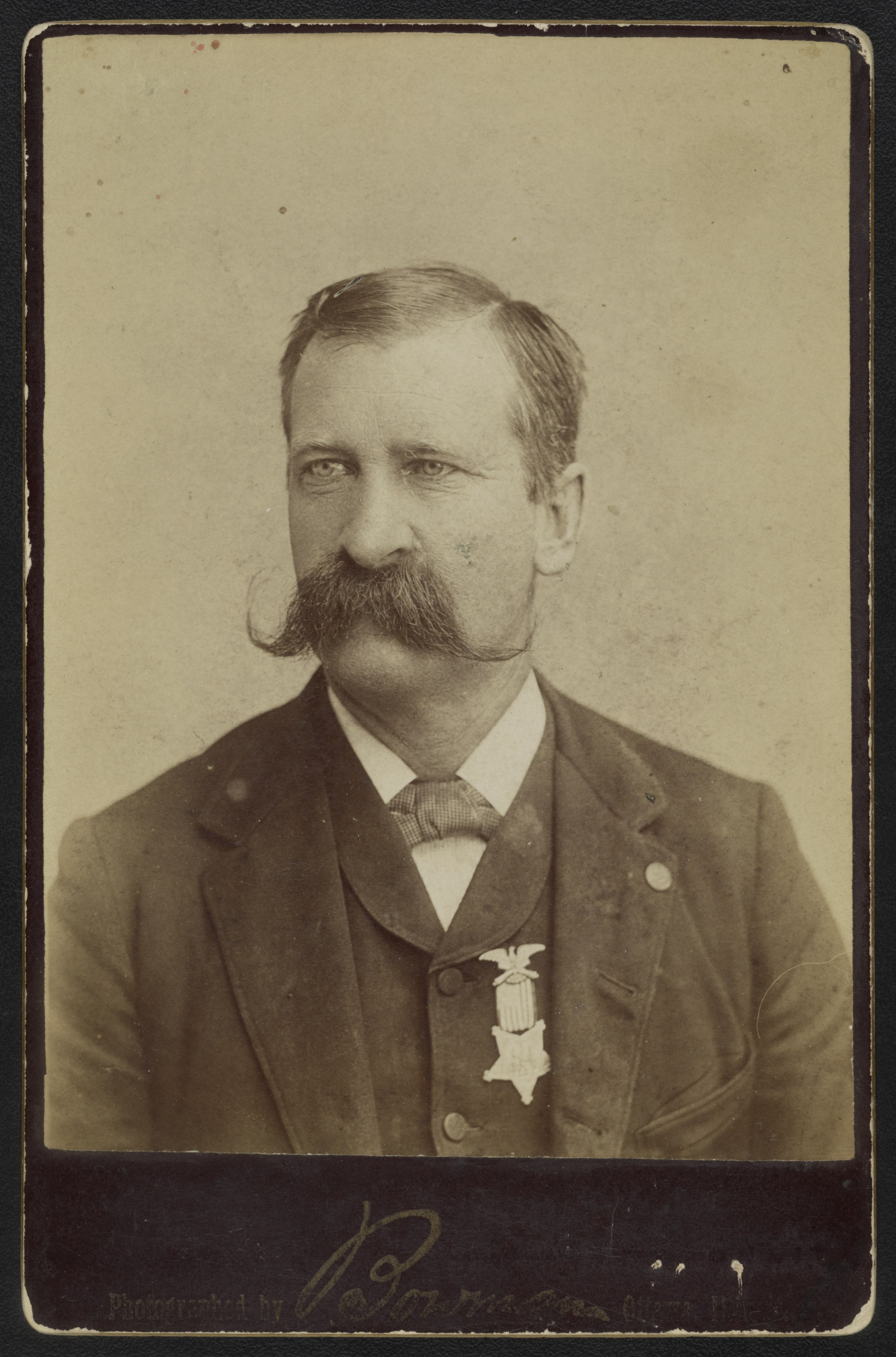
John W. January, veteran of Co. B, 14th Illinois Cavalry Regiment. He was a prisoner of war at Andersonville, Georgia, and lost his feet from scurvy and gangrene. From the Liljenquist Family Collection of Civil War Photographs, Prints and Photographs Division, Library of Congress

The 14th Regiment Illinois Volunteer Cavalry was a cavalry regiment that served in the Union Army during the American Civil War.

== Service ==
The first two battalions of the 14th Illinois Cavalry were mustered into service at Peoria, Illinois, on January 7, 1863. The third battalion was mustered at Peoria on February 6, 1863.

The regiment was mustered out on July 31, 1865.

== Total strength and casualties ==
The regiment suffered 2 officers and 23 enlisted men who were killed in action or who died of their wounds and 190 enlisted men who died of disease, for a total of 215 fatalities.

== Commanders ==
- Colonel Horace Capron - resigned January 23, 1865
- Colonel Francis Davison - mustered out with the regiment.

== See also ==
- List of Illinois Civil War Units
- Illinois in the American Civil War
