= M1841 mountain howitzer =

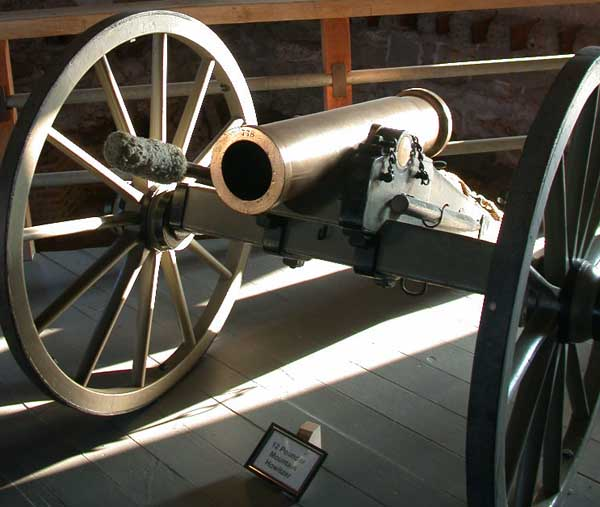
- M1841 12 pounder mountain howitzer on display at Fort Laramie in eastern Wyoming.
- Type: Mountain gun
- Place of origin: United States

Service history
- In service: 1841–ca. 1877
- Used by: United States
- Wars: American Indian Wars, Mexican–American War, American Civil War

Specifications
- Mass: 220 pounds (100 kg) (barrel weight only), 500 pounds (227 kg) with carriage
- Caliber: 12 lb (4.62 in)
- Carriage: pole trail
- Traverse: 0°
- Effective firing range: 1,005 yards (919 m)

The M1841 mountain howitzer was a mountain gun used by the United States Army during the mid-nineteenth century, from 1837 to about 1870. It saw service during the Mexican–American War of 1846–1848, the American Indian Wars, and during the American Civil War, 1861–1865 (primarily in the more rugged western theaters).

The howitzer was a bronze smoothbore 12-pounder weapon, optimized for firing explosive shells as well as spherical case and canister. Its range was 1,005 yards (919 m) at +5° elevation with a charge of 0.5 pounds (0.2 kg) of black powder when firing shell. The original carriage design allowed the piece to be broken down into three loads for pack animal transport: the tube carried on one animal, carriage and wheels by another, and ammunition on the third.

The mountain howitzer was designed to be lightweight and highly portable. Because of this, and its ease of disassembly, it did not require roads for transportation making it well suited to Indian fighting and mountain warfare. In addition to the pack carriage, a prairie carriage was also created for traditional draft pulling using only two horses. This versatility permitted their use with mounted forces in areas where roads were little more than paths. These small howitzers provided artillery support for mobile military forces where it would otherwise be unavailable. However, their shorter range made them unsuitable for dueling with other heavier field artillery weapons.

The first 13 units of this weapon were manufactured in 1837 at the U.S. Watervliet Arsenal in Troy, New York; one of these was carried on John C. Frémont's Second Expedition to explore and map the Oregon Trail in 1843–1844. Frémont had to abandon the howitzer in late January 1843 in a canyon on the east side of Sonora Pass, in what is now a part of Humboldt-Toiyabe National Forest near Burcham Flat, when exhaustion of the expedition's food supplies forced a risky decision to make a winter crossing of the Sierra Nevada to reach Sutter's Fort near Sacramento, California. A few wrought iron parts of Frémont's howitzer, including one of the two axle trunnion assemblies and three iron wheel tires, were found by search teams using metal detectors in the late 1990s and early 2000s. These parts have been authenticated by U.S. Army historian Lieutenant Colonel Paul R. Rosewitz as belonging to a pre-Civil War model M1841, and from the location of the find, could only have come from the Fremont Second Expedition howitzer. It is possible that the barrel was found in 1960 by Francois Uzes, but it was not recovered at that time, and has not been re-located as of 2015 despite several search efforts. The parts that have been recovered are on display at the U.S. Forest Service Ranger office in Bridgeport, California.

== Bibliography ==
- Grizzell, Stephen, "Bull Pup: The 1841 Mountain Howitzer."
- Hazlett, James C., Edwin Olmstead, and M. Hume Parks. Field Artillery Weapons of the American Civil War, rev. ed., Urbana: University of Illinois Press, 1983. ISBN 0-252-07210-3.
- http://www.batteryb.com/mountain_howitzer.html
- Ripley, Warren. Artillery and Ammunition of the Civil War. 4th ed. Charleston, SC: The Battery Press, 1984. OCLC 12668104.
