= Battle of Blue Springs =

Battle of the American Civil War

Coordinates: 36.1934°N 82.9373°W

- Part of the American Civil War
Date	October 10, 1863
Location	Greene County, Tennessee
Result	Union victory

Belligerents
United States (Union)	CSA (Confederacy)

Commanders and leaders
Ambrose Burnside	John S. Williams

Units involved
Army of the Ohio	1st Tennessee Volunteer Cavalry; 4th Kentucky Cavalry

Casualties and losses
100	216

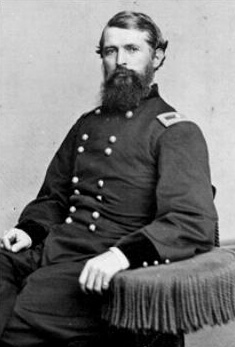
Rear Admiral/ Brevet Major General Samuel P. Carter

The Battle of Blue Springs was a battle of the American Civil War, occurring on October 10, 1863, in Greene County, Tennessee.

Major General Ambrose E. Burnside, commander of the Department of the Ohio, undertook an expedition into East Tennessee to clear the roads and passes to Virginia, and, if possible, secure the saltworks beyond Abingdon. In October, Confederate brigadier general, John S. Williams, with his cavalry force, set out to disrupt Union communications and logistics. He wished to take Bulls Gap on the East Tennessee & Virginia Railroad. On October 3, while advancing on Bulls Gap, he fought with Brig. Gen. Samuel P. Carter's Union Cavalry Division, XXIII Corps, at Blue Springs, about nine miles from Bulls Gap, on the railroad. Carter, not knowing how many of the enemy he faced, withdrew.

Carter and Williams skirmished for the next few days. On October 10, Carter approached Blue Springs in force. Williams had received some reinforcements. The battle began about 10:00 a.m. with Union cavalry engaging the Confederates until the afternoon while another mounted force attempted to place itself in a position to cut off a Confederate retreat. Captain Orlando M. Poe, the chief engineer, performed a reconnaissance to identify the best location for making an infantry attack. At 3:30 pm, Brig. Gen. Edward Ferrero's 1st Division, IX Corps, moved up to attack, which they did at 5:00 p.m. Ferrero's men broke into the Confederate line, causing heavy casualties, and advanced almost to the enemy's rear before being checked. After dark, the Confederates withdrew and the Federals took up the pursuit in the morning. Within days, Williams and his men had retired to Virginia. Burnside had launched the East Tennessee campaign to reduce or extinguish Confederate influence in the area; Blue Springs helped fulfill that mission.
