= Atlanta campaign order of battle: Second phase, Union =

Units in the 1864 campaign

The following Union Army units and commanders fought in the Atlanta campaign of the American Civil War. The Confederate order of battle is listed separately. Order of battle compiled from the army organization during the campaign.

This order of battle covers the second phase of the campaign, July 17 – September 8, 1864. The period May 1 – July 17, 1864, is listed separately.

== Abbreviations used ==
=== Military rank ===
- MG = Major General
- BG = Brigadier General
- Col = Colonel
- Ltc = Lieutenant Colonel
- Maj = Major
- Cpt = Captain

=== Other ===
- w = wounded
- mw = mortally wounded
- k = killed

== Military Division of the Mississippi ==
MG William T. Sherman
Chief of Artillery: BG William F. Barry
Headquarters Guard: 7th Company Ohio Sharpshooters: Lieut. William McCrory

=== Army of the Cumberland ===
MG George Henry Thomas
Chief of Artillery: BG John M. Brannan
Escort: Company I, 1st Ohio Cavalry: Lieut. Henry C. Reppert

==== IV Corps ====
MG Oliver O. Howard
MG David S. Stanley

| Division | Brigade | Regiments and others |
|---|---|---|
| First Division; MG David S. Stanley; BG William Grose; BG Nathan Kimball | 1st Brigade Col Isaac M. Kirby | 21st Illinois; 38th Illinois; 31st Indiana; 81st Indiana; 90th Ohio; 101st Ohio |
| First Division; MG David S. Stanley; BG William Grose; BG Nathan Kimball | 2nd Brigade Col Jacob E. Taylor | 59th Illinois (from August 16 to August 19); 96th Illinois; 115th Illinois; 35th Indiana; 84th Indiana (until August 19); 21st Kentucky; 23rd Kentucky (from August 19); 40th Ohio; 45th Ohio; 51st Ohio |
| First Division; MG David S. Stanley; BG William Grose; BG Nathan Kimball | 3rd Brigade BG William Grose; Col Sidney Post; Col John Bennett | 59th Illinois (until August 16); 75th Illinois; 80th Illinois; 84th Illinois; 9th Indiana; 30th Indiana; 36th Indiana; 84th Indiana (from August 19); 77th Pennsylvania |
| Second Division; BG John Newton | 1st Brigade BG Nathan Kimball; Col Emerson Opdycke | 36th Illinois; 44th Illinois; 73rd Illinois; 74th Illinois; 88th Illinois; 2nd Missouri; 15th Missouri; 24th Wisconsin |
| Second Division; BG John Newton | 2nd Brigade Col John Blake; BG George D. Wagner | 100th Illinois; 40th Indiana; 57th Indiana; 28th Kentucky; 26th Ohio; 97th Ohio |
| Second Division; BG John Newton | 3rd Brigade BG Luther P. Bradley | 27th Illinois (until August 25); 42nd Illinois; 51st Illinois; 79th Illinois; 3rd Kentucky; 64th Ohio; 65th Ohio; 125th Ohio |
| Third Division; BG Thomas J. Wood (w September 2); Col Sidney Post | 1st Brigade Col William H. Gibson; Col Charles Hotchkiss | 25th Illinois (until August 1); 35th Illinois (until August 25); 89th Illinois; 32nd Indiana (until August 2); 8th Kansas; 15th Ohio; 49th Ohio; 15th Wisconsin |
| Third Division; BG Thomas J. Wood (w September 2); Col Sidney Post | 2nd Brigade BG William B. Hazen; Col Oliver Payne; Col Sidney Post | 59th Illinois (from August 19); 6th Indiana (until August 19); 5th Kentucky (until July 25); 6th Kentucky (until August 9); 23rd Kentucky (until August 19); 1st Ohio; 41st Ohio; 71st Ohio (from August 31); 93rd Ohio; 124th Ohio |
| Third Division; BG Thomas J. Wood (w September 2); Col Sidney Post | 3rd Brigade Col Frederick Knefler | 79th Indiana; 86th Indiana; 9th Kentucky; 17th Kentucky; 13th Ohio; 19th Ohio; 59th Ohio |
| Corps Artillery Brigade; Maj Thomas W. Osborn; Cpt Lyman Bridges | Cpt Theodore Thomasson; Cpt Wilbur Goodspeed; Cpt Cullen Bradley | Battery M, 1st Illinois Light; Bridges' Illinois Light Battery; 5th Indiana Light Battery; Battery A, 1st Ohio Light; Battery M, 1st Ohio Light (from July 26); 6th Ohio Light Battery; Battery B, Pennsylvania Light |

==== XIV Corps ====
MG John M. Palmer
BG Richard W. Johnson
BG Jefferson C. Davis

| Division | Brigade | Regiments and others |
|---|---|---|
| First Division; BG Richard W. Johnson; BG John H. King; BG William P. Carlin | 1st Brigade Col Anson G. McCook; BG William P. Carlin; Col Marion Taylor | 104th Illinois; 42nd Indiana; 88th Indiana; 15th Kentucky; 2nd Ohio; 33rd Ohio; 94th Ohio; 10th Wisconsin; 21st Wisconsin |
| First Division; BG Richard W. Johnson; BG John H. King; BG William P. Carlin | 2nd Brigade BG John H. King; Maj John Edie | 11th Michigan: Colonel William L. Stoughton; 1st Battalion, 15th U.S. Infantry: Maj Albert Tracy; 2nd Battalion, 15th U.S. Infantry: Maj John R. Edie; 1st Battalion, 16th U.S. Infantry: Cpt Alexander H. Stanton; 2nd Battalion, 16th U.S. Infantry: Cpt R. P. Barry; 1st Battalion, 18th U.S. Infantry: Cpt G. W. Smtih; 2nd Battalion, 18th U.S. Infantry: Cpt William J. Fetterman; 19th U.S. Infantry (5 companies): Cpt James Mooney |
| First Division; BG Richard W. Johnson; BG John H. King; BG William P. Carlin | 3rd Brigade Col Marshall F. Moore | 37th Indiana; 38th Indiana; 21st Ohio; 69th Ohio; 74th Ohio; 78th Pennsylvania; 79th Pennsylvania; 1st Wisconsin |
| Second Division; BG Jefferson C. Davis; BG James D. Morgan | 1st Brigade BG James D. Morgan; Col Charles Lum | 10th Illinois (until August 20); 16th Illinois; 60th Illinois; 10th Michigan; 14th Michigan; 17th New York Veteran (from August 20) |
| Second Division; BG Jefferson C. Davis; BG James D. Morgan | 2nd Brigade Col John G. Mitchell | 34th Illinois; 78th Illinois; 98th Ohio; 108th Ohio; 113th Ohio; 121st Ohio |
| Second Division; BG Jefferson C. Davis; BG James D. Morgan | 3rd Brigade Col Caleb J. Dilworth (w September 1); Ltc James Langley | 85th Illinois; 86th Illinois; 110th Illinois; 125th Illinois; 22nd Indiana; 52nd Ohio |
| Third Division; BG Absalom Baird | 1st Brigade Col Moses B. Walker | 82nd Indiana; 23rd Missouri; 17th Ohio; 31st Ohio; 89th Ohio; 92nd Ohio |
| Third Division; BG Absalom Baird | 2nd Brigade Col Newell Gleason | 75th Indiana; 87th Indiana; 101st Indiana; 2nd Minnesota; 35th Ohio (until August 3); 105th Ohio |
| Third Division; BG Absalom Baird | 3rd Brigade Col George P. Este | 10th Indiana; 74th Indiana; 10th Kentucky; 18th Kentucky; 14th Ohio; 38th Ohio |
| Corps Artillery Brigade; Maj Charles Houghtaling | Cpt Lucius Drury; Cpt Charles Barnett; Cpt George Estep | Battery C, 1st Illinois Light Artillery; Battery I, 2nd Illinois Light Artillery; 7th Indiana Light Battery; 19th Indiana Light Battery; 20th Indiana Light Battery (from August 14); 2nd Minnesota Battery (detachment); Battery I, 1st Ohio (until August 14); 5th Wisconsin Light Battery |

==== XX Corps ====
MG Joseph Hooker
BG Alpheus S. Williams
MG Henry Slocum

| Division | Brigade | Regiments and others |
|---|---|---|
| First Division; BG Alpheus S. Williams; BG Joseph F. Knipe | 1st Brigade BG Joseph F. Knipe; Col Warren Packer | 5th Connecticut; 3rd Maryland (detachment); 123rd New York; 141st New York; 46th Pennsylvania |
| First Division; BG Alpheus S. Williams; BG Joseph F. Knipe | 2nd Brigade BG Thomas H. Ruger | 27th Indiana; 2nd Massachusetts; 13th New Jersey; 107th New York; 150th New York; 3rd Wisconsin |
| First Division; BG Alpheus S. Williams; BG Joseph F. Knipe | 3rd Brigade Col James S. Robinson; Col Horace Broughton | 82nd Illinois; 101st Illinois; 143rd New York; 61st Ohio; 82nd Ohio; 31st Wisconsin |
| Second Division; BG John W. Geary | 1st Brigade Col Charles Candy; Col Ario Pardee Jr. | 5th Ohio; 29th Ohio; 66th Ohio; 28th Pennsylvania; 147th Pennsylvania: Col Ario Pardee |
| Second Division; BG John W. Geary | 2nd Brigade Col Patrick Henry Jones; Col George W. Mindil | 33rd New Jersey; 119th New York; 134th New York; 154th New York; 73rd Pennsylvania; 109th Pennsylvania |
| Second Division; BG John W. Geary | 3rd Brigade Col David Ireland | 60th New York; 102nd New York; 137th New York; 149th New York; 29th Pennsylvania; 111th Pennsylvania |
| Third Division; BG William T. Ward | 1st Brigade Col Benjamin Harrison | 102nd Illinois; 105th Illinois; 129th Illinois; 70th Indiana; 79th Ohio |
| Third Division; BG William T. Ward | 2nd Brigade Col John Coburn | 33rd Indiana; 85th Indiana; 19th Michigan; 22nd Wisconsin |
| Third Division; BG William T. Ward | 3rd Brigade Col James Wood | 20th Connecticut; 33rd Massachusetts; 136th New York; 55th Ohio; 73rd Ohio; 26th Wisconsin |
| Corps Artillery Brigade Maj John A. Reynolds | Cpt John D. Woodbury; Cpt Charles Aleshire; Cpt Marco B. Gary | Battery I, 1st Michigan Light; Battery I, 1st New York Light; Battery M, 1st New York Light; 13th New York Light Battery; Battery C, 1st Ohio Light; Battery E, Pennsylvania Light; Battery K, 5th United States (from August 25) |
| Unattached Units | Reserve Brigade Col Heber Le Favour | 9th Michigan; 22nd Michigan |
| Unattached Units | Pontooniers Col George P. Buell | 58th Indiana |
| Unattached Units | Siege Artillery Cpt Arnold Sutermeister | 11th Indiana Battery |

==== Cavalry Corps ====
BG Washington Elliott, Chief of Cavalry, Army of the Cumberland

| Division | Brigade | Regiments and others |
|---|---|---|
| First Division; BG Edward M. McCook | 1st Brigade Col Joseph B. Dorr; Col John T. Croxton; Ltc James Brownlow | 8th Iowa Cavalry; 4th Kentucky Mounted Infantry; 1st Tennessee Cavalry |
| First Division; BG Edward M. McCook | 2nd Brigade Ltc Horace Lamson; Ltc William Torrey (w July 30) | 2nd Indiana Cavalry; 4th Indiana Cavalry; 1st Wisconsin Cavalry |
| First Division; BG Edward M. McCook | 3rd Brigade Col John Faulkner; Col Louis D. Watkins | 4th Kentucky Cavalry; 6th Kentucky Cavalry; 7th Kentucky Cavalry |
| First Division; BG Edward M. McCook | Artillery | 18th Indiana Horse Artillery Battery |
| Second Division; BG Kenner Garrard | 1st Brigade Col Robert Minty | 4th Michigan Cavalry; 7th Pennsylvania Cavalry; 4th U.S. Cavalry |
| Second Division; BG Kenner Garrard | 2nd Brigade Col Eli Long (w August 20); Col Beroth Eggleston | 1st Ohio Cavalry; 3rd Ohio Cavalry; 4th Ohio Cavalry |
| Second Division; BG Kenner Garrard | 3rd (Lightning) Brigade Col Abram Miller | 98th Illinois Mounted Infantry; 123rd Illinois Mounted Infantry; 17th Indiana Mounted Infantry; 72nd Indiana Mounted Infantry |
| Second Division; BG Kenner Garrard | Artillery | Chicago Board of Trade Battery |
| Third Division; BG Judson Kilpatrick | 1st Brigade Ltc Robert Klein | 3rd Indiana Cavalry (four companies); 5th Iowa Cavalry (from July 27) |
| Third Division; BG Judson Kilpatrick | 2nd Brigade Maj Thomas Sanderson; Ltc Fielder Jones | 8th Indiana Cavalry (from July 27); 2nd Kentucky Cavalry (from July 27); 10th Ohio Cavalry |
| Third Division; BG Judson Kilpatrick | 3rd Brigade Col Eli Murray | 92nd Illinois Mounted Infantry; 3rd Kentucky Cavalry; 5th Kentucky Cavalry |
| Third Division; BG Judson Kilpatrick | Artillery | 10th Wisconsin Battery |

=== Army of the Tennessee ===
MG James B. McPherson (k July 22)
MG John A. Logan
MG Oliver O. Howard
Escort: 4th Company Ohio Cavalry, B Company, 1st Ohio Cavalry

==== XV Corps ====
MG John A. Logan
BG Morgan L. Smith

| Division | Brigade | Regiments and others |
|---|---|---|
| First Division; BG Charles R. Woods; MG Peter J. Osterhaus | 1st Brigade Col Milo Smith; BG Charles R. Woods | 26th Iowa; 30th Iowa; 27th Missouri; 76th Ohio |
| First Division; BG Charles R. Woods; MG Peter J. Osterhaus | 2nd Brigade Col James A. Williamson | 4th Iowa; 9th Iowa; 25th Iowa; 31st Iowa |
| First Division; BG Charles R. Woods; MG Peter J. Osterhaus | 3rd Brigade Col Hugo Wangelin | 3rd Missouri; 12th Missouri; 17th Missouri; 29th Missouri; 31st Missouri; 32nd Missouri |
| First Division; BG Charles R. Woods; MG Peter J. Osterhaus | Artillery Maj Clemens Landgraeber | Battery F, 2nd Missouri Light; 4th Ohio Light Battery |
| Second Division; BG Morgan L. Smith; BG Joseph Lightburn; BG William Hazen | 1st Brigade BG Giles A. Smith; Col James Martin; Col Theodore Jones | 55th Illinois; 111th Illinois (until August 4); 116th Illinois; 127th Illinois; 6th Missouri; Company K, 8th Missouri; 30th Ohio (from August 4); 57th Ohio |
| Second Division; BG Morgan L. Smith; BG Joseph Lightburn; BG William Hazen | 2nd Brigade BG Joseph Lightburn (w August 24); Col Wells Jones | 83rd Indiana; 30th Ohio (until August 4); 37th Ohio; 47th Ohio; 53rd Ohio; 54th Ohio |
| Second Division; BG Morgan L. Smith; BG Joseph Lightburn; BG William Hazen | Artillery Cpt Francis De Gress | Battery A, 1st Illinois Light; Battery H, 1st Illinois Light |
| Third Division; BG John E. Smith | 1st Brigade Col Jesse I. Alexander; Col Joseph McCown | 63rd Illinois; 93rd Illinois (from mid-August); 48th Indiana; 59th Indiana; 4th Minnesota; 18th Wisconsin |
| Third Division; BG John E. Smith | 2nd Brigade Col Green B. Raum | 13th Illinois (detachment); 56th Illinois; 10th Iowa (from mid-August); 17th Iowa; 10th Missouri; 24th Missouri (one company); 26th Missouri (from mid-August); 80th Ohio |
| Third Division; BG John E. Smith | 3rd Brigade Col Jabez Banbury; Col Benjamin Dean | 93rd Illinois; 10th Iowa; 26th Missouri |
| Third Division; BG John E. Smith | Artillery Cpt Henry Dillon | Wisconsin Light Artillery, 6th Battery; Wisconsin Light Artillery, 12th Battery |
| Third Division; BG John E. Smith | Cavalry | 5th Ohio Cavalry; Company F, 4th Missouri Cavalry (Escort to BG John E. Smith) |
| Fourth Division; BG William Harrow | 1st Brigade Colonel Reuben Williams; Col John M. Oliver | 26th Illinois; 48th Illinois (from August 4); 90th Illinois; 12th Indiana; 99th Indiana (from August 4); 100th Indiana (until August 4); 15th Michigan (from August 4); 70th Ohio (from August 4) |
| Fourth Division; BG William Harrow | 2nd Brigade BG Charles C. Walcutt | 40th Illinois; 103rd Illinois; 97th Indiana; 100th Indiana (from August 4); 6th Iowa; 46th Ohio |
| Fourth Division; BG William Harrow | 3rd Brigade Col John M. Oliver | 48th Illinois; 99th Indiana; 15th Michigan; 70th Ohio |
| Fourth Division; BG William Harrow | Artillery Maj John T. Cheney; Cpt Henry Griffiths; Cpt Josiah Burton | Battery F, 1st Illinois Light; 1st Iowa Light Battery |

==== XVI Corps ====
MG Grenville M. Dodge (w August 19)
BG Thomas E. G. Ransom Escort: Company A, 52nd Illinois

| Division | Brigade | Regiments and others |
|---|---|---|
| Second Division; BG Thomas W. Sweeny; BG Elliott W. Rice; BG John M. Corse | 1st Brigade BG Elliott W. Rice | 52nd Illinois; 66th Indiana; 2nd Iowa; 7th Iowa |
| Second Division; BG Thomas W. Sweeny; BG Elliott W. Rice; BG John M. Corse | 2nd Brigade Col August Mersy; Col Robert N. Adams | 9th Illinois Mounted Infantry; 12th Illinois; 66th Illinois (Western Sharpshooters); 81st Ohio |
| Second Division; BG Thomas W. Sweeny; BG Elliott W. Rice; BG John M. Corse | 3rd Brigade Col Henry J. B. Cummings; Col Richard Rowett | 7th Illinois; 50th Illinois; 57th Illinois; 39th Iowa |
| Second Division; BG Thomas W. Sweeny; BG Elliott W. Rice; BG John M. Corse | Artillery Cpt Frederick Welker | Battery B, 1st Michigan Light; Battery H, 1st Missouri Light |
| Fourth Division; BG James C. Veatch; BG John W. Fuller; BG Thomas E. G. Ransom | 1st Brigade BG John W. Fuller; Col John Morill (w July 22); Ltc Henry McDowell | 64th Illinois; 18th Missouri; 27th Ohio; 39th Ohio |
| Fourth Division; BG James C. Veatch; BG John W. Fuller; BG Thomas E. G. Ransom | 2nd Brigade BG John W. Sprague | 35th New Jersey; 43rd Ohio; 63rd Ohio; 25th Wisconsin |
| Fourth Division; BG James C. Veatch; BG John W. Fuller; BG Thomas E. G. Ransom | 3rd Brigade Col James H. Howe; Col William T.C. Grower; Col John Tillson | 10th Illinois (from August 20); 25th Indiana; 17th New York Veteran (until August 20); 32nd Wisconsin |
| Fourth Division; BG James C. Veatch; BG John W. Fuller; BG Thomas E. G. Ransom | Artillery Cpt George Robinson | Battery C, 1st Michigan Light; 14th Ohio Light Battery; Battery F, 2nd United States |

==== XVII Corps ====
MG Francis P. Blair Jr.
Escort: Company G, 9th Illinois Mounted Infantry; Company G, 11th Illinois Cavalry

| Division | Brigade | Regiments and others |
|---|---|---|
| Third Division; BG Mortimer D. Leggett | 1st Brigade BG Manning F. Force (w July 22); Col George E. Bryant | 20th Illinois; 30th Illinois; 31st Illinois; 45th Illinois; 12th Wisconsin; 16th Wisconsin |
| Third Division; BG Mortimer D. Leggett | 2nd Brigade Col Robert K. Scott; Ltc Greenberry Wiles | 20th Ohio; 68th Ohio; 78th Ohio |
| Third Division; BG Mortimer D. Leggett | 3rd Brigade Col Adam G. Malloy | 17th Wisconsin; Worden's Battalion |
| Third Division; BG Mortimer D. Leggett | Artillery Cpt William S. Williams | Battery D, 1st Illinois Light; Battery H, 1st Michigan Light; 3rd Ohio Light Battery |
| Fourth Division; BG Walter Q. Gresham (w July 20); Col William Hall; BG Giles A. Smith | 1st Brigade Col Benjamin Potts | 53rd Illinois; 23rd Indiana; 53rd Indiana; 3rd Iowa (3 companies); 32nd Ohio |
| Fourth Division; BG Walter Q. Gresham (w July 20); Col William Hall; BG Giles A. Smith | 2nd Brigade Col John Logan | 14th and 15th Illinois; 32nd Illinois; 41st Illinois (two companies) |
| Fourth Division; BG Walter Q. Gresham (w July 20); Col William Hall; BG Giles A. Smith | 3rd Brigade Col William Hall; Col John Shane; BG William W. Belknap | 11th Iowa; 13th Iowa; 15th Iowa; 16th Iowa |
| Fourth Division; BG Walter Q. Gresham (w July 20); Col William Hall; BG Giles A. Smith | Artillery Cpt Edward Spear | Battery F, 2nd Illinois Light; 1st Minnesota Light Battery; Battery C, 1st Missouri Light; 10th Ohio Light Battery; 15th Ohio Light Battery |

=== Army of the Ohio (XXIII Corps) ===
MG John M. Schofield
Escort: Company G, 7th Ohio Cavalry

| Division | Brigade | Regiments and others |
|---|---|---|
| Second Division; BG Milo S. Hascall | 1st Brigade BG Joseph A. Cooper | 91st Indiana (until August 11); 130th Indiana (from August 11); 14th Kentucky (from August 11); 25th Michigan; 99th Ohio (from August 11); 3rd Tennessee: Maj Rhadamanthus Dunn; 6th Tennessee |
| Second Division; BG Milo S. Hascall | 2nd Brigade Col William E. Hobson; Col John R. Bond | 107th Illinois; 80th Indiana; 129th Indiana (from August 11); 13th Kentucky; 23rd Michigan; 111th Ohio; 118th Ohio |
| Second Division; BG Milo S. Hascall | 3rd Brigade Col Silas A. Strickland | 91st Indiana (from August 11); 123rd Indiana (from August 11); 14th Kentucky (until August 11); 20th Kentucky; 27th Kentucky; 50th Ohio |
| Second Division; BG Milo S. Hascall | 4th Brigade Col Peter T. Swaine | 123rd Indiana; 129th Indiana; 130th Indiana; 99th Ohio |
| Second Division; BG Milo S. Hascall | Artillery Cpt Joseph C. Shields | 22nd Indiana Light Battery; Battery F, 1st Michigan Light; 19th Ohio Light Battery |
| Third Division; BG Jacob D. Cox | 1st Brigade BG James W. Reilly | 112th Illinois (until August 11); 11th Kentucky (from August 11); 12th Kentucky (from August 11); 16th Kentucky; 100th Ohio; 104th Ohio; 8th Tennessee |
| Third Division; BG Jacob D. Cox | 2nd Brigade Col Daniel Cameron; Col John S. Casement | 65th Illinois; 63rd Indiana (until August 11); 65th Indiana; 124th Indiana (from August 11); 24th Kentucky; 103rd Ohio |
| Third Division; BG Jacob D. Cox | 3rd Brigade Col Israel Stiles | 112th Illinois (from August 11); 63rd Indiana (from August 11); 120th Indiana (from August 11); 128th Indiana (from August 11); 11th Kentucky; 12th Kentucky; 1st Tennessee (until August 11); 5th Tennessee (until August 11) |
| Third Division; BG Jacob D. Cox | 4th Brigade Col Richard F. Barter | 120th Indiana; 124th Indiana; 128th Indiana |
| Third Division; BG Jacob D. Cox | Dismounted Cavalry Col Eugene Crittenden | 16th Illinois Cavalry; 12th Kentucky Cavalry |
| Third Division; BG Jacob D. Cox | Artillery Maj Henry W. Wells | 15th Indiana Light Battery; 23rd Indiana Light Battery; Battery D, 1st Ohio Light |
| Stoneman's Cavalry Division; MG George Stoneman; Col Horace Capron | 1st Brigade Col Israel Garrard | 9th Michigan Cavalry; 7th Ohio Cavalry |
| Stoneman's Cavalry Division; MG George Stoneman; Col Horace Capron | 2nd Brigade Col James Biddle; Col Thomas H. Butler | 5th Indiana Cavalry; 6th Indiana Cavalry |
| Stoneman's Cavalry Division; MG George Stoneman; Col Horace Capron | 3rd Brigade Col Horace Capron | 14th Illinois Cavalry; 8th Michigan Cavalry; McLaughlin's Ohio Squadron |
| Stoneman's Cavalry Division; MG George Stoneman; Col Horace Capron | Independent Brigade Col Alexander Holeman | 1st Kentucky Cavalry; 11th Kentucky Cavalry |
| Stoneman's Cavalry Division; MG George Stoneman; Col Horace Capron | Artillery | 24th Indiana Light Battery |
| Cavalry Division; Col Israel Garrard | Mounted Brigade Col George Acker; Col William Hamilton | 9th Michigan Cavalry; 7th Ohio Cavalry; McLaughlin's Ohio Squadron; 24th Indiana Light Battery |
| Cavalry Division; Col Israel Garrard | Dismounted Brigade Col Horace Capron | 14th Illinois Cavalry; 16th Illinois Cavalry; 5th Indiana Cavalry; 6th Indiana Cavalry; 12th Kentucky Cavalry |

== Strengths ==
The following table shows total strengths of each of the major formations at several stages throughout the campaign.

| Army | Corps | April 30 | May 31 | June 30 | July 31 | August 31 |
|---|---|---|---|---|---|---|
| Army of the Cumberland | IV Corps | 20,538 | 17,227 | 14,956 | 13,519 | 12,118 |
| Army of the Cumberland | XIV Corps | 22,696 | 23,448 | 19,607 | 18,014 | 15,249 |
| Army of the Cumberland | XX Corps | 20,721 | 16,801 | 14,672 | 12,578 | 12,413 |
| Army of the Cumberland | Cavalry Corps | 8,983 | 9,848 | 9,477 | 8,427 | 7,638 |
| Army of the Cumberland | Total | 72,938 | 67,324 | 58,712 | 52,538 | 47,418 |
| Army of the Tennessee | XV Corps | 12,517 | 12,497 | 11,788 | 9,133 | 8,670 |
| Army of the Tennessee | XVI Corps | 11,863 | 10,361 | 10,744 | 9,345 | 7,818 |
| Army of the Tennessee | XVII Corps | - | 9,775 | 9,262 | 6,800 | 5,935 |
| Army of the Tennessee | Total | 34,155 | 32,633 | 31,794 | 25,278 | 22,423 |
| Army of the Ohio | XXIII Corps | 9,854 | 9,971 | 12,906 | 11,960 | 9,981 |
| Army of the Ohio | Cavalry Division | 2,951 | 2,886 | 2,658 | 1,899 | 1,936 |
| Army of the Ohio | Total | 12,805 | 12,857 | 15,564 | 13,859 | 11,917 |
| Military Division of the Mississippi | Grand Total | 110,123 | 112,814 | 106,070 | 91,675 | 81,758 |
