= Battle of Franklin order of battle: Union =

The following Union Army units and commanders fought in the Battle of Franklin of the American Civil War on November 30, 1864. Order of battle compiled from the army organization during the campaign. The Confederate order of battle is shown separately.

== Abbreviations used ==
=== Military rank ===
- MG = Major General
- BG = Brigadier General
- Col = Colonel
- Ltc = Lieutenant Colonel
- Cpt = Captain
- Bvt = Brevet

=== Other ===
- k = killed
- mw = mortally wounded
- w = wounded

== Army of the Ohio ==
MG John M. Schofield

=== IV Corps ===
MG David S. Stanley (w)

Division	Brigade	Regiments and Others
First Division BG Nathan Kimball	1st Brigade Col Isaac M. Kirby (K-2, W-8, M-4 =14)	21st Illinois: Cpt William H. Jamison; 38th Illinois: Cpt Andrew M. Pollard; 31st Indiana: Col John T. Smith; 81st Indiana: Maj Edward G. Mathey; 90th Ohio: Ltc Samuel N. Yeoman; 101st Ohio: Ltc Bedan B. McDanald
First Division BG Nathan Kimball	2nd Brigade BG Walter C. Whitaker (K-0, W-5, M-4 =9)	96th Illinois: Maj George Hicks; 115th Illinois: Col Jesse Hale Moore; 35th Indiana: Ltc Augustus G. Tassin; 21st Kentucky: Ltc James C. Evans; 23rd Kentucky: Ltc George W. Northup; 40th Ohio (six companies): Ltc James Watson; 45th Ohio: Ltc John H. Humphrey; 51st Ohio: Ltc Charles H. Wood
First Division BG Nathan Kimball	3rd Brigade BG William Grose (K-3, W-24, M-10 =37)	75th Illinois: Col John E. Bennett; 80th Illinois: Cpt James Cunningham; 84th Illinois: Ltc Charles H. Morton; 9th Indiana: Col Isaac C. B. Suman; 30th Indiana (three companies): Cpt Henry W. Lawton; 36th Indiana (one company): Lt John P. Swisher; 84th Indiana: Maj John C. Taylor; 77th Pennsylvania: Col Thomas E. Rose
Second Division BG George D. Wagner	1st Brigade Col Emerson Opdycke (K-16, W-125, M-65 =206)	36th Illinois: Ltc Porter C. Olson (k), Maj Levi P. Holden; 44th Illinois: Ltc John Russell; 73rd Illinois: Maj Thomas W. Motherspaw (mw); 74th/88th Illinois: Ltc George W. Smith; 125th Ohio: Cpt Edward P. Bates; 24th Wisconsin: Cpt Edwin B. Parsons
Second Division BG George D. Wagner	2nd Brigade Col John Quincy Lane (K-29, W-269, M-340 =638)	100th Illinois: Ltc Charles M. Hammond; 40th Indiana: Ltc Henry Leaming; 57th Indiana: Maj John S. McGraw; 28th Kentucky: Ltc J. Rowan Boone; 26th Ohio: Cpt William Clark; 97th Ohio: Ltc Milton Barnes
Second Division BG George D. Wagner	3rd Brigade Col Joseph Conrad (K-7, W-125, M-265 =397)	42nd Illinois: Maj Frederick A. Atwater; 51st Illinois: Cpt Merritt B. Atwater; 79th Illinois: Col Allen Buckner; 15th Missouri: Cpt George Ernst; 64th Ohio: Ltc Robert C. Brown; 65th Ohio: Maj Orlow Smith
Third Division BG Thomas J. Wood	1st Brigade Col Abel D. Streight	89th Illinois: Ltc William D. Williams; 51st Indiana: Cpt William W. Scearce; 8th Kansas: Ltc John Conover; 15th Ohio: Col Frank Askew; 49th Ohio: Maj Luther M. Strong
Third Division BG Thomas J. Wood	2nd Brigade Col Philip S. Post	59th Illinois: Maj James M. Stookey; 41st Ohio: Ltc Robert L. Kimberly; 71st Ohio: Col Henry K. McConnell; 93rd Ohio: Ltc Daniel Bowman; 124th Ohio: Ltc James Pickands
Third Division BG Thomas J. Wood	3rd Brigade Col Frederick Knefler	79th Indiana: Ltc George W. Parker; 86th Indiana: Col George F. Dick; 13th Ohio (battalion): Maj Joseph T. Snider; 19th Ohio: Ltc Henry G. Stratton; 17th Kentucky: Col A. M. Stout; 40th Missouri: Col Samuel A. Holmes
	Artillery Cpt Lyman Bridges	Bridges' Illinois Battery: Lt Lyman A. White; 1st Kentucky Battery: Cpt Theodore S. Thomasson; Battery A, 1st Ohio Light: Lt Charles W. Scovill; Battery G, 1st Ohio Light: Cpt Alexander Marshall; 6th Ohio Battery: Lt Aaron P. Baldwin; 20th Ohio Battery: Lt John S. Burdick (mw); Battery B, Pennsylvania Light: Cpt Jacob Ziegler; Battery M, 4th U.S. Light: Lt Samuel Canby

=== XXIII Corps ===
BG Jacob D. Cox

Division	Brigade	Regiments and Others
Second Division BG Thomas H. Ruger	1st Brigade BG Joseph A. Cooper	130th Indiana: Col Charles S. Parrish; 25th Michigan: Ltc Benjamin F. Orcutt; 99th Ohio: Ltc John E. Cummins; 3rd Tennessee: Col William Cross; 6th Tennessee (7 cos.): Ltc Edward Maynard
Second Division BG Thomas H. Ruger	2nd Brigade Col Orlando H. Moore (K-21, W-89, M-12 =122)	107th Illinois: Col Francis H. Lowry (mw); 80th Indiana: Ltc Alfred D. Owen; 129th Indiana: Col Charles A. Zollinger; 23rd Michigan: Col Oliver L. Spaulding; 111th Ohio: Ltc Isaac R. Sherwood; 118th Ohio: Maj Edgar Sowers
Second Division BG Thomas H. Ruger	3rd Brigade Col Silas Strickland (K-73, W-178, M-280 =531)	72nd Illinois: Ltc Joseph Stockton; 44th Missouri: Col Robert C. Bradshaw (w); 50th Ohio: Ltc Hamilton S. Gillespie; 183rd Ohio: Col George W. Hoge
Second Division BG Thomas H. Ruger	Artillery	22nd Indiana Light: Cpt Edward W. Nicholson; Battery F, 1st Michigan Light: Cpt Byron D. Paddock; 19th Ohio Battery: Lt Frank Wilson
Third Division BG James W. Reilly	1st Brigade BG James W. Reilly (K-33, W-130, M-70 =233)	12th Kentucky: Ltc Laurence H. Rousseau; 16th Kentucky: Ltc John S. White; 100th Ohio: Ltc Edwin L. Hayes; 104th Ohio: Col Oscar W. Sterl; 175th Ohio: Ltc Daniel W. McCoy; 8th Tennessee: Cpt James W. Berry
Third Division BG James W. Reilly	2nd Brigade Col John S. Casement (K-3, W-16, M-0 =19)	65th Illinois: Ltc W. Scott Stewart; 65th Indiana: Ltc John W. Hammond; 124th Indiana: Col John M. Orr; 103rd Ohio: Cpt Henry S. Pickands; 5th Tennessee: Maj David G. Bowers
Third Division BG James W. Reilly	3rd Brigade Col Israel N. Stiles (K-11, W-51, M-21 =83)	112th Illinois: Ltc Emery S. Bond; 63rd Indiana: Ltc Daniel Morris; 120th Indiana: Col Allen W. Prather; 128th Indiana: Ltc Jasper Packard
Third Division BG James W. Reilly	Artillery	15th Indiana Light: Cpt Alonzo D. Harvey; 23rd Indiana Light: Lt Aaron A. Wilbur; Battery D, 1st Ohio Light: Cpt Giles J. Cockerill

=== Cavalry Corps ===
MG James H. Wilson

Escort:

- 4th U.S. Cavalry: Lt Joseph Hedges

Division	Brigade	Regiments and Others
First Division BG Edward M. McCook	1st Brigade BG John T. Croxton	8th Iowa Cavalry: Col Joseph B. Dorr; 4th Kentucky Mounted Infantry: Col Robert M. Kelly; 2nd Michigan Cavalry: Col Benjamin Smith; 1st Tennessee Cavalry: Ltc Calvin M. Dyer
Fifth Division BG Edward Hatch	1st Brigade Col Robert R. Stewart	3rd Illinois Cavalry: Ltc Robert H. Carnahan; 11th Indiana Cavalry: Ltc Abram Sharra; 12th Missouri: Col Oliver Wells; 10th Tennessee: Maj William P. Story
Fifth Division BG Edward Hatch	2nd Brigade Col Datus E. Coon	2nd Iowa Cavalry: Maj Charles C. Horton; 6th Illinois Cavalry: Ltc John Lynch; 7th Illinois Cavalry: Maj John M. Graham; 9th Illinois Cavalry: Cpt Joseph W. Harper; 12th Tennessee Cavalry: Col George Spalding; Battery K, 1st Illinois Light: Lt Isaac W. Curtis
Sixth Division BG Richard W. Johnson	1st Brigade Col Horace Capron	16th Illinois Cavalry: Maj Charles H. Beeres; 5th Iowa Cavalry: Maj J. Morris Young; 7th Ohio Cavalry: Col Israel Garrard
Sixth Division BG Richard W. Johnson	2nd Brigade Col James Biddle	14th Illinois Cavalry: Maj Francis M. Davidson; 6th Indiana Cavalry: Maj Jacob S. Stephens; 8th Michigan Cavalry: Ltc Grover S. Wormer; 3rd Tennessee: Maj Benjamin Cunningham

== See also ==
- U.S. War Department, The War of the Rebellion: a Compilation of the Official Records of the Union and Confederate Armies, U.S. Government Printing Office, 1880–1901.
