= Battle of Wyse Fork order of battle: Union =

The following is the organization of the Union forces engaged at the Battle of Wyse Fork, during the American Civil War in 1865. The Confederate order of battle is listed separately.

== Abbreviations used ==
=== Military Rank ===
- MG = Major General
- BG = Brigadier General
- Col = Colonel
- Ltc = Lieutenant Colonel
- Maj = Major
- Cpt = Captain
- Lt = Lieutenant
- Bvt = Brevet

=== Other ===
- w = wounded
- mw = mortally wounded
- k = killed
- c = captured

== Department of North Carolina ==
Major General John M. Schofield

=== District of Beaufort/Cox's Provisional Corps ===
Major General Jacob D. Cox

- Aide-de-Camp BG George S. Greene
- Aide-de-Camp Bvt BG Israel N. Stiles

Division	Brigade	Regiments and Others
1st Division (XXIII Corps); BG Thomas H. Ruger	1st Brigade Col John M. Orr	120th Indiana; 124th Indiana; 128th Indiana; 180th Ohio
1st Division (XXIII Corps); BG Thomas H. Ruger	2nd Brigade Col John C. McQuiston	123rd Indiana; 129th Indiana; 130th Indiana; 28th Michigan
1st Division (XXIII Corps); BG Thomas H. Ruger	3rd Brigade Bvt BG Minor T. Thomas	8th Minnesota: Ltc Henry C. Rogers; 174th Ohio: Col John Sills Jones; 178th Ohio: Col Joab A. Stafford
1st Division (XXIII Corps); BG Thomas H. Ruger	Artillery	Co. F, 1st Michigan Light Artillery
1st Division (Dist. of Beaufort); BG Innis N. Palmer	1st Brigade BG Edward Harland	9th New Jersey: Col James Stewart, Jr.; 23rd Massachusetts: Col John W. Raymond; 2nd Massachusetts Heavy Artillery (serving as infantry)
1st Division (Dist. of Beaufort); BG Innis N. Palmer	2nd Brigade Col Peter J. Claassen	132nd New York; Battalion of provisional troops, convalescents
1st Division (Dist. of Beaufort); BG Innis N. Palmer	3rd Brigade Col Horace Boughton	18th Wisconsin; Battalion of provisional troops; Battalion of provisional troops
1st Division (Dist. of Beaufort); BG Innis N. Palmer	Artillery	Batteries C & D, 3rd New York Light Artillery
2nd Division (District of Beaufort); BG Samuel P. Carter	1st Brigade Col Adam Gale Malloy	85th New York; Battalion of provisional troops; Battalion of provisional troops
2nd Division (District of Beaufort); BG Samuel P. Carter	2nd Brigade Col Charles L. Upham	15th Connecticut; 27th Massachusetts
2nd Division (District of Beaufort); BG Samuel P. Carter	3rd Brigade Ltc Henry Splaine	17th Massachusetts; 25th Massachusetts
2nd Division (District of Beaufort); BG Samuel P. Carter	Artillery	Batteries A, I & G, 3rd New York Light Artillery
2nd Division (District of Beaufort); BG Samuel P. Carter	Cavalry	12th New York Cavalry; Independent Troop, North Carolina Cavalry
