= 91st Indiana Infantry Regiment =

91st Regiment Indiana Infantry
- Active: October 1, 1862 – June 26, 1865
- Country: United States
- Allegiance: Union
- Branch: Infantry
- Engagements: Atlanta campaign Battle of Kennesaw Mountain; Siege of Atlanta; Battle of Lovejoy's Station; Battle of Spring Hill; Second Battle of Franklin; Battle of Nashville; Carolinas campaign

The 91st Regiment Indiana Infantry was an infantry regiment that served in the Union Army during the American Civil War between October 1862 and June 1865.

== Service ==
The 91st Indiana Infantry was initially organized as a battalion of seven companies and mustered in at Evansville, Indiana for a three-year enlistment on October 1, 1862, under the command of Lieutenant Colonel John Mehringer. Companies H, G, and K were organized in September 1863 and attached to the regiment.

The regiment was attached to District of Western Kentucky, Department of the Ohio, to June 1863. 1st Brigade, 2nd Division, XXIII Corps, Army of the Ohio, to August 1863. Russellville, Kentucky, 1st Division, XXIII Corps, to October 1863. District of Southwest Kentucky, Department of the Ohio, October 1863. District of Somerset, Kentucky, 1st Division, XXIII Corps, to January 1864. District of the Clinch, Department of the Ohio, to April 1864. 1st Brigade, 4th Division, XXIII Corps, to June 1864. 1st Brigade, 2nd Division, XXIII Corps, to August 1864. 3rd Brigade, 2nd Division, XXIII Corps, Army of the Ohio, to February 1865, and Department of North Carolina, to June 1865.

The 91st Indiana Infantry mustered out of service on June 21, 1865. Recruits were transferred to the 120th Indiana Infantry, 124th Indiana Infantry, and 128th Indiana Infantry.

== Detailed service ==
Left Indiana for Henderson, Kentucky, October 10. Duty at Henderson, Madisonville, and Smithlands, Kentucky, until June 1863. Pursuit of Morgan to Burkesville June 15–23. Duty at Russellville until September 25. Companies G, H, and K joined the regiment at Russellville. Ordered to Nashville, Tennessee, September 25. Duty at Nashville, Camp Nelson, Kentucky, and Camp Burnside, Kentucky, until January 1864. At Cumberland Gap January to May 1864. Wyerman's Mills February 22, 1864 (Company A). Cumberland Gap February 22 (detachment). March to Kingston, Georgia, May 17-June 3, then to Ackworth, Georgia. Atlanta Campaign June 8-September 8. Operations about Marietta and against Kennesaw Mountain June 10-July 2. Lost Mountain June 15–17. Muddy Creek June 17. Noyes Creek June 19. Kolb's Farm June 22. Assault on Kennesaw June 27. Chattahoochie River July 3–17. Decatur July 19. Howard House July 20. Siege of Atlanta July 22-August 25. October 27 to December 5. Moved to Memphis, Tennessee, Flank movement on Jonesborough August 25–30. Battle of Jonesborough August 31-September 1. Lovejoy's Station September 2–6. Operations against Hood in northern Georgia and northern Alabama September 29-November 3. Nashville Campaign November–December. Columbia, Duck River, November 24–27. Spring Hill November 29. Battle of Franklin November 30. Battle of Nashville December 15–16. Pursuit of Hood to the Tennessee River December 17–23. Duty at Clifton, Tennessee, until January 16, 1865. Movement to Washington, D.C., then to Fort Fisher, North Carolina, January 16-February 9. Operations against Hoke February 11–14. Fort Anderson February 18–19. Town Creek February 19–20. Capture of Wilmington February 22. Carolinas Campaign March 1-April 26. Advance on Goldsboro March 6–21. Capture of Goldsboro March 21. Advance on Raleigh April 10–14. Occupation of Raleigh April 14. Bennett's House April 26. Surrender of Johnston and his army. Duty at Raleigh until May 3 and at Salisbury until June 26.

== Casualties ==
The regiment lost a total of 136 men during service; 2 officers and 18 enlisted men killed or mortally wounded, 2 officers and 114 enlisted men died of disease.

== Commanders ==
- Colonel John Mehringer - promoted from lieutenant colonel September 12, 1863

== See also ==
- List of Indiana Civil War regiments
- Indiana in the Civil War
