= Battle of Wyse Fork order of battle =

The order of battle for the Battle of Wyse Fork includes:

- Battle of Wyse Fork order of battle: Confederate
- Battle of Wyse Fork order of battle: Union
