= 11th Kentucky Infantry Regiment =

- Active: December 9, 1861, to December 16, 1864
- Country: United States
- Allegiance: Union
- Branch: Infantry
- Engagements: Battle of Shiloh; Siege of Corinth; Battle of Perryville; Battle of Stones River; Knoxville Campaign; Battle of Kennesaw Mountain; Battle of Peachtree Creek; Siege of Atlanta; Battle of Jonesboro; Battle of Lovejoy's Station

The 11th Kentucky Infantry Regiment was an infantry regiment that served in the Union Army during the American Civil War.

== Service attachments ==
The 11th Kentucky Infantry Regiment was organized at Camp Calhoun in Calhoun, Kentucky, and mustered in for a three-year enlistment on December 9, 1861, under the command of Colonel Pierce Butler Hawkins.

The regiment was attached to a series of larger units over the course of the war:

- 14th Brigade, Army of the Ohio, December 1861
- 14th Brigade, 5th Division, Army of the Ohio.
- 14th Brigade, 5th Division, II Corps, Army of the Ohio, September 1862
- 1st Brigade, 3rd Division, Left Wing, XIV Corps, Army of the Cumberland, November 1862
- 1st Brigade, 3rd Division, XXI Corps, Army of the Cumberland, January 1863
- District of Western Kentucky, Department of the Ohio, April 1863
- 3rd Brigade, 3rd Division, XXIII Corps, Army of the Ohio, June 1863
- Unattached, in Bowling Green, Kentucky, 1st Division, XXIII Corps, August 1863
- 1st Brigade, 4th Division, XXIII Corps, October 1863
- 3rd Brigade, 1st Division, Cavalry Corps, Department of the Ohio, November 1863
- 3rd Brigade, 4th Division, XXIII Corps, April 1864
- 3rd Brigade, 3rd Division, XXIII Corps, June 1864
- 1st Brigade, 3rd Division, XXIII Corps, August 1864 to December 1864.

The 11th Kentucky Infantry mustered out of service on December 16, 1864.

== Service details ==
The unit was involved in major and minor engagements from 1862 through 1864.

=== 1861 ===
- Duty at Calhoun, Ky., until February 1862.

=== 1862 ===
- Advance on Bowling Green, Ky., and Nashville, Tenn., February 10–25.
- Occupation of Nashville February 25.
- March to Savannah, Tenn., March 17-April 6.
- Battle of Shiloh April 7.
- Advance on and siege of Corinth, Miss., April 29-May 30.
- Buell's Campaign in northern Alabama and middle Tennessee June to August.
- March to Louisville, Ky., in pursuit of Bragg August 21-September 26.
- Pursuit of Bragg into Kentucky October 1–20.
- Battle of Perryville, Ky., October 8 (reserve).
- Nelson's Cross Roads and Rural Hill October 18.
- March to Nashville, Tenn., October 20-November 7, and duty there until December 26.
- Advance on Murfreesboro December 26–30.
- Nolensville December 26–27.
- Battle of Stones River December 30–31, 1862 and January 1–3, 1863.
- 1863
- Ordered to Kentucky January 8, 1863. Duty at Bowling Green, Ky., until July. Regiment mounted and operating against guerrillas.
- Expedition to Tennessee state line May 2–6.
- Woodburn and South Union May 13.
- At Glasgow, Ky., July to September.
- March to Knoxville, Tenn., and Burnside's Campaign in eastern Tennessee September to November.
- Philadelphia October 24.
- Leiper's Ferry, Holston River, October 27.
- Knoxville Campaign November 4 to December 23.
- Rockford and near Loudon November 14.
- Lenoir Station, Stock Creek and Holston River November 15.
- Near Knoxville November 16.
- Siege of Knoxville November 17-December 5.
- About Bean's Station December 9–13.
- Russellville December 10.
- Bean's Station December 13, 14 and 15.
- Rutledge December 16.
- Blain's Cross Roads December 16–19.
- Scout to Bean's Station December 29–30.
- 1864
- About Dandridge January 26–28, 1864.
- Fair Garden January 27.
- Moved to Mt. Sterling, Ky., February 1864.
- Dismounted and marched to Knoxville, Tenn. Duty there and at crossing of the Hiawassee operating against Wheeler and guarding Sherman's communications until June.
- Joined Sherman at Kingston, Ga. Operations about Marietta and against Kennesaw Mountain June 10-July 2.
- Lost Mountain June 15–17.
- Muddy Creek June 17.
- Noyes Creek June 19.
- Cheyney's Farm June 22.
- Olley's Creek June 26–27.
- Assault on Kennesaw June 27.
- Nickajack Creek July 2–5.
- Chattahoochie River July 6–17.
- Peachtree Creek July 19–20.
- Siege of Atlanta July 22-August 25.
- Utoy Creek August 5–7.
- Flank movement on Jonesboro August 25–30.
- Battle of Jonesboro August 31-September 1.
- Lovejoy's Station September 2–6.
- Operations against Hood in northern Georgia and northern Alabama October 1–26.
- Moved to Nashville, thence to Pulaski, Tenn.
- Ordered to Louisville, Ky., November 14; thence to Bowling Green, Ky., and duty there until December.

== Casualties ==
The regiment lost a total of 264 men; 2 officers and 45 enlisted men were killed or mortally wounded, while 3 officers and 214 enlisted men died of disease.

== Commanders ==
- Colonel Pierce Butler Hawkins
- Colonel S. P. Love
- Major Erasmus L. Mottley

== See also ==
- List of Kentucky Civil War Units
- Kentucky in the Civil War
