= 178th Ohio Infantry Regiment =

- Active: September 26, 1864, to June 29, 1865
- Country: United States
- Allegiance: Union
- Branch: Infantry
- Engagements: Carolinas campaign Battle of Wyse Fork

The 178th Ohio Infantry Regiment, sometimes 178th Ohio Volunteer Infantry (or 178th OVI) was an infantry regiment in the Union Army during the American Civil War.

== Service ==
The 178th Ohio Infantry was organized at Camp Chase in Columbus, Ohio, and mustered in for one year service on September 26, 1864, under the command of Colonel Joab Arwin Stafford.

The regiment was attached to the Defenses Nashville & Chattanooga Railroad, Department of the Cumberland, to January 1865. 3rd Brigade, 1st Division, XXIII Corps, Army of the Ohio, and Department of North Carolina, to June 1865.

The 178th Ohio Infantry mustered out of service June 29, 1865, at Charlotte, North Carolina, and was discharged July 7, 1865.

== Detailed service ==
Left Ohio for Nashville, Tenn., October 8. Duty at Nashville, Tenn., until October 22, 1864. and at Tullahoma, Tenn., until November 30. Moved to Murfreesboro, Tenn., November 30-December 2. Siege of Murfreesboro December 5–12. Wilkinson's Cross Roads, near Murfreesboro, "The Cedars," December 7. Wilkinson's Pike, near Murfreesboro, December 13–14. Ordered to Clifton, Tenn., and duty there until January 16, 1865. Movement to Washington, D.C., January 16–29, and to Fort Fisher, N.C., February 21–23; to Morehead City February 24, then to New Berne February 25. Campaign of the Carolinas March 1-April 26. Advance on Kingston and Goldsboro March 6–21. Battle of Wyse Fork March 8–10. Occupation of Kingston March 14. Occupation of Goldsboro March 21. Advance on Raleigh April 10–14. Occupation of Raleigh April 14. Bennett's House April 26. Surrender of Johnston and his army. Duty at Raleigh and Charlotte, N.C., until June.

== Casualties ==
The regiment lost a total of 68 enlisted men during service; 2 killed and 66 due to disease.

== Commanders ==
- Colonel Joab Arwin Stafford

== See also ==
- List of Ohio Civil War units
- Ohio in the Civil War
