= John C. McQuiston =

American Civil War officer (1823–1903)

John Craven McQuiston
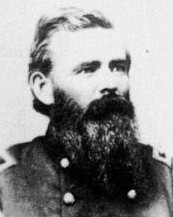
- Born: August 17, 1823; Madison, Indiana, U.S.
- Died: February 22, 1903 (aged 79); Williford, Arkansas, U.S.
- Burial place: Maple Park Cemetery, Springfield, Missouri
- Military career
- Allegiance: United States (Union)
- Branch: United States Army (Union Army)
- Service years: 1861 – 1862; 1864 – 1865
- Rank: Colonel; Bvt. Brigadier General
- Commands: 123rd Indiana Infantry Regiment
- Conflicts: American Civil War; McClellan's Operations in Northern Virginia; Battle of Ball's Bluff; Atlanta campaign; Franklin–Nashville campaign; Battle of Nashville; Campaign of the Carolinas; Battle of Wyse Fork

John Craven McQuiston (1823–1903) was an American Brevet Brigadier General who fought for the Union in the American Civil War. He participated in the Battle of Ball's Bluff and the Battle of Nashville throughout his career in the war as well as commanding the 123rd Indiana Infantry Regiment.

== Biography ==
McQuiston enlisted on the Union Army on April 23, 1861, as a captain in Company D of the 16th Indiana Infantry Regiment and was stationed at Warrenton Junction. He first saw active service at the Battle of Ball's Bluff and other battles around the Shenandoah in early 1862.

On May 23, 1862, at Washington, D. C., he was discharged from military service. He then briefly served as a provost marshal of the 4th District of Indiana before receiving a commission to become the Colonel of the 123rd Indiana Infantry Regiment on March 7 to 9, 1864. He would go on to serve in battles at the Atlanta campaign as well as the Battle of Nashville. Afterwards, the 123rd Indiana were sent to Washington, D.C. to embark on a steamship to participate in the Campaign of the Carolinas where he engaged in the Battle of Wyse Fork and until the Confederates surrendered.

McQuiston was promoted to Brevet Brigadier General on March 13, 1865. McQuiston and the 123rd Indiana were then mustered out on August 25, 1865, at either Raleigh or Charlotte.

He was a railroad engineer, conductor and road master. In 1872, he platted Richardson & McQuiston's Addition in the town of Fairland along the railroad in Shelby County, Indiana.

He died on February 22, 1903, at Williford, Arkansas and was buried at Maple Park Cemetery in Springfield, Missouri.

== See also ==
- List of American Civil War brevet generals (Union)
