= 129th Indiana Infantry Regiment =

129th Regiment Indiana Infantry
- Active: December 16, 1863 – August 29, 1865
- Country: United States
- Allegiance: Union
- Branch: Infantry
- Engagements: Atlanta campaign Battle of Resaca; Battle of Kennesaw Mountain; Siege of Atlanta; Battle of Lovejoy's Station; Battle of Franklin; Battle of Nashville; Carolinas campaign Battle of Wyse Fork

The 129th Regiment Indiana Infantry was an infantry regiment that served in the Union Army during the American Civil War.

== Service ==
The 129th Indiana Infantry was organized at Kendallville and Michigan City, Indiana beginning December 16, 1863, and mustered in March 1, 1864, under the command of Colonel Charles Case.

The regiment was attached to 2nd Brigade, 1st Division, XXIII Corps, Army of the Ohio, to June 1864. 4th Brigade, 2nd Division, XXIII Corps, to August 1864. 2nd Brigade, 2nd Division, XXIII Corps, to December 1864. 2nd Brigade, 1st Division, XXIII Corps, Army of the Ohio, to February 1865, and Department of North Carolina to August 1865.

The 129th Indiana Infantry mustered out of service August 29, 1865 at Charlotte, North Carolina.

== Detailed service ==
Duty at Michigan City until March 30. Moved to Nashville, Tennessee, March 30 – April 7. March to Charleston, Tennessee, April 7–24, 1864. Atlanta Campaign May 1 to September 8. Demonstrations on Dalton, Georgia, May 8–13. Rocky Faced Ridge May 8–11. Battle of Resaca May 14–15. Movements on Dallas May 18–25. Cartersville May 24. Operations on line of Pumpkin Vine Creek and battles about Dallas, New Hope Church, and Allatoona Hills May 25 – June 5. Operations about Marietta and against Kennesaw Mountain June 10 – July 2. Lost Mountain June 15–17. Muddy Creek June 17. Noyes Creek June 19. Assault on Kennesaw June 27. Nickajack Creek July 2–5. Ruff's Mills July 3–4. Chattahoochie River July 5–17. Siege of Atlanta July 22 – August 25. Utoy Creek August 5–7. Flank movement on Jonesboro August 25–30. Lovejoy's Station September 2–6. Operations against Hood in northern Georgia and northern Alabama September 29 – November 3. Nashville Campaign November–December. In front of Columbia November 24–27. Columbia Ford November 29. Battle of Franklin November 30. Battle of Nashville December 15–16. Pursuit of Hood to the Tennessee River December 17–28. At Clifton, Tennessee, until January 15, 1865. Movement to Washington, D.C.; then to Morehead City, North Carolina, January 15 – February 24. Carolinas Campaign March 1 – April 26. Advance on Kinston and Goldsboro March 1–21. Battle of Wyse Fork March 8–10. Kinston March 14. Occupation of Goldsboro March 21. Advance on Raleigh April 10–14. Occupation of Raleigh April 14. Bennett's House April 26. Surrender of Johnston and his army. Provost duty at Charlotte, North Carolina, May 9 – August 29.

== Casualties ==
The regiment lost a total of 189 men during service; 2 officers and 19 enlisted men killed or mortally wounded, 2 officers and 166 enlisted men died of disease.

== Commanders ==
- Colonel Charles Case – resigned June 1, 1864
- Colonel Charles A. Zollinger

== See also ==
- List of Indiana Civil War regiments
- Indiana in the Civil War
