= 63rd Indiana Infantry Regiment =

63rd Regiment Indiana Infantry
- Active: February 21, 1862 – June 21, 1865
- Country: United States
- Allegiance: Union
- Branch: Infantry
- Engagements: Atlanta campaign Battle of Resaca; Battle of Dallas; Battle of New Hope Church; Battle of Allatoona; Battle of Kennesaw Mountain; Siege of Atlanta; Battle of Jonesboro; Battle of Lovejoy's Station; Battle of Franklin; Battle of Nashville; Carolinas campaign

The 63rd Regiment Indiana Infantry was an infantry regiment that served in the Union Army during the American Civil War.

== Service ==
The 63rd Indiana Infantry was organized at Lafayette, Indiana, beginning February 21, 1862, as a battalion of four companies: A, B, C, and D. The remainder of the regiment was organized later in 1862 in Indianapolis.

The regiment was attached to Piatt's Brigade, Sturgis' Command, Defenses of Washington, to August 1862. Piatt's Brigade, Army of the Potomac, to October 1862. Railroad Guard, District of Western Kentucky, Department of the Ohio, to June 1863. Unattached, 2nd Division, XXIII Corps, Department of the Ohio, to August 1863. New Haven, Kentucky, 1st Division, XXIII Corps, to October 1863. District South Central Kentucky, 1st Division, XXIII Army Corps, to January 1864. District Southwest Kentucky, 1st Division, XXIII Corps, to April 1864. 2nd Brigade, 3rd Division, XXIII Corps, to August 1864. 3rd Brigade, 3rd Division, XXIII Corps, Army of the Ohio, to February 1865 and Department of North Carolina to June 1865.

Companies A, B, C, and D mustered out May 3, 1865. The remainder of the regiment mustered out of service on June 21, 1865.

== Detailed service ==
The regiment served as a prison guard at Lafayette and Camp Morton in Indianapolis, Indiana, until May. On May 27, they departed Indiana for Washington, D.C., where they participated in the defense of the capital until August 1862. During this period, they took part in Pope's Campaign in northern Virginia from August 16 to September 2.

On October 3, the regiment was ordered back to Indianapolis, where they completed the organization of the regiment and continued their duties as prison guards at Camp Morton and in Indianapolis until December 25, 1862. Following this, they were sent to Shepherdsville, Kentucky, on December 25, and performed guard duty along the Louisville & Nashville Railroad until January 16, 1864.

Their service included operations against Morgan on July 2, 1863, and action at Cummings Ferry on July 8. From January 16 to February 25, 1864, the regiment was stationed at Camp Nelson, Kentucky. In February, they marched over the mountains to Knoxville, Tennessee, remaining there until March 15, then moved to Mossy Creek and Bull's Gap in April. Between April 23 and 28, they participated in an expedition toward Jonesboro with the objective of destroying the Tennessee & Virginia Railroad.

From May 1 to September 8, 1864, the regiment was actively engaged in the Atlanta Campaign. Their operations included demonstrations on Rocky Faced Ridge and Dalton from May 8 to 13, and the Battle of Resaca on May 14 and 15. They fought at Cartersville on May 20, and conducted operations along Pumpkin Vine Creek, fighting at Dallas, New Hope Church, and Allatoona Hills from May 25 to June 5. The campaign continued with operations around Marietta and against Kennesaw Mountain from June 10 to July 2, including attacks at Lost Mountain (June 15–17), Muddy Creek (June 17), Noyes Creek (June 19), Cheyney's Farm (June 22), and Olley's Farm (June 26–27). They participated in the assault on Kennesaw Mountain on June 27, and fought at Nickajack Creek (July 2–5), Ruff's Mills (July 3–4), and at the Chattahoochee River (July 5–17), including action at Isham's Ford on July 8. The siege of Atlanta lasted from July 22 to August 25, followed by operations at Utoy Creek on August 5–7, and a flank movement on Jonesboro from August 25 to 30, culminating in the Battle of Jonesboro on August 31 and September 1. They also engaged at Lovejoy's Station from September 2 to 6.

In October, the regiment pursued Hood into Alabama until October 26. During the Nashville Campaign in November and December, they fought at Columbia from November 24 to 27, crossed Duck River on November 29, fought at the Battle of Franklin on November 30, and participated in the Battle of Nashville on December 15 and 16. Afterward, they pursued Hood into Alabama, crossing the Tennessee River from December 17 to 28, and remained at Clifton, Tennessee, until January 16, 1865.

The regiment then moved to Washington, D.C., and subsequently to Fort Fisher, North Carolina, from January 16 to February 9. They engaged in operations against Hoke from February 12 to 14, including the battles at Fort Anderson on February 18–19, Town Creek on February 19–20, and the capture of Wilmington on February 22. From March 1 to April 26, they participated in the Carolina Campaign, advancing on Goldsboro from March 6 to 21, and occupying Goldsboro on March 24. They fought at Gulley's on March 31, then advanced on Raleigh from April 10 to 14, occupying the city on April 14. They were present at Bennett's House on April 26 for the surrender of Johnston and his army. The regiment remained at Raleigh until May 5, then moved to Greensboro, where they stayed until June 21.

== Casualties ==
The regiment lost a total of 188 men during service; 3 officers and 53 enlisted men killed or mortally wounded, 2 officers and 130 enlisted men died of disease.

== Commanders ==
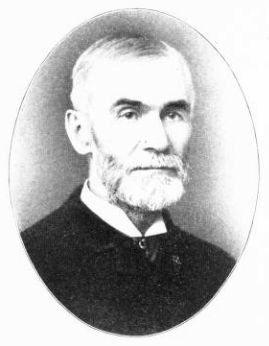
Israel Newton Stiles

- Colonel and brevet Brigadier General Israel Newton Stiles
- Lieutenant Colonel Daniel Morris - commanded at the Battle of Franklin, Battle of Nashville, and during the Carolinas Campaign
- Major Frank Wilcox - commanded during the Carolinas Campaign

== See also ==
- List of Indiana Civil War regiments
- Indiana in the Civil War
