= 93rd Illinois Infantry Regiment =

93rd Regiment Illinois Volunteer Infantry
- Illinois flag
- Active: October 13, 1862, to July 7, 1865
- Country: United States
- Allegiance: Union
- Branch: Infantry
- Engagements: Battle of Port Gibson; Battle of Raymond; Battle of Jackson; Battle of Champion Hill; Siege of Vicksburg; Siege of Jackson; Chattanooga campaign; Battle of Allatoona; Battle of Bentonville

The 93rd Regiment Illinois Volunteer Infantry was an infantry regiment that served in the Union Army during the American Civil War.

== Service ==
The 93rd Illinois Infantry was mustered into state service at Chicago, Illinois and mustered into Federal service on October 13, 1862.

The regiment was mustered out on June 23, 1865, and discharged at Chicago, Illinois, on July 7, 1865.

== Total strength and casualties ==
The regiment suffered 4 officers and 147 enlisted men who were killed in action or who died of their wounds and 1 officer and 147 enlisted men who died of disease, for a total of 294 fatalities.

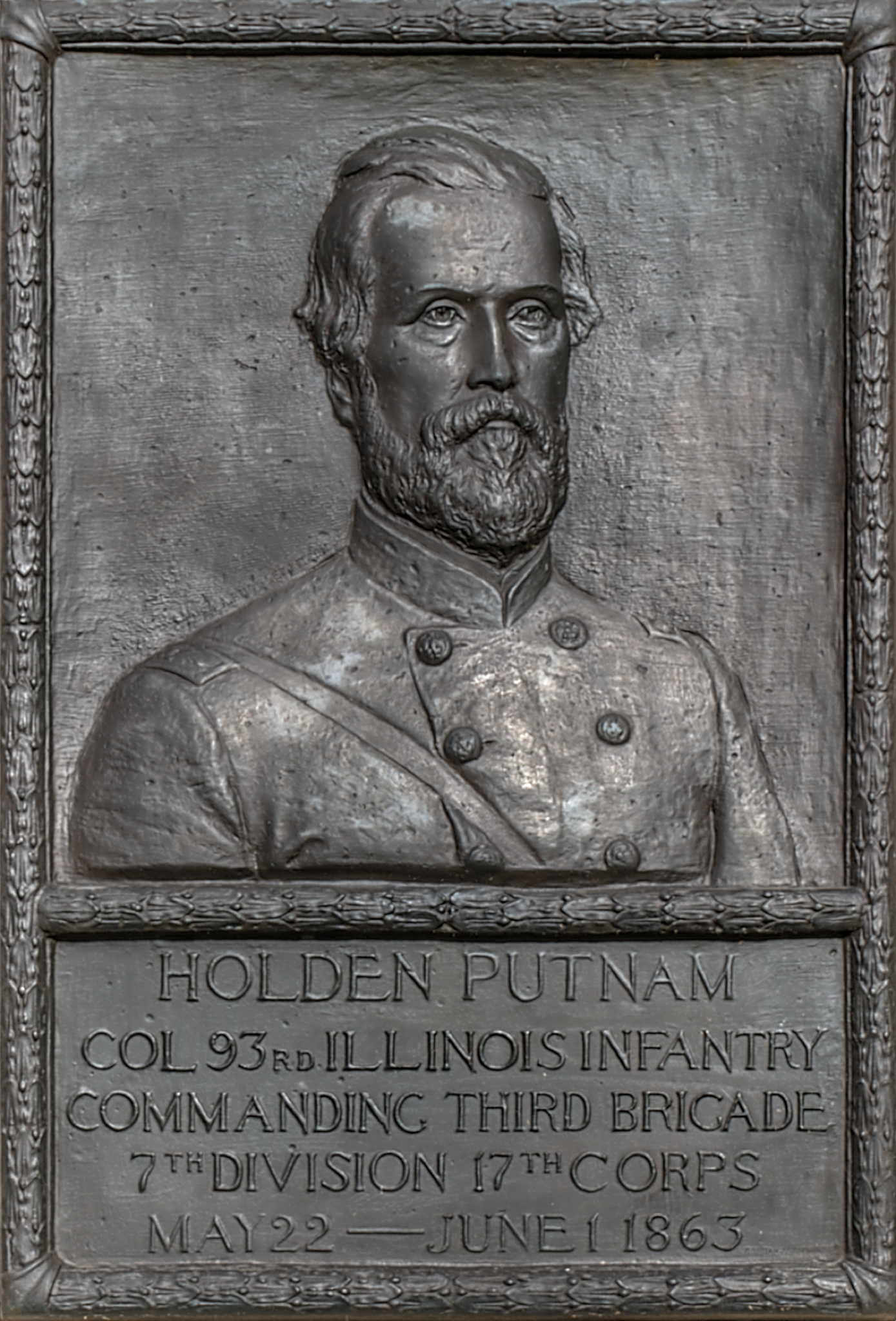
Bronze relief portrait of Col. Putnam at Vicksburg National Military Park

== Commanders ==
- Colonel Holden Putnam - killed November 25, 1863.

== See also ==
- List of Illinois Civil War Units
- Illinois in the American Civil War
