= 128th Indiana Infantry Regiment =

128th Regiment Indiana Infantry
- Active: December 15, 1863 – April 10, 1866
- Country: United States
- Allegiance: Union
- Branch: Infantry
- Engagements: Atlanta campaign Battle of Resaca; Battle of Kennesaw Mountain; Siege of Atlanta; Battle of Lovejoy's Station; Battle of Franklin; Battle of Nashville; Carolinas campaign Battle of Wyse Fork

The 128th Regiment Indiana Infantry was an infantry regiment that served in the Union Army during the American Civil War.

== Service ==
The 128th Indiana Infantry was organized at Michigan City, Indiana for three-years service beginning December 15, 1863, and mustered in March 18, 1864, under the command of Colonel Richard P. De Hart.

The regiment was attached to 1st Brigade, 1st Division, XXIII Corps, Army of the Ohio, to June 1864. 4th Brigade, 3rd Division, XXIII Corps, to August 1864. 3rd Brigade, 3rd Division, XXIII Corps, to December 1864. 1st Brigade, 1st Division, XXIII Corps, Army of the Ohio, to February 1865, and Department of North Carolina to August 1865. Department of North Carolina to April 1866.

The 128th Indiana Infantry mustered out of service April 10, 1866.

== Detailed service ==
Left Indiana for Nashville, Tennessee, March 23. March to Charleston, Tennessee, April 5–24, 1864. Atlanta Campaign May 1 to September 8. Demonstrations on Dalton, Georgia, May 8–13. Rocky Faced Ridge May 8–11. Battle of Resaca May 14–15. Movements on Dallas May 18–25. Operations on line of Pumpkin Vine Creek and battles about Dallas, New Hope Church, and Allatoona Hills May 25–June 5. Allatoona Pass June 1–2. Operations about Marietta and against Kennesaw Mountain June 10–July 2. Lost Mountain June 15–17. Muddy Creek June 17. Noyes Creek June 19. Assault on Kennesaw June 27. Nickajack Creek July 2–5. Chattahoochie River July 5–17. Siege of Atlanta July 22–August 25. Utoy Creek August 5–7. Flank movement on Jonesborough August 25–30. Lovejoy's Station September 2–6. Operations against Hood in northern Georgia and northern Alabama September 29 – November 3. Nashville Campaign November–December. In front of Columbia November 24–27. Battle of Franklin November 30. Battle of Nashville December 15–16. Pursuit of Hood to the Tennessee River December 17–28. At Clifton, Tennessee, until January 15, 1865. Movement to Washington, D.C.; then to Morehead City, North Carolina, January 15 – February 24. Carolinas Campaign March 1 to April 26. Advance on Kinston and Goldsboro March 1–21. Battle of Wyse Fork March 8–10. Kinston March 14. Occupation of Goldsboro March 21. Advance on Raleigh April 10–14. Occupation of Raleigh April 14. Bennett's House April 26. Surrender of Johnston and his army. Duty at Goldsboro and Raleigh until April 1866.

== Casualties ==
The regiment lost a total of 144 men during service; 4 officers and 27 enlisted men killed or mortally wounded, 1 officer and 112 enlisted men died of disease.

== Commanders ==
- Colonel Richard P. De Hart - mustered out April 29, 1865 due to disability
- Colonel Jasper Packard

== See also ==
- List of Indiana Civil War regiments
- Indiana in the Civil War
