= 84th Indiana Infantry Regiment =

Union army infantry regiment

84th Regiment Indiana Infantry
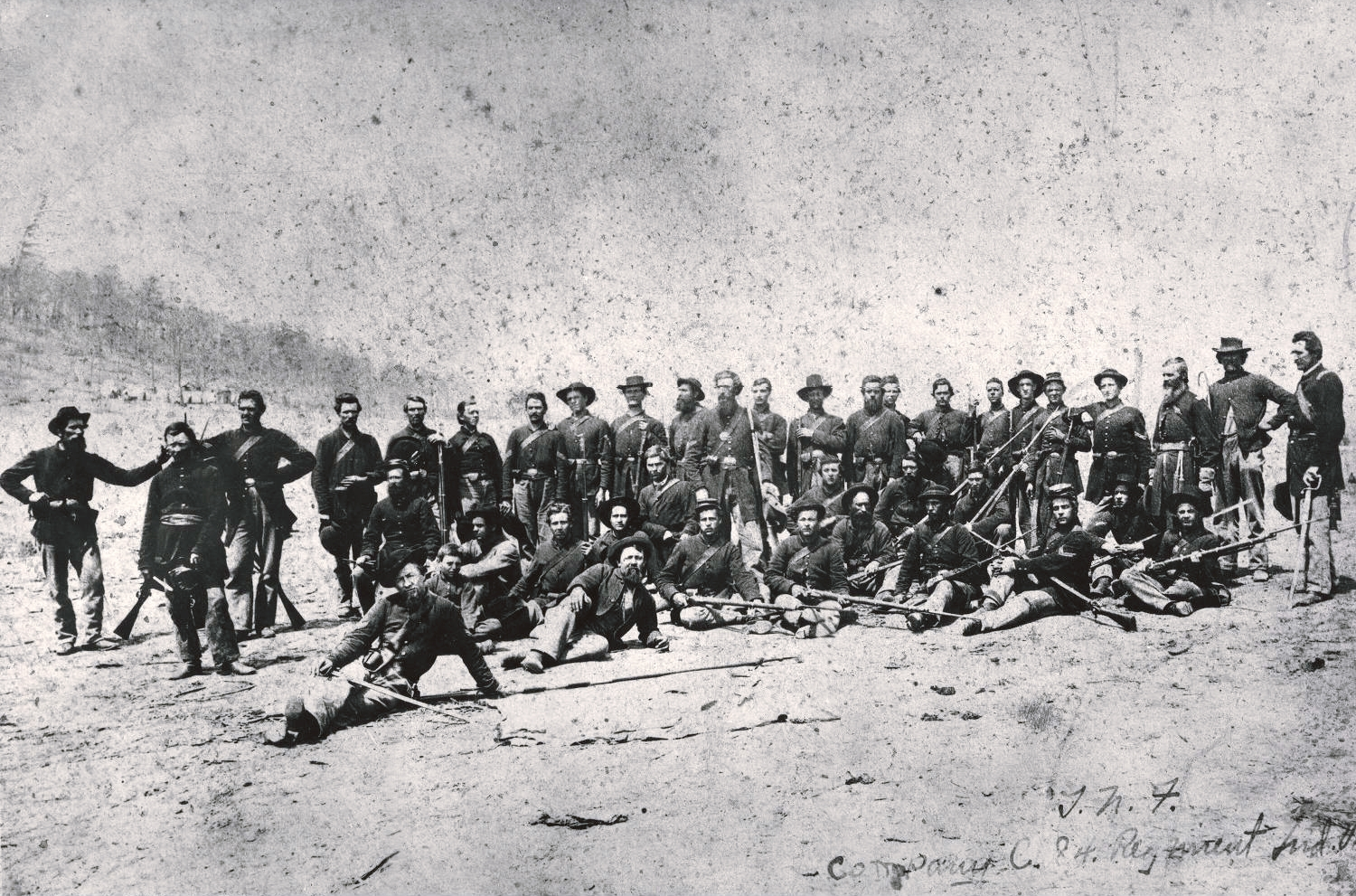
- Active: September 3, 1862, to June 14, 1865
- Country: United States
- Allegiance: Union
- Branch: Infantry
- Engagements: Defense of Cincinnati; Tullahoma Campaign; Battle of Chickamauga; Siege of Chattanooga; Battle of Missionary Ridge; Battle of Resaca; Atlanta campaign Battle of Kennesaw Mountain; Battle of Peachtree Creek; Siege of Atlanta; Battle of Jonesboro; Second Battle of Franklin; Battle of Nashville

The 84th Regiment Indiana Infantry was an infantry regiment that served in the Union Army during the American Civil War.

== Service ==
The 84th Indiana Infantry was organized at Indianapolis and Richmond, Indiana and mustered in for a three-year enlistment on September 3, 1862, under the command of Colonel Nelson Trusler.

The regiment was attached to 3rd Brigade, Kanawha Division, District of West Virginia, Department of the Ohio, October 1862. District of Eastern Kentucky, Department of the Ohio, to February 18, 1863. 2nd Brigade, Baird's 3rd Division, Army of Kentucky, Department of the Ohio, February 1863. Baird's Division, Franklin, Tennessee, Department of the Cumberland, to June 1863. 1st Brigade, 1st Division, Reserve Corps, Department of the Cumberland, to October 1863. 2nd Brigade, 1st Division, IV Corps, Army of the Cumberland, to August 1864. 3rd Brigade, 3rd Division, IV Corps, Army of the Cumberland, to June 1865.

The 84th Indiana Infantry mustered out of service on June 14, 1865. Non-veterans and recruits were transferred to the 57th Indiana Infantry.

=== Service summary ===
This regiment was organized at Richmond and was mustered in on September 3, 1862. It left the state on the 8th for Covington, Kentucky, where it was assigned to the defenses against the threatened invasion of Kirby Smith's forces.

On October 1 it moved by rail for Point Pleasant, West Virginia, and moved from there on the 13th for Guyandotte where it remained until November 14. It was then in the vicinity of Cassville and Catlettsburg, Kentucky, until February 7, 1863, when it left Catlettsburg for Louisville, which place was reached on the 17th and the regiment was assigned to the 2nd brigade, 3d division, Army of Kentucky.

It was first ordered to Nashville, then to Franklin, where it remained until June 3, being engaged in several skirmishes, including the pursuit of Van Dorn, March 9–12 and the repulse of Van Dorn's attack on Franklin April 10. June 3, it marched for Triune and was assigned to the 1st brigade, 1st division, reserve corps, Gen. Granger commanding.

Tullahoma Campaign June 23 – July 7. It was in the fight at Triune and pursuit of Bragg, the regiment marching to Middleton, Shelbyville and Wartrace, remaining there until August 12. It moved to Estill Springs on the 20th thence to Tullahoma, Stevenson, Bridgeport and Chattanooga, arriving at the latter place September 13.

It participated in the battle of Chickamauga, where its division held the extreme left, on the first day, repeatedly repulsing desperate assaults, and on the next day materially aided Gen. Thomas in saving his army from the massed assault of the enemy, losing in the two days 125 in killed, wounded and missing.

The regiment moved to Lookout Mountain, thence to Moccasin point, and on November 1, to Shell Mound, where it remained until January 26, 1864. It was then assigned to the 2nd brigade, 1st division, 4th army corps, and moved towards Georgia via Cleveland, being engaged at Buzzard Roost.

It returned to Cleveland and remained there until May 3, when it moved with the army for Atlanta. It was engaged at Tunnel Hill, Rocky Face Ridge, Dalton, Resaca, Kingston, Pumpkin Vine Creek, Pine Mountain, Kennesaw Mountain, Kolb's farm and Peachtree Creek.

It participated in the operations about Atlanta and in the battles of Jonesboro and Lovejoy's Station, afterward being transferred to the 2nd brigade, 3rd division, and left Atlanta on October 3, for Chattanooga, moving thence to Athens, Ala., and thence to Pulaski, Tenn., Columbia and Franklin, being present at the battle at the latter place on November 30.

It moved to Nashville, and in the battle there participated in a charge on the enemy's skirmish line, and later in a charge upon the main works of the enemy, carrying his position and driving him from the field. It moved in pursuit as far as Huntsville, Ala., and remained there until March 13, when it was ordered to eastern Tennessee, operating about Knoxville, Strawberry plains and Bull's Gap, until it moved to Nashville on April 18.

It was mustered out June 14, 1865, when the recruits were transferred to the 57th Indiana, with which they served until its muster out in November.

== Initial Movements ==
=== September 1862 ===
On September 8 the regiment left on the cars for Covington, Kentucky, under command of General Morris, no fixed officer having reached the regiment. The rebel General Kirby Smith was threatening Cincinnati, and troops were being concentrated to repel him. Upon arriving in front of the enemy, the command had neither arms, ammunition, accoutrements or uniform.

At two o'clock, on the morning of September 10, the regiment was furnished with arms and ten rounds of ammunition to the man; but the cartridges were too large for the guns. The result was that the regiment was marched two miles to the right on the Lexington Pike, where cartridges of proper caliber were procured. Captain Erwin, Sixth Ohio, was placed in command. Major Neff was present, but was not posted in military maneuvers. The command was formed in line of battle by Captain Erwin, on the southwestern side of a hill, one mile to the right of the Lexington pike. The heat of the sun was terrible, and water scarce. The men chewed cornstalks to allay their thirst. In a short time picks and shovels were furnished the regiment, and, being familiar with those tools, they soon intrenched themselves. Captain Erwin showed his sagacity in this respect. He knew the men were not prepared to fight, yet they could dig.

The command was assigned to the First Brigade, First Division, United States forces. General Judah commanded the division, and General Love the brigade. Lieutenant Colonel Orr took command of the regiment on September 15, and was relieved on the 20th by Colonel Nelson Trusler. In the meantime the rebel troops had fallen back. The regiment remained in camp among the hills of Kentucky until October first. The Eighty-Fourth was then ordered to report to Point Pleasant, Virginia. Transported by rail from Cincinnati to Portland, Ohio, it marched to Galliapolis, arriving on the 4th. Here the command remained until October fifteenth, and then left for Guyandotte, Virginia. The brigade consisted of the Fortieth Ohio, Eighty-Fourth Indiana, a squadron of cavalry, and a battery of four twelve-pounders, under command of Colonel Cramer, of the Fortieth Ohio. Arrived at Guyandotte on the next day. Here it remained until November 14. In the meantime a detachment of the Eighty-Fourth, two pieces of artillery and a squadron of cavalry was sent on a reconnaissance mission to Catlettsburg, Kentucky, at the mouth of the Big Sandy River. No enemy being found the command returned to camp. Company K joined the regiment during the last of October.

=== November 1862 ===
Adjutant Wood resigned on November 9. On the morning of November 9, the command started for Catlettsburg, arriving the same evening. Here the time was passed in drill and picket duty, until December 12, when the command moved to Louisa, Kentucky, thirty miles up the Big Sandy, arriving on the 14th and going into camp. The roads were deep with mud. The men went to social gatherings and parties to while away the time. The first paymaster appeared about this time, and made every man feel rich for a little while. And so, with song and dance, and mud, the year of 1862 went out, and 1863 found the regiment still in winter quarters on the banks of the Big Sandy.

=== February 1863 ===
On February 7, 1863, orders were received to report at Cincinnati. The command proceeded by steamer down the Big Sandy and Ohio rivers, arriving at Cincinnati on the 13th. From there the regiment proceeded to Louisville, and thence to Nashville, arriving on the 17th. The Eighty-Fourth was now assigned to the Second Brigade, Third Division, Army of Kentucky, and went into camp three miles south of Nashville, on the Franklin pike.

=== March 1863 ===
On March 5 the command left for Franklin, arriving the same evening. On the 9th they drew five days' rations and started on a reconnaissance, in force, in the direction of Duck River. Marched fourteen miles the first day, and bivouacked in the midst of a rain storm. Next day reached Rutherford's creek and bivouacked on the north bank. There was some fighting with a portion of the expedition and the enemy, but the Eighty-Fourth was not engaged. On the 12th the regiment returned to its camp on the north bank of the Harpeth River, near Franklin, making a march of twenty miles in six hours and a half. The day was warm; the men heavily loaded; yet all arrived safe in camp.

=== June 1863 ===
The regiment remained at Franklin until June 3, assisting in building Fort Granger, when it was ordered to move to Trinne, Tennessee. The command arrived at Triune on the evening of June third, and went into camp in a large clover field. The men were in good spirits and condition, and felt that soon there would be hot work with the enemy, as his cavalry was constantly skirmishing in the front, driving in the videttes, and being checked by our reserve of infantry on picket.

On June 11 the enemy made an attack upon our position. The affair lasted one hour and a half, the rebels being driven back. The Eighty-Fourth occupied the extreme left of the front line, and was among the foremost in pursuit, which was continued until dark, without loss to the regiment. The command then returned to camp at Triune.

On June 23 the command, with five days' rations, moved in the direction of Murfreesboro'. Arriving at Middletown during the afternoon of the 25th, it halted.

On the morning of the 27th the command was ordered to advance on Guy's Gap, where the enemy appeared to be in force. Upon the approach of our cavalry, with infantry supports, however, they retired in the direction of Shelbyville, our columns following in close pursuit. Reached Guy's Gap and bivouacked, having had no encounter with the enemy. Early next morning the Eighty-Fourth was detailed to guard five hundred rebel prisoners and convey them to Murfreesboro'. Upon reaching Middletown the prisoners were placed in custody of troops stationed there, and the regiment bivouacked.

=== July and August 1863 ===
The next day they marched to Shelbyville and camped three miles north. While in this vicinity the camp was moved several times. On July 3 it marched to Wartrace, Tennessee, where the regiment rested until August twelfth, living upon the fat of the land. Chickens, green corn, potatoes, peaches and other luxuries were plentiful, and the men improved in health upon the change of diet. On August 12 the command took up the line of march for Rossville, reaching Tullahoma next day, and in the afternoon marched to Estell Springs, crossed the Elk River and went into camp.

=== September 1863 ===
On August 21 the regiment returned to Tullahoma, and remained in camp there until September 7, at which time it was ordered to march for Stevenson, Alabama. Passing through various small towns the regiment arrived at Stevenson at sundown on the 9h, and bivouacked in the southern suburbs of the place. The next day they marched to Bridgeport, reaching there at noon, tired, hungry and thirsty.

On the 12th they crossed the Tennessee River and camped, and the next morning received orders to draw twelve days' rations and march for Chattanooga—distant some thirty miles.

After a toilsome march, during which they climbed the steep and rugged sides of Lookout Mountain, they reached Rossville next morning.

On the 18th the regiment received orders to march for the front. General Whittaker was at the head of the column. The command had marched five miles in the direction of Ringgold, when it came suddenly upon the rebel pickets, who fired upon the General and staff, but with no result, except to hasten forward our skirmishers. A detail was at once sent forward and skirmished with the enemy till dark. The Eighty-Fourth was formed in line of battle on the left of the Ringgold road, near a small stream called Pea Vine, or Little Chickamauga. The rebel batteries threw several shells over and around them, but did no damage, the command being protected by a slight elevation in front. After dark the regiment moved one hundred yards in advance, where the men lay down in line of battle, on their arms, for the night. Next morning they fell back to McAfee church, distant one mile, where the men prepared breakfast. Two companies were thrown forward as skirmishers, and were soon reinforced by a third; all under command of Major Neff. Three scouts being called for to act as videttes, E. D. Baugh, C. N. Taylor and John Wall, of Company E, tendered their service, and started for the front. They had hardly disappeared from view when the sharp crack of the rebel rifles was heard, answered at once by the fire of the scouts. Our skirmishers at once advanced, became sharply engaged with those of the enemy, and drove them back upon his main line. The reserve of the regiment then moved to the support of the skirmishers. The Eighty-Fourth was formed on the right of the Ringgold road behind a fence. A brisk fight ensued, lasting an hour and a half, the regiment losing twenty-two killed, wounded and missing. No support arriving, the command was forced back. They had been fighting a brigade of the rebel General Longstreet's command. In fact, owing to the heavy woods and thick underbrush obstructing the vision, and the enemy's familiarity with the country, the regiment was nearly surrounded before they were aware of their situation. The Fortieth Ohio and the One Hundred and Fifteenth Illinois, however, covered their flanks and rear, and saved them from being captured. They bivouacked that night near the McAfee church. The weather was extremely cold, a heavy frost covering the surface of the earth. Many of the men were compelled to build fires to keep from freezing, having no blankets. Drawing rations, and eating supper, the men lay down, little dreaming of the dreadful shock of arms on the battle-field of Chickamauga, which followed on the morrow.

== Battle of Chickamauga ==
Early on the morning of September twentieth skirmishers were sent out to feel the enemy, but found he had retired from the front. Soon orders came to General Steedman to bring his division to the right in support of General Thomas, who was fighting against overwhelming numbers of the enemy, and to save the gallant army of the Cumberland from ruin. Thomas was the hero of that fight, and saved the army. General Steedman at once put his troops in motion, and hastened to the rescue of the Fourteenth Corps. The command arrived just in time. The Eighty-Fourth was formed in line of battle on the right of the rear line of the brigade, preparatory to making an assault upon the rebels, who were posted on two hills, with a deep ravine between them. Colonel Trusler was ordered to remain where he was until the assault was made on either side of the ravine, and in case the front line was broken to fill the breach. The Colonel, seeing a breach in the front line, rushed his regiment into the ravine, when the enemy poured a most deadly fire upon it from three directions; right, left and front. It was impossible for men to remain and live under such a fire. In the brief space of fifteen minutes nearly one-third of the Eighty-Fourth were killed or wounded. Tho terrible result of the day footed up ninety-six killed, wounded and missing. Three officers were killed: Captain John H. Ellis, Lieutenant Hatfield and Lieutenant Mason. Three wounded: Captain Sellers, Lieutenant Smith and Lieutenant Moore. The division went into battle at one o'clock p.m., and fought until dark, making three assaults upon the enemy's lines. The command withdrew under cover of night, and marched to the old camp at Rossville.

== Siege of Chattanooga ==
On the morning of the 21st the command was ordered to fall back towards Chattanooga, and at one o'clock p.m., they took position on Missionary Ridge, on the left of the Army of the Cumberland. Here they threw up a line of works, and held the position until ten o'clock at night, when they quietly retired towards Chattanooga, reaching that town at four o'clock a.m., having marched slowly all night. Next day they crossed the Tennessee River and bivouacked on the magnificent hills on the north bank of that stream, which bear the general name of Waldron's Ridge. On the 24th they moved down the Tennessee River opposite Lookout Mountain. The Eighty-Fourth was sent down the river on picket duty, where it remained for nine consecutive days and nights, keeping up an almost constant fire upon the rebels who were posted on the opposite shore, behind the rocks, in a small stockade they had built. The Eighty-Fourth lost but one man killed. Upon being relieved they marched to Moccasin Point and went into camp. Soon received orders to move camp half a mile and erect winter quarters. They went to work at once, and notwithstanding the daily shellings from a rebel battery planted upon the point of Lookout Mountain, soon had their log houses complete. The suffering was terrible at this place. Having no tents or blankets, the weather being wet and cold, with short rations, it was strange that the soldiers survived the exposure. Sometimes they would be seen gathering grains of corn out of the mud, where the mules and horses had been fed, so long before that the grains had sprouted, and eagerly devouring them. Twenty-five cents was freely given by the hungry soldiers for a single ear of corn. But the men were cheerful and patient, and willing to endure all for the cause in which they were engaged.

=== October 1863 ===
Early in October the Eighty-Fourth was assigned to the Second Brigade, First Division, Fourth Army Corps. Colonel Trusler resigned on October 19.

=== November 1863 ===
On November 1 the command was ordered to cross the Tennessee River and march in the direction of Bridgeport. The column moved around the base of Lookout Mountain—the rebel battery, upon its crown, throwing shells in proximity as it passed—bivouacking that night in Wauhatchee Valley. Next day they reached Shell Mound, Tennessee, at sundown, hungry and cold, not a mouthful to eat having been given them during the whole day's march. General Whittaker rode along the line and told the men that they should have rations, which announcement was received with hearty cheers. Five days' full rations were at once issued. Most of the men sat up and cooked and ate all night.

On the morning of November 3, the command went into camp on the south bank of the Tennessee River, near Nickajack cave, and put up winter quarters. Major General Stanley took command of the First Division, to which the brigade was attached. The Eighty-Fourth Indiana was left in camp at Shell Mound to guard that point, while the rest of the brigade was sent to participate in the battles at Lookout Mountain and Mission Ridge. They were detailed for this purpose on account of having neither tents nor blankets, those articles having been captured and burned by the enemy at Waldron's Ridge, on October 4, while being transported from Bridgeport to Camp Clark, Tennessee.

=== December 1863 ===
On December 9, Lieutenant Colonel Orr resigned. A recruiting party had been sent to Indiana and returned with fifty-four men.

=== January 1864 ===
On January 26, 1864, the command marched to the Narrows, a distance of three miles. Here it was detailed to build the road to enable teams to pass. The next day they marched to Whiteside Station; thence to Lookout Creek, at the foot of Lookout Mountain.

On the 29th the regiment marched over Lookout Mountain to Chattanooga; thence through the town to Mission Ridge. On the 30th it crossed the waters of Chickamauga Creek, and went into camp near Tiner's Station.

=== February 1864 ===
On February 3 they moved to Ottawa Station, and thence, on the 6th, to Blue Springs, Tennessee. On the 22nd they marched to Red Clay, and reached Chickasaw Creek on the 23rd, where the division joined the left of the Fourteenth Corps. Next day they fell back three miles, and, taking another road, moved in the direction of Tunnel Hill to the support of the Fourteenth Corps. On the 25th it marched in the direction of Dalton, Georgia. After marching eight miles they found the rebel army drawn up in line of battle. Preparations were at once made for an attack. The Eighty-Fourth was formed in the center of the second line, to support the Fortieth Ohio. The charge was made at eleven a.m., resulting in driving the rebels two miles through the dense thickets of undergrowth near Buzzard Roost. Our forces skirmished with the enemy during the remainder of the day. The Eighty-Fourth was ordered to remain under cover of a small hill that afforded but little protection. The rebels kept up a furious fire of artillery during the day, doing considerable damage. The Eighty-Fourth lost in this engagement one man killed and two wounded. At nine o'clock a.m., they retired from the field, and reached the camp they had left in the morning, at two a.m., of the 26th.

During the afternoon of the same day they marched to Tunnel Hill, arriving at sunset, and ate supper in sight of the rebel camp fires. At eight p.m., they countermarched to Tiger's creek, arriving at one a.m., of the 27th, when, after a few hours, the command moved, leaving the Eighty-Fourth as rear guard to protect the train. After proceeding half a mile, the rebel cavalry fired upon the regiment from a hill to the left. The regiment at once formed in line of battle, and threw out skirmishers. Two pieces of artillery were posted at the Stone Church, and fired several rounds, checking the rebel advance, when the foe retired. Skirmishers were called in, and the command marched in the direction of Blue Springs, bivouacking that night on the rebel Colonel Ewing's farm; reached Blue Springs next day. The soldiers were now much worn down by the constant marching and skirmishing.

=== March 1864 ===
On March 10, Major A. J. Neff was promoted to the Lieutenant Colonel, and Captain William A. Boyd appointed Major. The command remained at Blue Springs, drilling and performing the usual duties of camp life for two months.

== Atlanta Campaign ==
=== May 1864 ===
That campaign, resulting in the capture of Atlanta, which has rendered the name of General W. T. Sherman famous in history, was commenced on May 3, 1864. The part taken by the Eighty-Fourth Indiana will be told in simple language.

At twelve o'clock on May 3, the command broke camp and marched to Red Clay. The next day they reached Catoosa Springs, and threw up a temporary line of works, behind which the Eighty-Fourth laid for the night. On the morning of the 5th they moved northeast of the Catoosa Springs, remaining there until the seventh, when they marched towards Tunnel Hill. When within two miles of the Hill the advance skirmished with the enemy. Two companies of the Eighty-Fourth were deployed as skirmishers. The brigade was ordered to march to the left and charge upon the enemy, who were in position upon an elevation east of the Tunnel. The movement was successful, the rebels being driven from the hill, with no loss to the regiment. The Eighty-Fourth was on the left of the front line. The brigade was the first upon Tunnel Hill, and the Eighty-Fourth the second regiment.

On the 8th instant they moved in line of battle towards Rocky Faced Ridge. Some skirmishing took place, with no loss. At night, the brigade fell hack to Tunnel Hill and bivouacked.

On the 9h the command advanced in the direction of the gap in Rocky Faced Ridge. After marching two miles the Eighty-Fourth Indiana and Ninety-Sixth Illinois were ordered to unsling knapsacks and prepare for an assault on the enemy's works. Three companies of the Eighty-Fourth, under Major Boyd, were thrown forward as skirmishers, with orders to press up the hill as far as possible, the regiment following in close support. The skirmishers became warmly engaged, and, being pressed by the heavy skirmish line of the enemy, two companies, under Captain Miller, were sent to reinforce them. The rebels had a decided advantage in position and shelter, and, as our men pressed forward, they took advantage of every rock and tree to cover them from the deadly fire blazing forth from the summit of the Ridge. At six p.m., the Eighty-Fourth charged the enemy's works, but were met by such a fierce and deadly fire as to be repulsed, with a loss of fourteen killed and wounded. Major William A. Boyd was mortally wounded while gallantly leading his companies. The main portion of the command retired a short distance and bivouacked, leaving four companies on the skirmish line till morning. On the 10th, the command moved to the left in support of a battery, and remained until night of the next day, when they moved to the right of the gap to relieve a portion of the Fourteenth Corps. The Eighty-Fourth took position behind temporary works on the front line. One company of fifty-two men, under Captain Carter, was advanced as skirmishers. The skirmishing was quite brisk during the twelfth. On the 13th it was ascertained by our advance that the rebels had evacuated Rocky Faced Ridge during the night, and the Eighty-Fourth moved through the Gap, passing through Dalton, and halting for the night nine miles south. The next morning they advanced towards Resacca, and found the enemy in force. The regiment at once formed in line of battle on the right of the road, forming the right of the Second Brigade. The Third Brigade was in front, and they moved forward to their support, taking a hill in front of the enemy's works. They then started to reform the Second Brigade, but while making the movement the enemy made an assault upon our front line, driving part of the Second Brigade in confusion from its position. The Eighty-Fourth, however, stood firm, and was soon formed in a strong position by General Stanley in person. The enemy was approaching in heavy force, four columns deep. The command was in a critical situation. The weight of the enemy's columns was irresistible. Yet the command awaited the shock with the calmness of heroes. At this thrilling moment, rescue came. New columns of Union troops marched through the woods, and the fighting Twentieth Corps of General Hooker fell upon the rebel columns like an avalanche, hurling them back in dismay and confusion.

The Fifth Indiana Battery did glorious work that day among the wild hills of Resacca. The rebel ranks were decimated by the skillful practice of its gunners. Though the firing was terrific the Eighty-Fourth met with no loss, owing to the protection afforded by the hill. The loss was heavy in other portions of the field. At night a strong line of works was built on the hill upon which the Eighty-Fourth was posted. Here the command remained until the morning of the 15th, when they moved, by the right flank, half a mile, where another line of works was built by the command, and one-half the regiment stood at arms during the night. On the night of the 15th the rebels evacuated Resacca and the works covering it, leaving many of their killed and wounded on the field of battle; also, arms, ammunition and army stores; indicating a precipitate retreat. The command entered Resacca at noon of the 16th, and baited until a pontoon bridge was laid across the Coosa River. Crossing the river they marched three miles toward Calhoun and bivouacked. The next day passed through Calhoun. and pushed on for Adairsville. Upon nearing that place the command was formed in line of battle, in expectation of meeting the enemy. The rebel force left during the night, falling back on Kingston. Our column at once pursued, halting on the 18th three miles from Kingston. At sunrise the next day, the eighty-fourth in advance, passed on in pursuit, and soon encountered the rebel pickets. One company deployed as skirmishers, under Lieutenant McLellan, briskly advanced. The rebel skirmishers fell back before our advance, until our column passed through Kingston. A short distance south the enemy showed a bold front. Two additional companies of the Eighty-Fourth, under Lieutenant Lemons, reinforced the skirmish line. The enemy still retreated; our forces slowly following. Soon the rebel force was encountered, formed in three lines of battle, across a large open field, threatening an immediate attack. It proved, however, to be only a feint of the rebel rear guard, covering the passage of their wagon train. Our batteries were soon in position, pouring shot and shell into their ranks. The rebel lines retired. The column moved to Cassville, and halted. The command rested here four days. For sixteen days they had listened to the roar of cannon and rattle of musketry, had marched and fought almost constantly. The whiz of bullets and screaming of shells had been their daily and nightly music. The men rested and drew clothing and rations.

On May 23 the command broke camp, and again moved forward to hunt the enemy amid the hills, valleys and forests of Northern Georgia. They crossed the Etowah River at sunset, marched until midnight, and camped. Next day they still pressed forward. On the 25th they crossed Pumpkin Vine Creek. On the 29th they were in the front line and built works, losing a few men, wounded. So for four days the skirmishing and marching continued. One man was killed on the 29th. All who participated in Sherman's advance upon Atlanta, know of the constant toil, both day and night, performed by the whole army.

=== June 1864 ===
On June 1 one hundred men worked all night on the breastworks. Working and fighting, halting and marching, the soldiers of the Eighty-Fourth kept mind and body busy, and reached Ackworth, Georgia, on June 6. Four days were passed here. On the 10th, they marched eight miles south, through rain and mud, and camped. On the 15th, they moved towards Marietta. After marching two miles the whole corps was formed in double column at half distance, and pushed through the woods and underbrush for some distance. But no enemy being encountered in force, the column deployed in line of battle, threw up slight defenses, and rested for the night. On the 17th they took possession of a line of works abandoned by the enemy. Next day the brigade moved to the right and joined the Twentieth Corps. And so, with continued advances, building works, skirmishing, artillery roaring, musketry crashing, the army advanced, like the sure and steady tread of Fate, until June 19, when the base of Kenesaw Mountain was reached, and upon its towering summit, in an impregnable position from the front, the rebels were found in. heavy force.

The Eighty-Fourth built a line of works across a corn field in the afternoon. At dark they relieved the Twenty-First Kentucky on the skirmish line; advanced after dark, approaching so close to the enemy's lines that the rebels quarreled with our men about the rails we were making breastworks with. In fact, the darkness of the night prevented the color of the uniform being detected, and the belligerents became mixed together, each party industriously building temporary defenses from the material furnished by the same rail fence. Early next morning the Eighty-Fourth advanced its main line, under a galling fire, losing six killed and wounded. Two regiments of the "Iron Brigade" made a charge in our front, captured the rebel skirmish line, and established a line of breastworks. Upon these the rebels made several unsuccessful charges during the night.

On the 21st the rebel batteries were very annoying. Lieutenant Gregory and two men were wounded by a tree top falling on them, which had been cut off by a solid shot. At dark 6f the twenty-second the command was relieved by the Eighteenth Regulars. They at once moved by the right flank three miles, and halted at daylight. The Eighty-Fourth, with other regiments, was now sent on the front line, to relieve a portion of the Twentieth Corps. The regiment held the center of the brigade line; sending out skirmishers. In the afternoon, orders were given the Eighty-Fourth to reinforce the skirmish line with three companies, preparatory to making a charge. The rebel line was near the summit of a hill, beyond a small wheat field. The signal was given, and amid a perfect storm of bullets, the Eighty-Fourth rushed across the wheat field, up the hill, capturing, on the skirmish line, thirty-seven prisoners, and penetrating within thirty paces of the main line of the enemy. The timber and thick underbrush through which they advanced, prevented the enemy from discovering their numbers, and protected them from his fire. They held the position one hour and a half, keeping up a brisk fire on the enemy. Meantime the rebels, learning that their right flank was unprotected, massed for an assault, and drove them back to their main line. The loss of the regiment in this affair was five killed, twenty-five wounded, and eleven prisoners. The regiment fortified during the night, and remained on the front line. One man was killed and one wounded on the 24th. Lieutenant Burres and one man were wounded on the 26th. At daylight on the 27th they were relieved by the Fourteenth Corps, and retired to the rear and left, where they were held in reserve during the unsuccessful charge which followed, upon the enemy's position on Kenesaw Mountain. That terrible and fatal assault is familiar to readers of military history. The position was soon afterwards turned by a flank movement, and the rebels evacuated in the night The Eighty-Fourth joined in the pursuit, and early on the morning of July 4 they were again drawn up in line of battle, and advanced nearly a mile, when the rebels were found in force behind a line of works. The regiment was again sent on the skirmish line, where they lost one man killed and four wounded. During the following night the enemy abandoned the works, and were pursued to Vining's Station, on the Chattahoochee, where the Eighty-Fourth went into camp.

They were now in sight of the doomed city of Atlanta, and commenced throwing up works.

On the morning of the 10th the command was ordered to march up the river about nine miles. The march was made on the double quick, as the Union forces had commenced to cross, and determined resistance was expected. The day being hot, hardly one hundred men were left in the brigade on arriving at their destination; many being sunstruck, and others giving out from fatigue and exhaustion. The Eighty-Fourth had about thirty representatives.

The regiment went into camp in the evening, where they remained till the twelfth instant, when they moved about two and a half miles on the south bank of the Cbattahoochee. Remaining there till the eighteenth, they again moved about five miles in the direction of Atlanta. On the 19th they took up the line of march in advance of the entire column. Moving forward about three miles, the brigade, with the exception of the Eighty-Fourth, went into camp. This regiment was sent as an escort to General Howard's Inspector General to ascertain the location of the right of the Twenty-Third Corps. Returning at dark, having accomplished their mission, they bivouacked for the night.

On the 28th the line of march was taken up at eight o'clock p.m. The advance of the brigade were continually skirmishing with the enemy until evening, when they were considerably advanced, and built a line of works, while the bullets were whistling about their ears. But one man was killed, however. Next morning they moved to the right, and relieved the Ninety-Sixth Illinois, throwing up another line of works. Five companies of the Eighty-Fourth were sent on the skirmish line, where they remained until dark, when they were relieved by the Twenty-First Kentucky, and retired to their line of works. The enemy evacuated and fell back to Atlanta during the night. Our forces advanced in pursuit, but had not pursued them more than one mile and a half when they came upon their outer line of works. The regiment went into position about noon, on the left of the front line of the brigade, and threw up a line of bomb-proof entrenchment. They remained in these works until the night of the 26th, continually skirmishing with the enemy, when they were sent back with the brigade about three miles, and occupied a line of works previously built by the rebels. On the morning of the 27th they were placed in position on the extreme left of the entire line, in the immediate vicinity of Atlanta, where they built still another line of works, with abattis in front. Here they pitched tents and remained until the night of August 1, when they moved to the right a short distance, and relieved a portion of the Twenty-Third Corps. Here they remained until the sixteenth, continually skirmishing, and occasionally making a feint on their lines, losing one man killed, instantly, and several severely wounded. Captain J. M. Taylor was slightly wounded in the arm.

The regiment was transferred, on the 15th instant, to the Third Brigade, same division, and was under command of General Grose. Nothing of importance, except skirmishing, occurred. Several officers and men, including Lieutenant J. S. Fisher, were wounded.

At dark, on the 25th, General Sherman commenced his grand flank movement around Atlanta. In this movement the Eighty-Fourth bore an active and important part, being engaged in many of the battles and skirmishes, and assisting in the destruction of railroads, bridges, and other property belonging to the so-called confederacy. At the engagement near Jonesboro, the regiment lost Captain Fellows and two privates, wounded.

At the battle of Lovejoy's Station, the Eighty-Fourth was in the front line, where they made a gallant and desperate charge, carrying their front line of works and capturing about thirty prisoners. In this charge the regiment lost sixteen men, killed, and three wounded; among them Captain Taylor, commanding the regiment.

=== September 1864 ===
Nothing of unusual interest occurred until the evening of September 5, when the regiment, with the rest of the army, took up the line of march, and entered Atlanta on the 8th, going into camp near the spot where the lamented General McPherson was killed.

=== October 1864 ===
On October 3 the regiment left Atlanta and marched to Chattanooga, where it arrived on the 13th. The Fourth Corps, to which it was attached, was assigned to the command of General Thomas. The regiment moved by rail from Chattanooga to Athens, Alabama, and thence to Pulaski, Tennessee, arriving at the latter place on November 4. It left Pulaski on the 23rd, and marched to Columbia, and on the 30th reached Franklin. Thence it marched to Nashville, where it arrived on December 1.

=== December 1864 ===
On December 15 the army of General Thomas moved upon the forces of the rebel General Hood, then strongly entrenched, and holding the southern approaches to Nashville. The regiment did not participate in the action of the first day, but upon the second day it was engaged in a charge upon the enemy's skirmish line, and at three p.m., it took part in a general charge upon the enemy's works, resulting in carrying their strongly entrenched position, and driving them in confusion from the field. In this battle the regiment lost twenty-three killed and wounded.

=== January 1865 ===
Joining in the pursuit of Hood, the regiment crossed the Tennessee River, when it was ordered to Huntsville, Alabama, where it arrived on January 5, 1865. March thirteenth it moved to Knoxville, Tennessee, and thence to Strawberry Plains, Bull's Gap and Shield's Mills. Here it remained till April 13, when it moved back again to Nashville.

=== June 1865 ===
The Eighty-Fourth was mustered out of the service on June 14, 1865, at Nashville, the remaining recruits being transferred to the 57th Regiment Indiana Infantry, with which regiment they continued in service in Texas until its muster out, in November 1865. The regiment left Nashville on June 15, for Indianapolis, where they arrived on the 17th.

They formed a portion of the returned heroes who had a public reception on the 26th, in the State House Grove, on which occasion they were welcomed in behalf of the State of Indiana, by Governor Morton, General Hovey, General Wilder, and others. They then returned to their peaceful homes, to reap the laurels so richly won.

The Eighty-Fourth left for the field with an aggregate of nine hundred and forty-four officers and men, and returned with three hundred and twenty-seven men and twenty-two officers.

== Battles fought ==
- Fought on November 15, 1862.
- Fought on September 19, 1863, at Chickamauga, Georgia.
- Fought on September 20, 1863, at Chickamauga, Georgia.
- Fought on September 24, 1863, at Lookout Mountain, Tennessee.
- Fought on October 2, 1863, at Lookout Mountain, Tennessee.
- Fought on October 15, 1863, at Chattanooga, Tennessee.
- Fought on February 25, 1864, at Buzzard's Roost, Georgia.
- Fought on May 7, 1864.
- Fought on May 9, 1864, at Tunnel Hill, Georgia.
- Fought on May 31, 1864, at Dallas, Georgia.
- Fought on June 18, 1864, at Pine Mountain, Georgia.
- Fought on June 23, 1864, at Kenesaw Mountain, Georgia.
- Fought on June 24, 1864, at Kenesaw Mountain, Georgia.
- Fought on June 25, 1864, at Kenesaw Mountain, Georgia.
- Fought on June 27, 1864, at Kenesaw Mountain, Georgia.
- Fought on June 28, 1864, at Kenesaw Mountain, Georgia.
- Fought on August 8, 1864, at Atlanta, Georgia.
- Fought on August 14, 1864, at Atlanta, Georgia.
- Fought on September 2, 1864, at Lovejoy Station, Georgia.
- Fought on September 19, 1864, at Chickamauga, Georgia.
- Fought on December 12, 1864, at Nashville, Tennessee.
- Fought on December 16, 1864, at Nashville, Tennessee.
- Fought on March 13, 1865.
- Fought on April 9, 1865.

== Casualties ==
The regiment lost a total of 234 men during service; 5 officers and 82 enlisted men killed or mortally wounded, 2 officers and 145 enlisted men died of disease.

== Commanders ==
- Colonel Nelson Trusler - resigned October 17, 1863, due to ill health
- Colonel Andrew J. Neff - awarded Colonel posthumously.
- Colonel Martin B. Miller
- Lieutenant Colonel Samuel Orr - resigned December 9, 1863
- Lieutenant Colonel Andrew Jackson Neff
- Lieutenant Colonel William A. Boyd - killed at Tunnel Hill, Georgia
- Lieutenant Colonel John C. Taylor
- Lieutenant Colonel Martin B. Miller
- Lieutenant Colonel George N. Carter
- Major Andrew J. Neff
- Major William A. Boyd
- Major William Burres
- Major John C. Taylor
- Major Martin B. Miller
- Major George N. Carter
- Major Robert M. Grubbs

== See also ==
- List of Indiana Civil War regiments
- Indiana in the Civil War
