= 120th Indiana Infantry Regiment =

120th Regiment Indiana Infantry
- Active: December 1863 – January 8, 1866
- Country: United States
- Allegiance: Union
- Branch: Infantry
- Engagements: Atlanta campaign Battle of Resaca; Battle of Kennesaw Mountain; Siege of Atlanta; Battle of Lovejoy's Station; Battle of Franklin; Battle of Nashville; Carolinas campaign Battle of Wyse Fork

The 120th Regiment Indiana Infantry was an infantry regiment that served in the Union Army during the American Civil War.

== Service ==
The 120th Indiana Infantry was organized at Columbus, Indiana for three-years service beginning in December 1863 and mustered in March 1, 1864, under the command of Colonel Richard F. Barter.

The regiment was attached to 1st Brigade, 1st Division, XXIII Corps, Army of the Ohio, to June 1864. 4th Brigade, 3rd Division, XXIII Corps, to August 1864. 3rd Brigade, 3rd Division, XXIII Corps, to December 1864. 1st Brigade, 1st Division, XXIII Corps, Army of the Ohio, to February 1865, and Department of North Carolina to August 1865. Department of North Carolina to January 1866.

The 120th Indiana Infantry mustered out of service January 8, 1866.

== Detailed service ==
The regiment left Indiana for Louisville, Kentucky, on March 20, 1864; then moved to Nashville, Tennessee. Marched to Charleston, Tennessee, April 7–24, 1864.

=== Atlanta campaign (May 1 to September 8, 1864) ===
Demonstrations on Dalton May 8–13. Rocky Faced Ridge May 8–11. Battle of Resaca May 14–15. Movements on Dallas May 18–25. Operations on line of Pumpkin Vine Creek and battles about Dallas, New Hope Church, and Allatoona Hills May 25 – June 5. Cassville May 27. Operations about Marietta and against Kennesaw Mountain June 10 – July 2. Lost Mountain June 15–17. Muddy Creek June 17. Noyes Creek June 19. Assault on Kennesaw June 27. Nickajack Creek July 2–5. Chattahoochie River July 5–17. Siege of Atlanta July 22 – August 25. Utoy Creek August 5–7. Flank movement on Jonesborough August 25–30. Lovejoy's Station September 2–6.

Operations in northern Georgia and northern Alabama against Hood September 29 – November 3.

=== Nashville campaign (November–December 1864) ===
In front of Columbia November 24–27. Battle of Franklin November 30. Battle of Nashville December 15–16. Pursuit of Hood to the Tennessee River December 17–28. At Clifton, Tennessee, until January 15, 1865.

Movement to Washington, D.C., then to Morehead City, North Carolina, January 15 – February 24.

=== Campaign of the Carolinas (March 1 – April 26, 1865) ===
As part of General Sherman's Carolinas campaign, the regiment advanced on Kinston and Goldsboro from March 1–21. The regiment participated in the Battle of Wyse Fork, just outside Kinston, from March 8–10. Following the Union victory in the battle, the regiment occupied Kinston on March 11 and Goldsboro on March 21. It advanced on Raleigh from April 10–14 and occupied it on April 14. It was at Bennett's House on April 26 for the surrender of General Joseph E. Johnston and his army.

Duty at Raleigh until May 10. At Charlotte and Greensboro, North Carolina, until August 21, and at Raleigh until January 1866, when it was mustered out.

== Casualties ==
The regiment lost a total of 168 men during service; 1 officer and 26 enlisted men killed or mortally wounded, 1 officer and 140 enlisted men died of disease.

== Commanders ==
- Colonel Richard F. Barter - resigned August 8, 1864
- Colonel Allen W. Prather - resigned August 30, 1865
- Colonel Reuben C. Kise
- Major John M. Barcus - commanded at the Battle of Nashville

== See also ==
- List of Indiana Civil War regiments
- Indiana in the Civil War
