= 8th Iowa Cavalry Regiment =

- Iowa state flag
- Active: September 30, 1863, to August 13, 1865
- Country: United States
- Allegiance: Union
- Branch: Cavalry
- Engagements: Battle of Resaca; Battle of Kennesaw Mountain; Battle of Franklin; Battle of Nashville

The 8th Iowa Cavalry Regiment was a cavalry regiment that served in the Union Army during the American Civil War.

== Service ==
The 8th Iowa Cavalry was mustered into Federal service at Davenport, Iowa, for a three-year enlistment on September 30, 1863.

The regiment was mustered out of Federal service on August 13, 1865.

== Total strength and casualties ==
A total of 1442 men served in the 8th Iowa at one time or another during its existence. It suffered 15 enlisted men who were killed in action or who died of their wounds and 3 officers and 176 enlisted men who died of disease, for a total of 194 fatalities.

== Commanders ==
- Colonel Joseph B. Dorr
- Colonel Horatio G. Barner.

== See also ==
- List of Iowa Civil War Units
- Iowa in the American Civil War
