= 5th Tennessee Infantry Regiment (Union) =

- Active: February 1862 to June 30, 1865
- Country: United States
- Allegiance: Union
- Branch: Infantry
- Engagements: Battle of Resaca; Battle of Spring Hill; Second Battle of Franklin; Battle of Nashville; Carolinas Campaign

The 5th Tennessee Infantry Regiment was an infantry regiment that served in the Union Army during the American Civil War.

== Service ==
The 5th Tennessee Infantry was organized at Barbourville, Kentucky and Harrison, Tennessee February through March 1862 and mustered in for a three-year enlistment.

The regiment was attached to 25th Brigade, 7th Division, Army of the Ohio, to October 1863. 1st Brigade, District of West Virginia, Department of the Ohio, to November 1862. 1st Brigade, 2nd Division, Centre, XIV Corps, Army of the Cumberland, to January 1863. 1st Brigade, 2nd Division, XIV Corps, to April 1863. District of Central Kentucky, Department of the Ohio, to June 1863. 3rd Brigade, 3rd Division, XXIII Corps, Department of the Ohio, to August 1863. 3rd Brigade, 3rd Division, Reserve Corps, Army of the Cumberland, to October 1863. 2nd Brigade, 2nd Division, XIV Corps, to November 1863. Spear's Tennessee Brigade, Chattanooga, Tennessee, to December 1863. Spear's Tennessee Brigade, 2nd Division, XXIII Corps, to January 1864. 3rd Brigade, Rousseau's 3rd Division, XII Corps, Department of the Cumberland, to April 1864. 2nd Brigade, 3rd Division, XXIII Corps, Army of the Ohio, to June 1864. 3rd Brigade, 3rd Division, XXIII Corps, to December 1864. 2nd Brigade, 3rd Division, XXIII Corps, to January 1865. Post of Nashville, Tennessee, to February 1865. 2nd Brigade, 3rd Division, XXIII Corps, Department of North Carolina, to June 1865.

The 5th Tennessee Infantry mustered out of service on June 30, 1865.

== Detailed service ==
Cumberland Gap Campaign March 28-June 18, 1862. Moved to Cumberland Ford April. Big Creek Gap June 11–12 and 15. Occupation of Cumberland Gap June 18-September 17. Cumberland Gap August 16. Expedition to Pine Mountain September 6–10. Big Creek Gap September 7. Evacuation of Cumberland Gap and retreat to Greenupsburg, Ky., September 17-October 3. Near Gallipolis, Ohio, and operations in the Kanawha Valley, W. Va., until November. Ordered to Louisville, Ky., thence to Cincinnati, Ohio, and Nashville, Tenn. Duty at Nashville until April 1863, and at Carthage, Tenn., until August. Ordered to McMinnville August 31. March to Chattanooga September 13–20. Sequatchie Valley September 21–23. Missionary Ridge and Shallow Ford Gap September 22. Near Summerville September 23. At Sale Creek until December. Ordered to Kingston Tenn. Near Kingston December 4. Duty near Knoxville and operations in eastern Tennessee until April 1864. Atlanta (Ga.) Campaign May to September. Demonstrations on Dalton May 5–13. Rocky Faced Ridge May 8–11. Battle of Resaca May 14–15. Cartersville May 20. Operations on line of Pumpkin Vine Creek and battles about Dallas, New Hope Church and Allatoona Hills May 25-June 5. Operations about Marietta and against Kenesaw Mountain June 10-July 2. Lost Mountain June 15–17. Muddy Creek June 17. Cheney's Farm June 22. Olley's Farm June 26–27. Assault on Kennesaw June 27. Nickajack Creek July 2–5. Chattahootchie River July 5–17. Decatur July 19. Howard House July 20. Siege of Atlanta July 22-August 25. Utoy Creek August 5–7. Flank movement on Jonesboro August 25–30. Near Rough and Ready August 31. Jonesboro September 1. Lovejoy Station September 2–6. At Decatur till October. Operations against Hood in northern Georgia and northern Alabama October 3–26. Nashville Campaign November–December. Columbia Duck River November 24–27. Spring Hill November 29. Battle of Franklin November 30. Battle of Nashville December 15–16. Pursuit of Hood to the Tennessee River December 17–28. At Clifton, Tenn., until January 15, 1865. Moved to Washington. D. C., thence to Fort Fisher, N. C., January 16-February 9. Operations against Hoke February 11–14. Fort Anderson February 18. Town Creek February 20. Capture of Wilmington February 22. Campaign of the Carolinas March 1-April 26. Advance on Kinston and Goldsboro March 6–21. Occupation of Goldsboro March 21. Advance on Raleigh April 9–14. Occupation of Raleigh April 14. Bennett's House April 26. Surrender of Johnston and his army. Duty at Raleigh and Greensboro until June.

== Casualties ==
The regiment lost a total of 246 men during service; 1 officer and 40 enlisted men killed or mortally wounded, 204 enlisted men died of accident or disease.

== Commanders ==
- Colonel James T. Shelley
- Lieutenant Colonel Nathaniel Witt - commanded at the battle of Nashville

== See also ==
- List of Tennessee Civil War units
- Tennessee in the Civil War
