= 23rd Kentucky Infantry Regiment =

- Active: January 2, 1862, to December 27, 1865
- Country: United States
- Allegiance: Union
- Branch: Infantry
- Engagements: Battle of Perryville; Battle of Stones River; Tullahoma Campaign; Battle of Chickamauga; Chattanooga campaign Atlanta campaign Battle of Resaca; Battle of Kennesaw Mountain; Siege of Atlanta; Battle of Jonesboro; Battle of Franklin; Battle of Nashville

The 23rd Kentucky Infantry Regiment was an infantry regiment that served in the Union Army during the American Civil War.

== Service ==
The 23rd Kentucky Infantry Regiment was organized at Camp King in Covington, Kentucky and mustered in for a three-year enlistment on January 2, 1862, under the command of Colonel Marcellus Mundy.

The regiment was attached to District of Kentucky, Department of the Ohio, to March 1862. 23rd Independent Brigade, Army of the Ohio, to July 1862. 10th Brigade, 4th Division, Army of the Ohio, to September 1862. 10th Brigade, 4th Division, II Corps, Army of the Ohio, to November 1862. 3rd Brigade, 2nd Division, Left Wing, XIV Corps, Army of the Cumberland, to January 1863. 3rd Brigade, 2nd Division, XXI Corps, Army of the Cumberland, to October 1863. 2nd Brigade, 3rd Division, IV Corps, to August 1864. 2nd Brigade, 1st Division, IV Corps, to June 1865. 1st Brigade, 1st Division, IV Corps, to August 1865. Department of Texas to December 1865.

The 23rd Kentucky Infantry mustered out of service on December 27, 1865.

== Detailed service ==
The regiment did garrison and guard duty in southern Kentucky and middle Tennessee from January to August 1862. Next it was at Round Mountain, near Woodbury, Tennessee, on August 27. It them marched to Louisville, Kentucky, in pursuit of Bragg, September 1–26. Pursuit of Bragg into Kentucky October 1–16. It was a reserve unit for the Battle of Perryville on October 8. March to Nashville, Tennessee, October 17-November 7, and duty there until December 26. Advance on Murfreesboro December 26–30. Lavergne December 27. Battle of Stones River December 30–31, 1862 and January 1–3, 1865. Woodbury January 24. At Murfreesboro until June. Scout from Clarksville May 20–22. Tullahoma Campaign June 23-July 7. At Manchester until August 16. Passage of Cumberland Mountains and Tennessee River and Chickamauga Campaign August 16-September 22. Ringgold September 11. Lee and Gordon's Mills September 12–13. Battle of Chickamauga September 19–20. Siege of Chattanooga, September 24-November 23. Reopening Tennessee River October 26–29. Brown's Ferry October 27. Chattanooga-Ringgold Campaign November 23–27. Orchard Knob November 23–24. Missionary Ridge November 25. Pursuit to Graysville November 26–27. March to relief of Knoxville November 28-December 8. Charlestown December 28. Operations in eastern Tennessee December 1863 to April 1864. Regiment veteranized at Blain's Cross Roads, Tenn., January 5, 1864. Atlanta Campaign May 1 to September 8, 1864. Demonstrations on Rocky Faced Ridge and Dalton, Ga., May 5–13. Battle of Resaca May 14–15. Adairsville May 17. Near Kingston May 18–19. Near Cassville May 19. Operations on line of Pumpkin Vine Creek and battles about Dallas, New Hope Church and Allatoona Hills May 25-June 5. Pickett's Mills May 27. Operations about Marietta and against Kennesaw Mountain June 10-July 2. Pine Hill June 11–14. Lost Mountain June 15–17. Assault on Kennesaw June 27. Ruff's Station, Smyrna Camp Ground, July 4. Pace's Ferry July 5. Chattahoochie River July 6–17. Peachtree Creek July 19–20. Siege of Atlanta July 22-August 25. Utoy Creek August 5–7. Flank movement on Jonesboro August 25–30. Battle of Jonesboro August 31-September 1. Lovejoy's Station September 2–6. Operations against Hood in northern Georgia and northern Alabama October 1–26. Nashville Campaign November–December. Columbia, Duck River, November 24–27. Battle of Franklin November 30. Battle of Nashville December 15–16. Pursuit of Hood to the Tennessee River December 17–29. Moved to Huntsville, Ala., and duty there until March 1865. Expedition to Bull's Gap and operations in eastern Tennessee March 15-April 22. At Nashville, until June. Ordered to New Orleans, June 6; thence moved to Texas July. Duty at Indianola, Green Lake and Victoria until December.

== Casualties ==
The regiment lost a total of 191 men during service; 5 officers and 84 enlisted men killed or mortally wounded, 102 enlisted men died of disease.

== Commanders ==
- Colonel Marcellus Mundy
- Lieutenant Colonel J. P. Jackson
- Lieutenant Colonel James C. Foy
- Lieutenant Colonel George W. Northup - commanded at the battle of Nashville
- Major Thomas J. Hamrick

== Notable members ==
- Private Henry Fitzallen, Company B - "Henry Fitzallen" was a pseudonym for Marian McKenzie, a wartime cross-dresser who was discovered to be a woman four months after enlisting.

== See also ==
- List of Kentucky Civil War Units
- Kentucky in the Civil War
