= Battle of Lovejoy's Station =

1864 battle of the American Civil War

Coordinates: 33.4441°N 84.3084°W

- Part of the American Civil War
| Date | August 20, 1864 |
| Location | Clayton County, Georgia |
| Result | Confederate victory |

Belligerents
| Confederate States | United States (Union) |

Commanders and leaders
| (Confederate States of America) William H. Jackson | (United States) Judson Kilpatrick |

Units involved
| Jackson's Cavalry Division | Kilpatrick's Cavalry Division |

Casualties and losses
| 240 | 237 |
- Location within Georgia

The Battle of Lovejoy's Station was fought on August 20, 1864, in Clayton County, Georgia, during the American Civil War.

== Battle ==
While Confederate Major-General Joseph Wheeler was absent raiding Union supply lines from North Georgia to East Tennessee, Maj. Gen. William Sherman, unconcerned, sent Judson Kilpatrick to raid Rebel supply lines. Leaving on August 18, Kilpatrick hit the Atlanta & West Point Railroad that evening, tearing up a small area of tracks. Next, Kilpatrick headed for Lovejoy's Station on the Macon & Western Railroad. In transit, on the 19th, Kilpatrick's cavalrymen hit the Jonesborough supply depot on the Macon & Western Railroad, burning great amounts of supplies.

On the 20th, Kilpatrick's cavalrymen reached Lovejoy's Station and began their destruction. Rebel infantry (Cleburne's Division) appeared and the raiders were forced to fight into the night, finally fleeing to prevent encirclement. Although Kilpatrick had destroyed supplies and track at Lovejoy's Station, the railroad line was back in operation in two days.

The two sides had arrived at something of a stalemate, with the Union army half-encircling Atlanta and the Confederate defenders staying behind their fortifications. Contemporary sources state the fighting on August 20 was continuous from Lovejoy to Walnut Creek.

== Battlefield preservation ==
The area of this historic battle has mostly been lost due to suburban sprawl of Clayton and Henry Counties, Georgia. The last 100 acres (0.40 km^{2}) on the Henry County side are the site of a battle of another kind. Local citizens, preservationists, and historians are fighting to stop the development of this rural farmland. The local community has offered to buy back the land to develop a historic park to commemorate the Civil War battle.

Henry County, Georgia announced the official opening of the Nash Farm Battlefield Park, which was the scene of Kilpatrick's Raid on August 20 and the Infantry action from September 2 to September 6, 1864. Plans for the 202-acre (0.82 km^{2}) battlefield include converting the farmhouse into a museum and renovating the barn into a public meetings and event facility, as well as walking trails throughout the property. The museum, called the Nash Farm Battlefield Museum, was closed permanently on June 1, 2017 Due to a change in demographics among the county representatives.

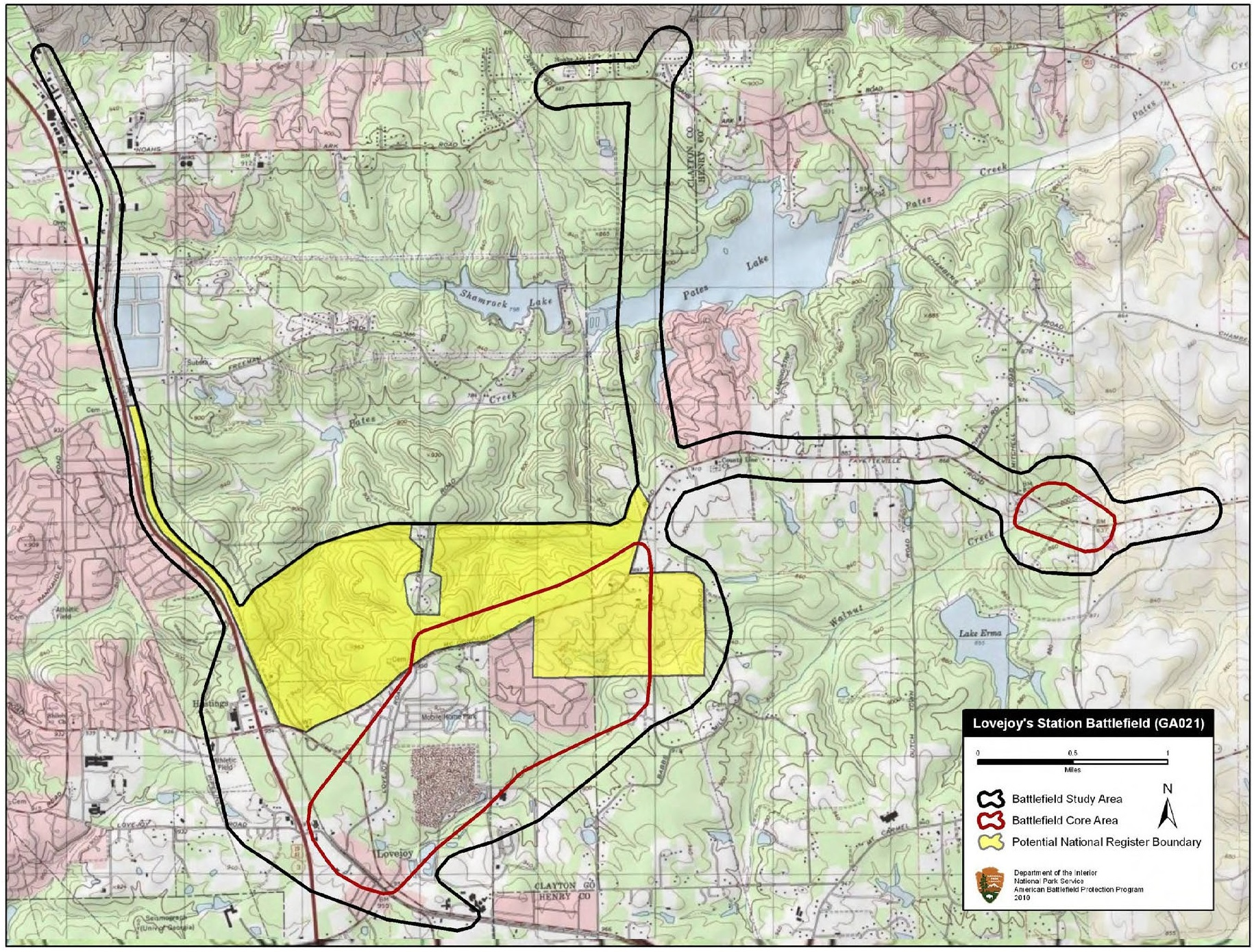
Map of the battlefield core and study areas by the American Battlefield Protection Program.

A survey, "Summary Report of History and Archeology of the Nash Farm Battlefield", was completed in August 2007. On March 12, 2008, Lovejoy Station was placed for the second time on the Civil War Preservation Trust's List of Most Endangered Civil War Battlefields. In 2010, the National Park Service published a revised assessment of the Civil War battles in Georgia, in which the Battle of Lovejoy was reassessed in terms of its military significance and its geographic extent.

The National Park Service considers the August 20 action to be a battle, but there were three other military actions at Lovejoy in 1864: Brig. Gen. Edward M. McCook's cavalry raid of July 29 and July 30, the September 2 to September 6 action, and the November 16 cavalry action. Historical archeology in 2010 documented unexplored portions of the battlefield that existed along McDonough-Jonesboro Road, east of U.S. Highway 41.
