= List of Indiana units in the American Civil War =

United States flag in 1865

List of military units raised by the state of Indiana during the American Civil War.

== Artillery units ==
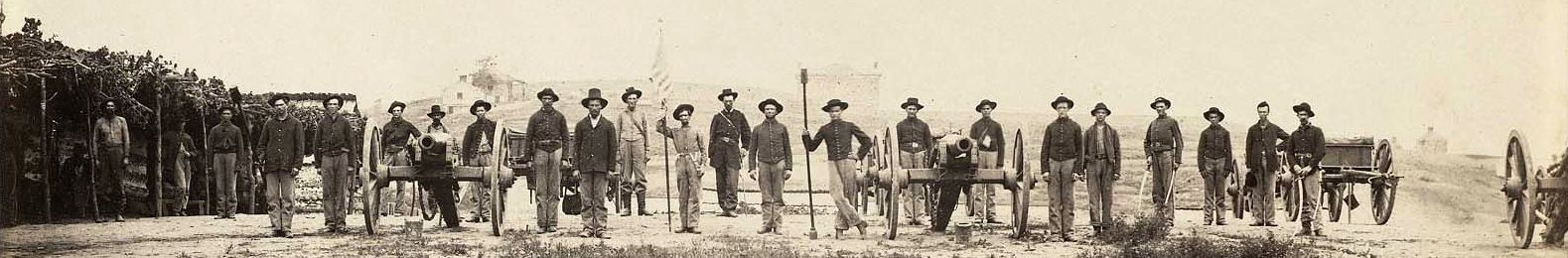
Half of the 20th Indiana Battery outside Chattanooga, TN, 1864

1st Indiana Heavy Artillery Regiment	9th Independent Battery Indiana Light Artillery	18th Independent Battery Indiana Light Artillery (Lilly's)
1st Independent Battery Indiana Light Artillery (Klauss's)	10th Independent Battery Indiana Light Artillery	19th Independent Battery Indiana Light Artillery
2nd Independent Battery Indiana Light Artillery	11th Independent Battery Indiana Light Artillery	20th Independent Battery Indiana Light Artillery
3rd Independent Battery Indiana Light Artillery	12th Independent Battery Indiana Light Artillery	21st Independent Battery Indiana Light Artillery
4th Independent Battery Indiana Light Artillery	13th Independent Battery Indiana Light Artillery	22nd Independent Battery Indiana Light Artillery
5th Independent Battery Indiana Light Artillery (Simonson's)	14th Independent Battery Indiana Light Artillery	23rd Independent Battery Indiana Light Artillery
6th Independent Battery Indiana Light Artillery	15th Independent Battery Indiana Light Artillery	24th Independent Battery Indiana Light Artillery
7th Independent Battery Indiana Light Artillery	16th Independent Battery Indiana Light Artillery	25th Independent Battery Indiana Light Artillery
8th Independent Battery Indiana Light Artillery	17th Independent Battery Indiana Light Artillery	26th Independent Battery Indiana Light Artillery (Wilder or Rigby's)

== Cavalry ==
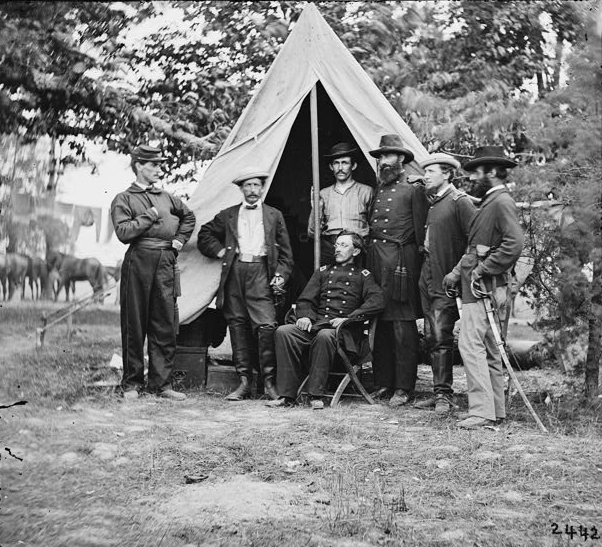
Officers of the 3rd Regiment Indiana Cavalry (East Wing) on duty with the Army of the Potomac.

Note: Cavalry regiments also had infantry designations.

- 1st Indiana Cavalry Regiment
  (28th Infantry)
- 2nd Indiana Cavalry Regiment
  (41st Infantry)
- 3rd Indiana Cavalry Regiment
  (45th Infantry)
  - East Wing (Army of the Potomac)
  - West Wing (Army of the Ohio)
- 4th Indiana Cavalry Regiment
  (77th Indiana Infantry Regiment)
- 5th Indiana Cavalry Regiment
  (90th Infantry)
- 6th Indiana Cavalry Regiment
  (71st Infantry)
- 7th Indiana Cavalry Regiment
  (119th Infantry)
- 8th Indiana Cavalry Regiment
  (39th Infantry)
- 9th Indiana Cavalry Regiment
  (121st Indiana Infantry Regiment)
- 10th Indiana Cavalry Regiment
  (125th Infantry)
- 11th Indiana Cavalry Regiment
  (126th Infantry)
- 12th Indiana Cavalry Regiment
  (127th Infantry)
- 13th Indiana Cavalry Regiment
  (131st Infantry)
- Stewart's Independent Cavalry Company
- Bracken's Independent Cavalry Company
- Independent Company Mounted Scouts

== Infantry ==
Note: The 1st, 2nd, 3rd, 4th and 5th Regiments Indiana Volunteer Infantry were units that served in the Mexican–American War.

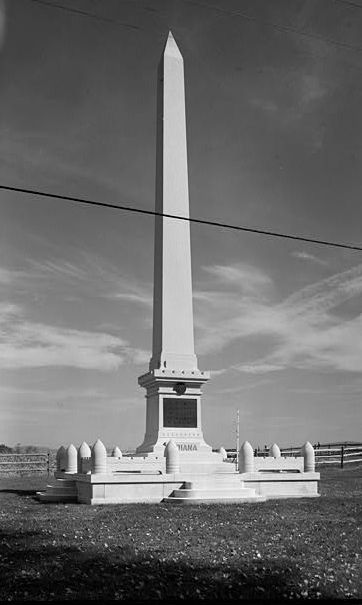
Indiana State Monument, Antietam National Battlefield, commemorating the 7th, 14th, 19th and 27th Infantry and 3rd Cavalry (East Wing)

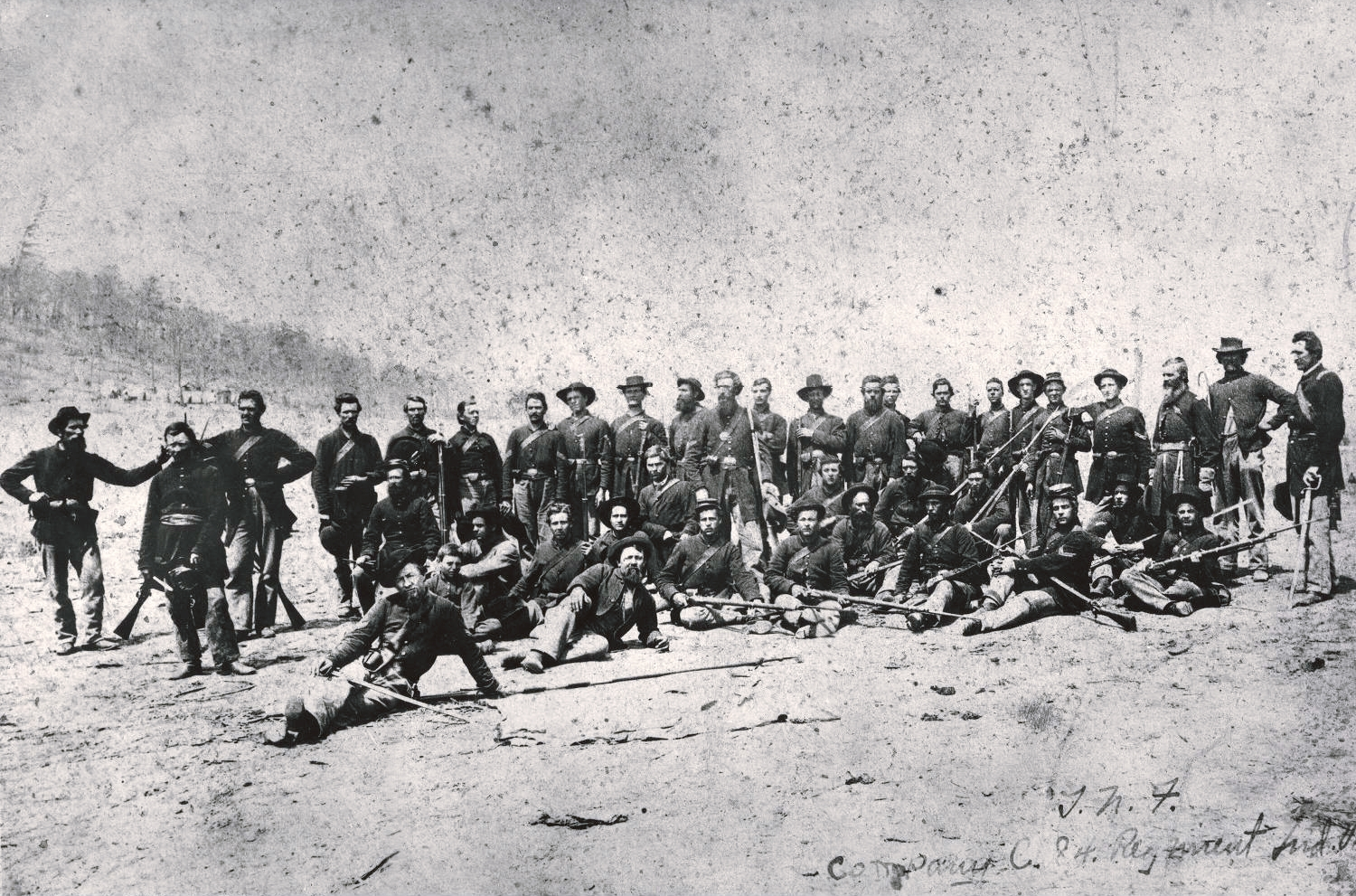
84th Indiana Infantry Regiment photograph. Soldiers Identified at

6th Indiana Infantry Regiment	58th Indiana Infantry Regiment	112th Indiana Infantry Regiment
7th Indiana Infantry Regiment	59th Indiana Infantry Regiment	113th Indiana Infantry Regiment
8th Indiana Infantry Regiment	60th Indiana Infantry Regiment	114th Indiana Infantry Regiment
9th Indiana Infantry Regiment	61st Indiana Infantry Regiment (2nd Irish Regiment)	115th Indiana Infantry Regiment
10th Indiana Infantry Regiment	62nd Indiana Infantry Regiment	116th Indiana Infantry Regiment
11th Indiana Infantry Regiment	63rd Indiana Infantry Regiment	117th Indiana Infantry Regiment
12th Indiana Infantry Regiment (1 year)	64th Indiana Infantry Regiment	118th Indiana Infantry Regiment
12th Indiana Infantry Regiment (3 years)	65th Indiana Infantry Regiment	119th Indiana Infantry Regiment (7th Cavalry)
13th Indiana Infantry Regiment	66th Indiana Infantry Regiment	120th Indiana Infantry Regiment
14th Indiana Infantry Regiment	67th Indiana Infantry Regiment	121st Indiana Infantry Regiment (9th Cavalry)
15th Indiana Infantry Regiment	68th Indiana Infantry Regiment	122nd Indiana Infantry Regiment
16th Indiana Infantry Regiment	69th Indiana Infantry Regiment	123rd Indiana Infantry Regiment
17th Indiana Infantry Regiment	70th Indiana Infantry Regiment	124th Indiana Infantry Regiment
18th Indiana Infantry Regiment	71st Indiana Infantry Regiment (6th Cavalry)	125th Indiana Infantry Regiment (10th Cavalry)
19th Indiana Infantry Regiment	72nd Indiana Infantry Regiment	126th Indiana Infantry Regiment (11th Indiana Cavalry Regiment)
20th Indiana Infantry Regiment	73rd Indiana Infantry Regiment	127th Indiana Infantry Regiment (12th Cavalry)
21st Indiana Infantry Regiment	74th Indiana Infantry Regiment	128th Indiana Infantry Regiment
22nd Indiana Infantry Regiment	75th Indiana Infantry Regiment	129th Indiana Infantry Regiment
23rd Indiana Infantry Regiment	76th Indiana Infantry Regiment	130th Indiana Infantry Regiment
24th Indiana Infantry Regiment	77th Indiana Infantry Regiment (4th Cavalry)	131st Indiana Infantry Regiment (13th Cavalry)
25th Indiana Infantry Regiment	78th Indiana Infantry Regiment	132nd Indiana Infantry Regiment
26th Indiana Infantry Regiment	79th Indiana Infantry Regiment	133rd Indiana Infantry Regiment
27th Indiana Infantry Regiment	80th Indiana Infantry Regiment	134th Indiana Infantry Regiment
28th Indiana Infantry Regiment (1st Cavalry)	81st Indiana Infantry Regiment	135th Indiana Infantry Regiment
28th Indiana Infantry Regiment (Colored)	82nd Indiana Infantry Regiment	136th Indiana Infantry Regiment
29th Indiana Infantry Regiment	83rd Indiana Infantry Regiment	137th Indiana Infantry Regiment
30th Indiana Infantry Regiment	84th Indiana Infantry Regiment	138th Indiana Infantry Regiment
31st Indiana Infantry Regiment	85th Indiana Infantry Regiment	139th Indiana Infantry Regiment
32nd Indiana Infantry Regiment (1st German Regiment)	86th Indiana Infantry Regiment	140th Indiana Infantry Regiment
33rd Indiana Infantry Regiment	87th Indiana Infantry Regiment	141st Indiana Infantry Regiment
34th Indiana Infantry Regiment	88th Indiana Infantry Regiment	142nd Indiana Infantry Regiment
35th Indiana Infantry Regiment (1st Irish Regiment)	89th Indiana Infantry Regiment	143rd Indiana Infantry Regiment
36th Indiana Infantry Regiment	90th Indiana Infantry Regiment (5th Cavalry)	144th Indiana Infantry Regiment
37th Indiana Infantry Regiment	91st Indiana Infantry Regiment	145th Indiana Infantry Regiment
38th Indiana Infantry Regiment	92nd Indiana Infantry Regiment	146th Indiana Infantry Regiment
39th Indiana Infantry Regiment	93rd Indiana Infantry Regiment	147th Indiana Infantry Regiment
40th Indiana Infantry Regiment	94th Indiana Infantry Regiment	148th Indiana Infantry Regiment
41st Indiana Infantry Regiment (2nd Cavalry)	95th Indiana Infantry Regiment	149th Indiana Infantry Regiment
42nd Indiana Infantry Regiment	96th Indiana Infantry Regiment	150th Indiana Infantry Regiment
43rd Indiana Infantry Regiment	97th Indiana Infantry Regiment	151st Indiana Infantry Regiment
44th Indiana Infantry Regiment	98th Indiana Infantry Regiment	152nd Indiana Infantry Regiment
45th Indiana Infantry Regiment (3rd Cavalry)	99th Indiana Infantry Regiment	153rd Indiana Infantry Regiment
46th Indiana Infantry Regiment	100th Indiana Infantry Regiment	154th Indiana Infantry Regiment
47th Indiana Infantry Regiment	101st Indiana Infantry Regiment	155th Indiana Infantry Regiment
48th Indiana Infantry Regiment	102nd Indiana Infantry Regiment	156th Indiana Infantry Regiment
49th Indiana Infantry Regiment	103rd Indiana Infantry Regiment	157th Indiana Infantry Regiment
50th Indiana Infantry Regiment	104th Indiana Infantry Regiment	158th Indiana Infantry Regiment
51st Indiana Infantry Regiment	105th Indiana Infantry Regiment	159th Indiana Infantry Regiment
52nd Indiana Infantry Regiment	106th Indiana Infantry Regiment	
53rd Indiana Infantry Regiment	107th Indiana Infantry Regiment	
54th Indiana Infantry Regiment	108th Indiana Infantry Regiment	
55th Indiana Infantry Regiment	109th Indiana Infantry Regiment	
56th Indiana Infantry Regiment	110th Indiana Infantry Regiment	
57th Indiana Infantry Regiment	111th Indiana Infantry Regiment	

== See also ==
- Lists of American Civil War units by state

== Sources ==
- The Civil War Archive, Union Regimental Index: Indiana
- Dyer, Frederick H. (1959). A Compendium of the War of the Rebellion. New York and London. Thomas Yoseloff, Publisher. LCCN 59-12963.
- Holloway, William R. (2004). Civil War Regiments from Indiana. eBookOnDisk.com Pensacola, Florida. ISBN 1-9321-5731-X. (Note: Originally published in 1908 by the Federal Publishing Company.)
