= 146th Regiment =

146th Regiment may refer to:

- 146th Field Artillery Regiment, United States
- 146th (Pembroke and Cardiganshire) Field Regiment, Royal Artillery
- 146th Light Anti-Aircraft Regiment, Royal Artillery
- 146th Heavy Anti-Aircraft Regiment, Royal Artillery
- 146th Infantry Regiment (United States)
- 146th Regiment Royal Armoured Corps

== American Civil War regiments ==
- 146th Illinois Infantry Regiment
- 146th Indiana Infantry Regiment
- 146th New York Infantry Regiment
- 146th Ohio Infantry Regiment

== See also ==
- 146th Division (disambiguation)
