= 22nd Independent Battery Indiana Light Artillery =

- Active: December 15, 1862 – July 7, 1865
- Country: United States
- Allegiance: Union
- Branch: Artillery
- Engagements: Atlanta campaign Siege of Atlanta; Battle of Atlanta; Franklin-Nashville Campaign; Battle of Franklin; Battle of Nashville; Carolinas campaign Battle of Wyse Fork

The 22nd Indiana Battery Light Artillery was an artillery battery that served in the Union Army during the American Civil War.

== Service ==
The battery was organized in Indianapolis, Indiana, in October 1862, and assembled on December 15, 1862, for a three-year enlistment under the command of Captain Benjamin F. Denning.

The battery was initially unattached. Thereafter it served in:

- Army of Kentucky, Department of the Ohio, to June 1863
- 1st Brigade, 2nd Division, 23rd Corps, Army of the Ohio, to August 1863
- Russellsville, Kentucky, 1st Division, XXIII Corps, to December 1863
- District of Southwest Kentucky, 1st Division, XXIII Corps, to April 1864
- Camp Burnside, Kentucky, District of Kentucky, Department of the Ohio, to June 1864
- Artillery, 2nd Division, XXIII Corps, to November 1864
- Garrison Artillery, Nashville, Tennessee, Department of the Cumberland, to December 1864
- Artillery, 1st Division, XXIII Corps, Army of the Ohio, to February 1865
- Department of North Carolina to April 1865. Artillery, 1st Division, X Corps, Department of North Carolina, to June 1865.

The 22nd Indiana Battery Light Artillery mustered out of service on July 7, 1865, in Indianapolis.

== Detailed service ==
The unit left Indiana for Louisville, Kentucky in March 1863. They were on duty at Louisville, Bowling Green, and Russellville, Kentucky, until December 1863. They engaged in the pursuit of Morgan from July 2–26, 1863. It moved to Point Burnside, Kentucky, December 1863, and served there until May 1864. They were ordered to join the Army of the Ohio in the field. They participated in the Atlanta Campaign June 29-September 8 and specifically at Nickajack Creek July 2–5, Chattahoochee River July 5–17, Decatur July 19, Howard House July 20, Siege of Atlanta July 22-August 25, Utoy Creek August 5–7, Flank movement on Jonesboro August 25–30, and Lovejoy's Station September 2–6.

They engaged in the pursuit of Hood into Alabama October 1–26. They participated in the Nashville Campaign during November–December, including the Battle of Franklin November 30. They were at the Battle of Nashville December 15–16 and continued the pursuit of Hood to the Tennessee River December 17–28. They were at Clifton, Tennessee, until January 16, 1865.

They moved to Washington, D.C., then to Morehead City, North Carolina, January 16-February 20. The joined the Campaign of the Carolinas March 1-April 26 and the advance on Kinston and Goldsboro March 6–21. They fought in the Battle of Wyse Fork March 8–10. They were part of the occupation of Kinston March 14. and Goldsboro on March 21. They were in the advance on Raleigh April 10–14 and its Raleigh on April 14. They reached Bennett's House April 26. They attended the surrender of Johnston and his army. They were on duty in North Carolina until June. Ordered to Indianapolis to muster out.

== Casualties ==
The battery lost a total of 13 men during service; 1 officer and 1 enlisted man killed or mortally wounded, while 11 enlisted men died of disease.

== Commanders ==
- Captain Benjamin F. Denning - mortally wounded July 1, 1864
- Captain Edward W. Nicholson
- Lieutenant George W. Alexander - commanded during the Carolinas Campaign

== See also ==
- List of Indiana Civil War regiments
- Indiana in the Civil War
