= 151st Regiment =

151st Regiment may refer to:

- 151st Aviation Regiment
- 151st Cavalry Regiment
- 151st Infantry Regiment (United States)
- 151st Infantry Regiment "Sassari"
- 151st Regiment Royal Armoured Corps
- 151st (Ayrshire Yeomanry) Field Regiment, Royal Artillery
- 151 Regiment RLC

== American Civil War regiments ==
- 151st Illinois Infantry Regiment
- 151st Indiana Infantry Regiment
- 151st New York Infantry Regiment
- 151st Ohio Infantry Regiment
- 151st Pennsylvania Infantry Regiment

== See also ==
- 151st Division (disambiguation)
