= 23rd Independent Battery Indiana Light Artillery =

- Active: November 8, 1862 – July 2, 1865
- Country: United States
- Allegiance: Union
- Branch: Artillery
- Engagements: Atlanta campaign Battle of Resaca; Battle of Dallas; Battle of New Hope Church; Battle of Allatoona; Battle of Kennesaw Mountain; Siege of Atlanta; Franklin-Nashville Campaign; Battle of Franklin; Battle of Nashville; Carolinas campaign

23rd Indiana Battery Light Artillery was an artillery battery that served in the Union Army during the American Civil War.

== Service ==
The battery was organized at Indianapolis, Indiana, and mustered in November 8, 1862, for a three-year enlistment.

The battery was attached to the District of Louisville, Kentucky, Department of the Ohio, to September 1863. Artillery, Wilcox's Left Wing forces, XXIII Corps, Department of the Ohio, to January 1864. District of the Clinch, Department of Ohio, to April 1864. Artillery, 1st Division, XXIII Corps, Department of the Ohio, to August 1864. Artillery, 3rd Division, XXIII Corps, Army of the Ohio, to February 1865, and Department of North Carolina to June 1865.

The 23rd Indiana Battery Light Artillery mustered out of service on July 2, 1865, at Indianapolis, Indiana.

== Detailed service timeline ==
- On duty at Indianapolis, Indiana, guarding Confederate prisoners until July 1863.
- Ordered to Louisville, Kentucky, July 4.
- Operations against Morgan in Kentucky July 1863.
- Duty at Indianapolis, until September.
- Left Indiana for Camp Nelson, Kentucky, September 16.
- Marched to Cumberland Gap September 24-October 3, then to Morristown October 6–8.
- Marched to Greenville and duty there until November 6.
- Moved to Bull's Gap and duty there until December.
- Marched across Clinch Mountain to Clinch River December.
- Duty in District of the Clinch until April 1864.
- Atlanta campaign May 1-September 8.
- Demonstrations on Rocky Faced Ridge and Dalton, Georgia, May 8–13.
- Battle of Resaca May 14–15.
- Operations on line of Pumpkin Vine Creek and battles about Dallas, New Hope Church, and Allatoona Hills May 25-June 5.
- Operations about Marietta, Georgia and against Kennesaw Mountain June 10-July 2.
- Lost Mountain June 15–17.
- Muddy Creek June 17.
- Assault on Kennesaw June 27.
- Nickajack Creek July 2–5.
- Chattahoochie River July 5–17.
- Siege of Atlanta July 22-August 25.
- Utoy Creek August 5–7.
- Flank movement on Jonesboro August 25–30.
- Lovejoy's Station September 2–6.
- Pursuit of Hood into Alabama October 1–26.
- Nashville Campaign November–December.
- Columbia, Duck River, November 24–27.
- Columbia Ford November 28–29.
- Battle of Franklin November 30.
- Battle of Nashville December 15–16.
- Pursuit of Hood to the Tennessee River December 17–28.
- At Clifton, Tennessee, until January 16, 1865.
- Movement to Washington, D.C., then to Fort Fisher, North Carolina, January 16-February 9.
- Operations against Robert Hoke February 11–14.
- Fort Anderson February 18–19.
- Capture of Wilmington February 22.
- Campaign of the Carolinas March 1-April 26.
- Advance on Goldsboro March 6–21.
- Occupation of Goldsboro March 21.
- Advance on Raleigh April 10–14.
- Occupation of Raleigh April 14.
- Bennett Place:Surrender of Johnston and his army April 26.
- Duty at Greensboro until June.

== Casualties ==
The battery lost a total of 19 men during service; 2 enlisted men killed or mortally wounded, 17 enlisted men died of disease.

== Commanders ==
- Lieutenant Aaron A. Wilber - commanded at the battle of Nashville

== See also ==
- List of Indiana Civil War regiments
- Indiana in the Civil War
