= 157th Regiment =

157th Regiment may refer to:

- 157th Field Artillery Regiment, United States
- 157th Infantry Regiment "Liguria", Italy
- 157 (Welsh) Regiment RLC

== American Civil War regiments ==
- 157th Indiana Infantry Regiment
- 157th New York Infantry Regiment
- 157th Ohio Infantry Regiment
- 157th Pennsylvania Infantry Regiment

== See also ==
- 157th Division (disambiguation)
