= 143rd Regiment =

143rd Regiment may refer to:

- 143rd Field Artillery Regiment
- 143rd Infantry Regiment (United States)
- 143rd (Mixed) Heavy Anti-Aircraft Regiment, Royal Artillery
- 143rd Regiment Royal Armoured Corps

== American Civil War regiments ==
- 143rd Illinois Infantry Regiment
- 143rd Indiana Infantry Regiment
- 143rd New York Infantry Regiment
- 143rd Ohio Infantry Regiment
- 143rd Pennsylvania Infantry Regiment

== See also ==
- 143rd Division (disambiguation)
