= 150th Indiana Infantry Regiment =

- Active: March 9 – August 5, 1865
- Disbanded: August 5, 1865
- Country: United States
- Allegiance: Union
- Branch: Infantry
- Size: Regiment (Note: According to W.H.H. Terrell (1867), The Report of the Adjutant General of the State of Indiana. Containing Rosters for the Years 1861–1865, Volume 7, the 150th Indiana Infantry Regiment was composed of ten companies. Companies "A" to "I" and "K".)
- Engagements: American Civil War

Commanders
- Colonel: Marsh B. Taylor
- Lt. Colonel: Thomas C. Dalby
- Major: James M. Watts

The 150th Indiana Infantry Regiment was an infantry regiment from Indiana that served in the Union Army between March 9 and August 5, 1865, during the American Civil War.

== Service ==
Recruited from the 8th district, the regiment was organized at Indianapolis, Indiana, with a strength of 1,082 men, and mustered in on March 9, 1865. It left Indiana for Harper's Ferry, West Virginia on March 13. The regiment saw duty at Charleston, West Virginia, Winchester, and Stevenson's Depot, remaining there until June 27. It then proceeded to Jordan's Springs, Virginia, and remained there until it was mustered out on August 5, 1865. During its service the regiment incurred thirty-four fatalities, and another fifty men deserted.

== See also ==
- List of Indiana Civil War regiments

== Bibliography ==
- Dyer, Frederick H. (1959). A Compendium of the War of the Rebellion. New York and London. Thomas Yoseloff, Publisher. LCCN 59-12963.
- Holloway, William R. (2004). Civil War Regiments From Indiana. eBookOnDisk.com Pensacola, Florida. ISBN 1-9321-5731-X.
- Terrell, W.H.H. (1867). The Report of the Adjutant General of the State of Indiana. Containing Rosters for the Years 1861–1865, Volume 7. Indianapolis, Indiana. Samuel M. Douglass, State Printer.
