= 145th Regiment =

145th Regiment may refer to:

- 145th Armored Regiment, United States
- 145th Aviation Regiment, United States
- 145th Field Artillery Regiment, United States
- 145th Regiment Royal Armoured Corps
- 145th (Berkshire Yeomanry) Field Regiment, Royal Artillery

== American Civil War regiments ==
- 145th Illinois Infantry Regiment
- 145th Indiana Infantry Regiment
- 145th New York Infantry Regiment
- 145th Ohio Infantry Regiment
- 145th Pennsylvania Infantry Regiment
