= 147th Regiment =

147th Regiment may refer to:

- 147th Regiment (United States), previously the 147th Infantry Regiment
- 147th Anti-Aircraft Missile Regiment, Soviet Union
- 147th Aviation Regiment, United States
- 147th Field Artillery Regiment, United States
- 147th Regiment Royal Armoured Corps

== American Civil War regiments ==
- 147th Illinois Infantry Regiment
- 147th Indiana Infantry Regiment
- 147th New York Infantry Regiment
- 147th Ohio Infantry Regiment
- 147th Pennsylvania Infantry Regiment

== See also ==
- 147th Brigade (disambiguation)
