= 158th Regiment =

158th Regiment may refer to:

- 158th Aviation Regiment, United States
- 158th Cavalry Regiment, United States
- 158th Field Artillery Regiment, United States
- 158th Infantry Regiment (United States)
- 158th Regiment Royal Armoured Corps
- 158 Regiment RLC

== American Civil War regiments ==
- 158th Indiana Infantry Regiment
- 158th New York Infantry Regiment
- 158th Pennsylvania Infantry Regiment

== See also ==
- 158th Division (disambiguation)
