= 159th Regiment =

159th Regiment may refer to:

- 159th Aviation Regiment (United States)
- 159th Fighter Aviation Regiment, Soviet Union
- 159th Guards Fighter Aviation Regiment, Soviet Union
- 159th Infantry Regiment (United States)
- 159th Regiment Royal Armoured Corps, Britain
- 159 Regiment RLC

== American Civil War regiments ==
- 159th Indiana Infantry Regiment
- 159th New York Infantry Regiment
- 159th Ohio Infantry Regiment

== See also ==
- 159th Division (disambiguation)
