= 141st Indiana Infantry Regiment =

- Active: July 18, 1864
- Country: United States
- Allegiance: Union
- Branch: Infantry
- Size: Regiment
- Engagements: American Civil War

The 141st Indiana Infantry Regiment was an infantry regiment from Indiana that failed to complete its organization to serve in the Union Army during the American Civil War. The enlisted men were transferred to the 140th Indiana Infantry Regiment.

== See also ==
- List of Indiana Civil War regiments

== Bibliography ==
- Dyer, Frederick H. (1959). A Compendium of the War of the Rebellion. New York and London. Thomas Yoseloff, Publisher. LCCN 59-12963.
- Holloway, William R. (2004). Civil War Regiments From Indiana. eBookOnDisk.com Pensacola, Florida. ISBN 1-9321-5731-X.
- Terrell, W.H.H. (1866). The Report of the Adjutant General of the State of Indiana. Containing Rosters for the Years 1861–1865, Volume 3. Indianapolis, Indiana. Samuel M. Douglass, State Printer.
