= 149th Regiment =

149th Regiment may refer to:

- 149th Armored Regiment, United States
- 149th Aviation Regiment, United States
- 149th Infantry Regiment (United States)
- 149th Regiment Royal Armoured Corps, Britain
- 149th (Lancashire Hussars) Regiment, Royal Horse Artillery, Britain
- 149th (Sherwood Foresters) Light Anti-Aircraft Regiment, Royal Artillery, Britain

== American Civil War regiments ==
- 149th Illinois Infantry Regiment
- 149th Indiana Infantry Regiment
- 149th New York Infantry Regiment
- 149th Ohio Infantry Regiment
- 149th Pennsylvania Infantry Regiment

== See also ==
- 149th Division (disambiguation)
