= 142nd Regiment =

142nd Regiment may refer to:

- 142nd Aviation Regiment
- 142nd Field Artillery Regiment
- 142nd Infantry Regiment (United States)
- 142nd Regiment Royal Armoured Corps

== American Civil War regiments ==
- 142nd Illinois Infantry Regiment
- 142nd Indiana Infantry Regiment
- 142nd New York Infantry Regiment
- 142nd Ohio Infantry Regiment
- 142nd Pennsylvania Infantry Regiment

== See also ==
- 142nd Division (disambiguation)
