= 6th Indiana Cavalry Regiment =

6th Regiment Indiana Cavalry
- Active: February 23, 1863 – September 15, 1865
- Country: United States
- Allegiance: Union
- Branch: Cavalry
- Engagements: Knoxville Campaign; Atlanta campaign Battle of Resaca; Battle of Dallas; Battle of New Hope Church; Battle of Allatoona; Battle of Kennesaw Mountain; Stoneman's Raid; Battle of Franklin; Battle of Nashville

The 6th Regiment Indiana Cavalry was a cavalry regiment that served in the Union Army during the American Civil War.

== Service ==
The 6th Indiana Cavalry was organized at Indianapolis, Indiana, beginning February 23, 1863, from men who served with the 71st Indiana Infantry under the command of Colonel James Biddle. The 71st Indiana Infantry had been captured and paroled twice during its brief existence. Company L was organized September 1, 1863, and Company M was organized October 12, 1863.

The regiment was attached to 1st Division, XXIII Corps, Lexington, Kentucky, Department of the Ohio to September 1863. Wilcox's Command, Left Wing, XXIII Corps, Department of the Ohio, to January 1864. District of the Clinch, Department of the Ohio, to April 1864. 2nd Brigade, 1st Division Cavalry Corps, Department of the Ohio, to May 1864. 1st Brigade, Cavalry Division, XXIII Corps, to July 1864. 2nd Brigade, Cavalry Division, XXIII Corps, to August 1864. Dismounted Brigade, Cavalry Division, XXIII Corps, to September 1864. 1st Brigade, Cavalry Division, XXIII Corps, to November 1864. 2nd Brigade, 6th Division, Wilson's Cavalry Corps, Military Division of Mississippi, to June 1865. District of Middle Tennessee, Department of the Cumberland, to September 1865.

The 6th Indiana Cavalry mustered out of service September 15, 1865.

== Detailed service ==
- Left Indiana for Kentucky August 26, 1863.
- Reconnaissance to Olympian Springs, Kentucky, October 8–11, 1863.
- Moved to Cumberland Gap, Tennessee. Knoxville Campaign November 4-December 23.
- Action at Lenoir Station November 14–15.
- Campbell's Station November 16.
- Siege of Knoxville November 17-December 5.
- Been's Station December 14.
- Lee County, Virginia, December 24.
- Big Springs January 19, 1864 (detachment).
- Tazewell January 24.
- Duty at Mt. Sterling and Nicholasville, Kentucky, until April.
- March from Nicholasville to Dalton, Georgia, April 29-May 11.
- Atlanta Campaign May to August.
- Demonstrations on Dalton May 9–13.
- Varnell's Station May 12.
- Battle of Resaca May 14–15.
- Pine Log Creek May 18.
- Etowah River, near Cartersville, May 20.
- Operations on line of Pumpkin Vine Creek and battles about Dallas, New Hope Church, and Allatoona Hills May 25-June 5.
- Allatoona Pass June 1–2.
- Lost Mountain June 9.
- Pine Mountain June 10.
- Operations about Marietta and against Kennesaw Mountain June 10-July 2.
- Lost Mountain June 11–17.
- Cheyney's Farm June 27.
- Assault on Kennesaw June 27.
- Nickajack Creek July 2–5.
- Chattahoochie River July 5–17.
- Sandtown July 6–7.
- Campbellton July 12–14.
- Turner's Ferry July 16 and 22.
- Siege of Atlanta July 22-August 25.
- Sweetwater July 23.
- Stoneman's Raid to Macon July 27-August 6.
- Macon and Clinton July 30.
- Hillsborough Sunshine Church July 30–31.
- Jug Tavern, Mulberry Creek, August 3.
- Moved to Nashville, Tennessee, August 28.
- Pursuit of Wheeler September 24-October 18.
- Pulaski, Tennessee, September 26–27.
- Waterloo, Alabama, October 3.
- Moved to Dalton, Georgia, November 1, and return to Nashville, Tennessee, November 26.
- Battle of Nashville December 15–16.
- Duty at Nashville until April 1, 1865. At Pulaski, Tennessee, and in middle Tennessee until September.

== Casualties ==
The regiment lost a total of 273 men during service; 4 officers and 66 enlisted men killed or mortally wounded, 2 officers and 201 enlisted men died of disease.

== Commanders ==
- Colonel James Biddle
- Major Jacob S. Stephens - commanded at the battles of Franklin and Nashville

== See also ==
- 71st Indiana Infantry Regiment
- List of Indiana Civil War regiments
- Indiana in the Civil War
