= 94th Indiana Infantry Regiment =

- Active: 1862
- Country: United States
- Allegiance: Union
- Branch: Infantry
- Size: Regiment
- Engagements: American Civil War

The 94th Indiana Infantry Regiment was an infantry regiment from Indiana that failed to complete its organization to serve in the Union Army during the American Civil War.

== See also ==
- List of Indiana Civil War regiments

== Bibliography ==
- Dyer, Frederick H. (1959). A Compendium of the War of the Rebellion. New York and London. Thomas Yoseloff, Publisher. LCCN 59-12963.
