= 6th Independent Battery Indiana Light Artillery =

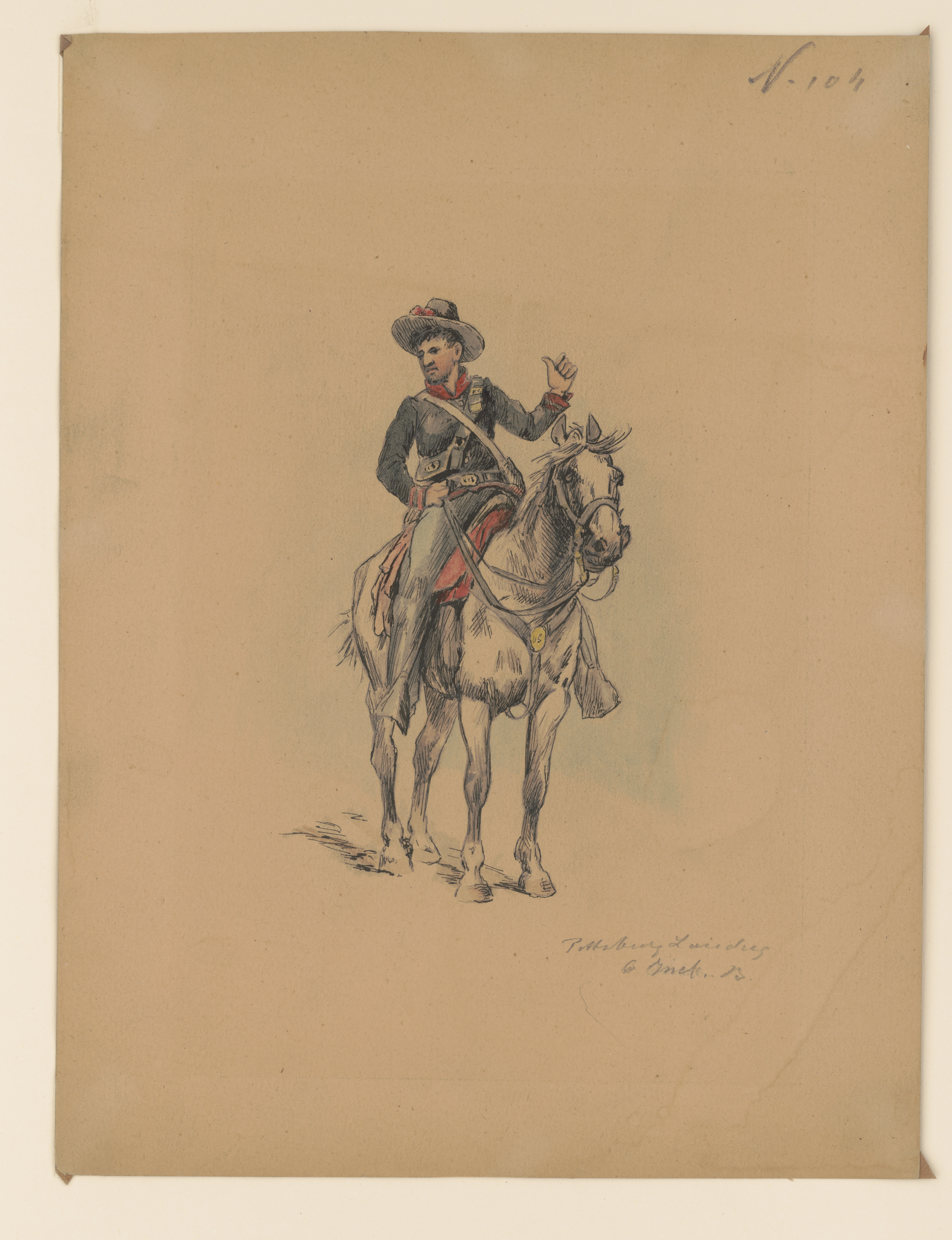
- Active: September 7, 1861 – July 22, 1865
- Country: United States
- Allegiance: Union
- Branch: Artillery
- Engagements: Battle of Shiloh; Siege of Corinth; Siege of Vicksburg

6th Indiana Battery Light Artillery was an artillery battery that served in the Union Army during the American Civil War.

== Service ==
The battery was organized at Evansville, Indiana and mustered in September 7, 1861, at Indianapolis, Indiana, for a three-year enlistment under the command of Captain Frederick Behr.

The battery was attached to District of Paducah, Kentucky, to March 1862. Artillery, 5th Division, Army of the Tennessee, to July 1862. Artillery, 5th Division, District of Memphis, Tennessee, to November 1862. Artillery, 1st Division, Right Wing, XIII Corps, Department of the Tennessee, to December 1862. Artillery, 1st Division, XVII Corps, to January 1863. Artillery, 1st Division, XVI Corps, to July 1863. Artillery, 3rd Division, XV Corps, to December 1863. Artillery, 1st Division, XVI Corps, to June 1864. 1st Brigade, Sturgis' Expedition, June 1864. Artillery, 1st Division, XVI Corps, to November 1864. 1st Brigade, Post and Defenses of Memphis, Tennessee, District of West Tennessee, to December 1864. Artillery Reserve, District of West Tennessee, to July 1865.

The 6th Indiana Battery Light Artillery mustered out of service on July 22, 1865.

== Detailed service ==
Left Indiana for Henderson, Kentucky, on October 2. Duty at Henderson Calhoun, South Carrollton, Owensboro, and Paducah, Kentucky, until March 1862.

They then moved from Paducah to Savannah, Tennessee, March 6–10. Expedition to Yellow Creek, Mississippi, and occupation of Pittsburg Landing, Tennessee, March 14–17. Battle of Shiloh, April 6–7. Advance on and siege of Corinth, Mississippi, April 29-May 30. March to Memphis, Tennessee, Juno 1-July 21, via Lagrange, Grand Junction, and Holly Springs. Action near Holly Springs July 1. Duty at Memphis, Tennessee, until November 26. Grant's Central Mississippi Campaign November 26, 1862 to January 10, 1863. Duty at Lagrange, Lafayette, and Colliersville, Tennessee, until June 1863. Moved to Memphis, Tennessee, June 9; then to Vicksburg, Mississippi. Siege of Vicksburg June 12-July 4. Advance on Jackson, Mississippi, July 4–10. Siege of Jackson July 10–17. Camp at Oak Ridge and Bear Creek until October 14. Expedition to Canton October 14–20. Bogue Chitto Creek October 17. Moved to Memphis, Tennessee, November; then to Lagrange and Pocahontas, and duty there until January 1864. Veteranized January 1, 1864. Moved to Vicksburg, Mississippi, January 31-February 3. Meridian Campaign February 3-March 2. Return to Memphis and duty there until June. Sturgis' Expedition to Guntown, Mississippi, June 1–13. Brice's (or Tishamingo) Creek, near Guntown, June 10. Smith's Expedition to Tupelo, Mississippi, July 5–21. Camargo's Cross Roads, near Harrisburg, July 13. Harrisburg, near Tupelo, July 14–15. Smith's Expedition to Oxford, Mississippi, August 1–30. Tallahatchie River August 7–9. Assigned to garrison duty at Memphis, Tennessee, September 1864 to July 1865.

== Casualties ==
The battery lost a total of 17 men during service; 1 officer and 1 enlisted men killed or mortally wounded, 15 enlisted men died of disease.

== Commanders ==
- Captain Frederick Behr - killed in action at the battle of Shiloh
- Captain Michael Mueller

== See also ==
- List of Indiana Civil War regiments
- Indiana in the Civil War
