= 155th Indiana Infantry Regiment =

- Active: April 18 – August 4, 1865
- Disbanded: August 4, 1865
- Country: United States
- Allegiance: Union
- Branch: Infantry
- Size: Regiment (Note: According to W.H.H. Terrell (1867), The Report of the Adjutant General of the State of Indiana. Containing Rosters for the Years 1861–1865, Volume 7, the 155th Indiana Infantry Regiment was composed of ten companies. Companies "A" to "I" and "K".)
- Engagements: American Civil War

Commanders
- Colonel: John M. Wilson
- Lt. Colonel: John D. McKahin
- Major: John C. Scantling

The 155th Indiana Infantry Regiment was an infantry regiment from Indiana that served in the Union Army between April 18 and August 4, 1865, during the American Civil War.

== Service ==
Composed of companies from the 9th, 10th and 11th districts, the regiment was organized at Indianapolis, Indiana, with a strength of 1,013 men and mustered in on April 18, 1865. It left Indiana for Washington, D.C., on April 26, from where it was sent to Alexandria, Virginia, and assigned to the Provisional Brigade, of the 3rd Division, 9th Army Corps. They were then moved to Dover, Delaware, on May 3, where companies were detached and proceeded to Centerville and Wilmington, Delaware, and Salisbury, Maryland. The regiment was reunited at Dover and was mustered out on August 4, 1865. During its service the regiment incurred fifteen fatalities, another sixty-eight men deserted and unaccounted for, seven men.

== See also ==
- List of Indiana Civil War regiments

== Bibliography ==
- Dyer, Frederick H. (1959). A Compendium of the War of the Rebellion. New York and London. Thomas Yoseloff, Publisher. LCCN 59-12963.
- Holloway, William R. (2004). Civil War Regiments From Indiana. eBookOnDisk.com Pensacola, Florida. ISBN 1-9321-5731-X.
- Terrell, W.H.H. (1867). The Report of the Adjutant General of the State of Indiana. Containing Rosters for the Years 1861–1865, Volume 7. Indianapolis, Indiana. Samuel M. Douglass, State Printer.
