= 104th Indiana Infantry Regiment =

- Active: July 10, 1863–July 18, 1863
- Disbanded: July 18, 1863
- Country: United States
- Allegiance: Union
- Branch: Infantry
- Size: Regiment
- Engagements: American Civil War

Commanders
- Colonel: James Gavin

The 104th Indiana Infantry Regiment was organized in Greensburg, Indiana, as one of thirteen "Minute Men" regiments and a battalion formed for emergency service during Morgan's Raid into Indiana during the American Civil War. On July 8, 1863, after Confederate General John Hunt Morgan crossed the Ohio River into southern Indiana, governor Oliver P. Morton called for volunteers to defend the state. Within forty-eight hours 65,000 men had volunteered their services. The 104th mustered into service at Greensburg on July 10, 1863, under the command of Colonel James Gavin. The regiment included six companies of "Minute Men" and four companies from the Indiana Legion, the state's militia. The majority of the men from the 104th came from Marion County, Decatur County, Fayette County, and Dearborn County, Indiana. During its brief term of service, the 104th marched from Greensburg to Lawrenceburg, Indiana, by way of Sunman's Station, before heading toward Harrison, Ohio. After the threat to Indiana ended on July 14, when it was confirmed that Morgan had entered Ohio, the 104th returned to Greensburg and mustered out of service on July 18, 1863. Morgan was captured in eastern Ohio on July 26, 1863.

== See also ==
- List of Indiana Civil War regiments
- Indiana in the American Civil War
