= 135th Indiana Infantry Regiment =

- Active: May 23 – September 29, 1864
- Disbanded: September 29, 1864
- Country: United States
- Allegiance: Union
- Branch: Infantry
- Size: Regiment
- Engagements: American Civil War

The 135th Indiana Infantry Regiment served in the Union Army between May 23 and September 29, 1864, during the American Civil War.

== Service ==
The regiment was organized at Indianapolis, Indiana and mustered in on May 23, 1864. It was ordered to Tennessee and Alabama for railroad guard duty, until late September 1864. The regiment was mustered out on September 29, 1864. During its service the regiment lost twenty-eight men to disease.

== See also ==
- List of Indiana Civil War regiments

== Bibliography ==
- Dyer, Frederick H. (1959). A Compendium of the War of the Rebellion. New York and London. Thomas Yoseloff, Publisher. LCCN 59-12963.
