= 4th Independent Battery Indiana Light Artillery =

- Active: September 20, 1861 – October 4, 1864; October 14, 1864, to August 1, 1865
- Country: United States
- Allegiance: Union
- Branch: Artillery
- Engagements: Siege of Corinth; Battle of Perryville; Battle of Stones River; Tullahoma Campaign; Battle of Chickamauga; Siege of Chattanooga; Battle of Nashville

4th Indiana Battery Light Artillery was an artillery battery that served in the Union Army during the American Civil War. It was often referred to as "Bush's Battery".

== Service ==
The battery was organized at Indianapolis, Indiana and mustered in for a three-year enlistment on September 30, 1861. It was mustered in under the command of Captain Asahel Kidder Bush.

The battery served unattached, Army of the Ohio, to June 1862. Artillery Reserve, Army of the Ohio, to July 1862. 7th Independent Brigade, Army of the Ohio, to August 1862. 28th Brigade, 3rd Division, Army of the Ohio, to September 1862. 28th Brigade, 3rd Division, I Corps, Army of the Ohio, to November 1862. 1st Brigade, 3rd Division, Right Wing, XIV Corps, Army of the Cumberland, to January 1863. Artillery, 3rd Division, XX Corps, Army of the Cumberland, to October 1863. Artillery, 1st Division, XIV Corps, October 1863. 2nd Division, Artillery Reserve, Department of the Cumberland, to November 1863. Garrison Artillery, Chattanooga, Tennessee, Department of the Cumberland, to October 1864. Garrison Artillery, Nashville, Tennessee, Department of the Cumberland, to December 1864, and at Murfreesboro, Tennessee, until July 1865.

Veterans and recruits to the battery were transferred to the 7th Indiana Battery Light Artillery on September 21, 1864. The 4th Indiana Battery Light Artillery mustered out of service on October 6, 1864. The battery was reorganized on October 14, 1864, and continued in service until August 1, 1865, when it mustered out at Indianapolis.

== Detailed service ==
Ordered to Louisville, Kentucky, October 4. Duty at New Haven and Munfordville, Kentucky, until February 1862. Advance on Nashville, Tennessee, February 10-March 3, 1862. March to Savannah, Tennessee, March 17-April 7. Advance on and siege of Corinth, Mississippi, April 29-May 30. Pursuit to Booneville May 31-June 6. Buell's Campaign in northern Alabama and middle Tennessee June to August. March to Louisville, Kentucky, in pursuit of Bragg August 21-September 26. Pursuit of Bragg into Kentucky October 1–15. Battle of Perryville, October 8. March to Nashville, Tennessee, October 20-November 9, and duty there till December 26. Advance on Murfreesboro December 26–30. Battle of Stones River December 30–31, 1862 and January 1–3, 1863. Duty at Murfreesboro until June. Expedition toward Columbia March 4–14. Tullahoma Campaign June 23-July 7. Hoover's Gap June 24–26. Occupation of middle Tennessee until August 16. Passage of Cumberland Mountains and the Tennessee River and Chickamauga Campaign August 16-September 22. Davis Crossroads or Dug Gap September 21. Battle of Chickamauga September 19–20. Rossville Gap September 21. Siege of Chattanooga, Tennessee, September 24-November 23. Chattanooga-Ringgold Campaign November 23–27. Garrison duty at Chattanooga until September, 1864. Moved to Nashville, Tennessee, October 28 and duty there until December. Battle of Nashville December 15–16. Moved to Murfreesboro, Tennessee, and garrison duty at Fort Rosecrans until July 1865. Moved to Nashville, Tennessee; then to Indianapolis, July 19.

== Casualties ==
The battery lost a total of 28 men during service; 12 enlisted men killed or mortally wounded, 1 officer and 15 enlisted men died of disease.

== Commanders ==
- Captain Asahel Kidder Bush
- Captain Benjamin F. Johnson
- Lieutenant David Flansburg - commanded at the battle of Chickamauga
- Lieutenant Henry J. Willits - commanded at the battle of Chickamauga

== See also ==
- List of Indiana Civil War regiments
- Indiana in the Civil War
