= 154th Indiana Infantry Regiment =

- Active: April 20 – August 4, 1865
- Disbanded: August 4, 1865
- Country: United States
- Allegiance: Union
- Branch: Infantry
- Size: Regiment (Note: According to W.H.H. Terrell (1867), The Report of the Adjutant General of the State of Indiana. Containing Rosters for the Years 1861–1865, Volume 7, the 154th Indiana Infantry Regiment was composed of ten companies. Companies "A" to "I" and "K".)
- Engagements: American Civil War

Commanders
- Colonel: Frank Wilcox
- Lt. Colonel: John P. Gapen
- Major: John D. Simpson

The 154th Indiana Infantry Regiment was an infantry regiment from Indiana that served in the Union Army between April 20 and August 4, 1865, during the American Civil War.

== Service ==
The regiment was organized at infantry regiment, with a strength of 982 men and mustered in on April 20, 1865. It left Indiana for Parkersburg, West Virginia on April 28. Between May 2 and 4, the regiment moved to Stevenson's Station, Shenandoah Valley, Virginia. They performed duty at Stevenson's Station until June 27, and then at Opequan Creek. On August 4, 1865, the regiment was mustered out. During its service the regiment incurred forty fatalities, another eighty-four men deserted and unaccounted for, one man.

== See also ==
- List of Indiana Civil War regiments

== Bibliography ==
- Dyer, Frederick H. (1959). A Compendium of the War of the Rebellion. New York and London. Thomas Yoseloff, Publisher. LCCN 59-12963.
- Holloway, William R. (2004). Civil War Regiments From Indiana. eBookOnDisk.com Pensacola, Florida. ISBN 1-9321-5731-X.
- Terrell, W.H.H. (1867). The Report of the Adjutant General of the State of Indiana. Containing Rosters for the Years 1861–1865, Volume 7. Indianapolis, Indiana. Samuel M. Douglass, State Printer.
