= 133rd Indiana Infantry Regiment =

- Active: May 17 – September 5, 1864
- Disbanded: September 5, 1864
- Country: United States
- Branch: Infantry
- Size: Regiment
- Engagements: American Civil War

The 133rd Indiana Infantry Regiment served in the Union Army between May 17 and September 5, 1864, during the American Civil War.

== Service ==
The regiment was organized at Indianapolis, Indiana and mustered in on May 17, 1864. It was ordered to Tennessee and assigned duty at Bridgeport, Alabama as well as railroad guard duty, until early September 1864. The regiment was mustered out on September 5, 1864. During its service the regiment lost seventeen men to disease.

== See also ==
- List of Indiana Civil War regiments

== Bibliography ==
- Dyer, Frederick H. (1959). A Compendium of the War of the Rebellion. New York and London. Thomas Yoseloff, Publisher. LCCN 59-12963.
