= 105th Indiana Infantry Regiment =

Part of the Union Army in the American Civil War

- Flag of the United States, 1863–1865.
- Active: July 12, 1863 - July 18, 1863
- Country: United States
- Allegiance: United States; Indiana
- Branch: Union Army
- Type: Infantry & Militia
- Engagements: American Civil War: Morgan's Raid

Commanders
- Colonel: Kline Godfrey Shryock
- Lieutenant Colonel: John M. Hartley
- Major: Robert E. Smith

The 105th Indiana Infantry Regiment was a volunteer infantry regiment that served in the Union Army during the American Civil War.

== Service ==
The regiment was organized on July 12, 1863, in order to repel Morgan's Raid into Indiana. The regiment was mustered out July 18, 1863.

Original Organization of Regiment
Company	Primary Place of Recruitment	Earliest Captain
A	Henry County	Henry Hatch
B	Union County	Sylas (Silas) Douglas Byram
C	Henry County	Edward R. Bladen
D	Union County	Jacob A. Jackson
E	Hancock County	Alexander K. Branham
F	Wayne County	Jonathan Jarrett
G	Clinton County	Milton B. Waugh
H	Madison County	William Nickelson
I	Randolph County	John A. Hunt
K	Henry County	William M. Sharp

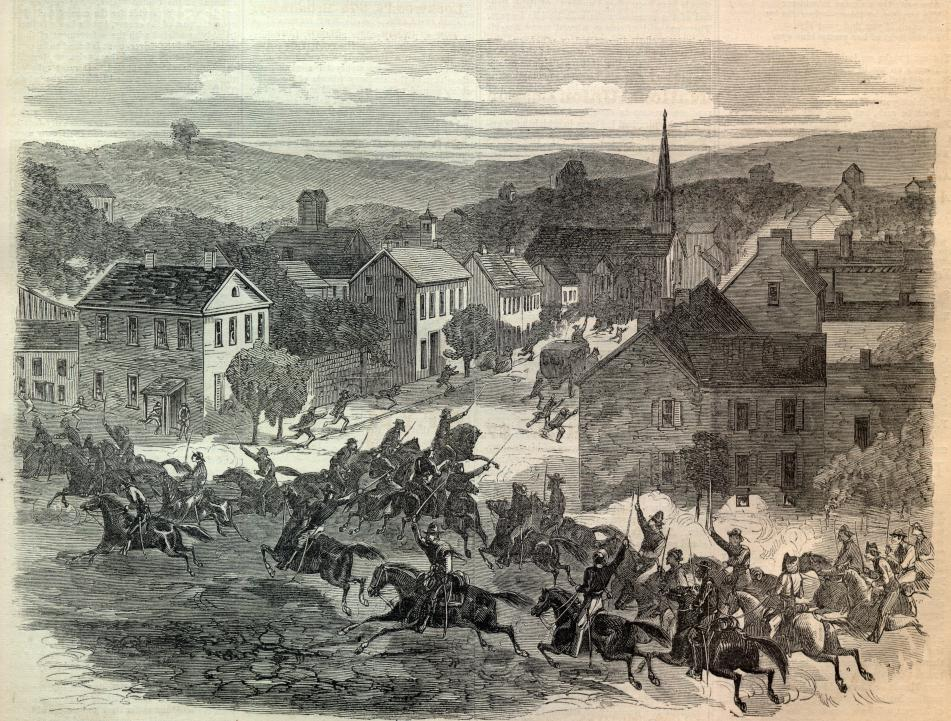
Morgan's Raiders enter Old Washington, Ohio.

== Casualties ==
The regiment lost a total of only 6 men: 1 Officer and 3 Enlisted men were killed in action while 2 enlisted men deserted.

== Commanders ==
- Kline Godfrey Shryock: June 12, 1863 - June 18, 1863.

== Notable people ==
- Kline Godfrey Shryock: Shryock lived in Rochester, Indiana before the war and had previously served as the Colonel of the 87th Indiana Infantry Regiment.
- Milton Byron Waugh: Waugh served as the Captain of Company G. Waugh was a farmer and stock raiser who lived in Colfax, Indiana. He was the son of the early pioneers Milo and Elizabeth Waugh of Ross County, Ohio.
