= 153rd Indiana Infantry Regiment =

- Active: March 1 – September 4, 1865
- Disbanded: September 4, 1865
- Country: United States
- Allegiance: Union
- Branch: Infantry
- Size: Regiment (Note: According to W.H.H. Terrell (1867), The Report of the Adjutant General of the State of Indiana. Containing Rosters for the Years 1861–1865, Volume 7, the 153rd Indiana Infantry Regiment was composed of ten companies. Companies "A" to "I" and "K".)
- Engagements: American Civil War

Commanders
- Colonel: Oliver H.P. Carey
- Lt. Colonel: Charles S. Ellis
- Major: James F. Wildman

The 153rd Indiana Infantry Regiment was an infantry regiment from Indiana that served in the Union Army between March 1 and September 4, 1865, during the American Civil War.

== Service ==
The regiment was organized at Indianapolis, with a strength of 1,033 men and mustered in on March 1, 1865. It left Indiana for Nashville, Tennessee on March 5. While en route the regiment was stopped at Louisville, Kentucky, and ordered to proceed to Russellville, Kentucky, while a detachment went to Lyon County on April 29. Companies "D", "G", and "H", were involved in numerous operations against guerrilla fighters in the vicinity of Russellville until June. The regiment returned to Louisville, Ky., on June 16, where it saw duty at Taylor Barracks until early September. The regiment was mustered out on September 4, 1865. During its service the regiment suffered forty-seven fatalities, another seventy-nine men deserted and unaccounted for, two men.

== See also ==
- List of Indiana Civil War regiments

== Bibliography ==
- Dyer, Frederick H. (1959). A Compendium of the War of the Rebellion. New York and London. Thomas Yoseloff, Publisher. LCCN 59-12963.
- Holloway, William R. (2004). Civil War Regiments From Indiana. eBookOnDisk.com Pensacola, Florida. ISBN 1-9321-5731-X.
- Terrell, W.H.H. (1867). The Report of the Adjutant General of the State of Indiana. Containing Rosters for the Years 1861–1865, Volume 7. Indianapolis. Samuel M. Douglass, State Printer.
