= 137th Indiana Infantry Regiment =

- Active: May 26 – September 21, 1864
- Disbanded: September 21, 1864
- Country: United States
- Allegiance: Union
- Branch: Infantry
- Size: Regiment
- Engagements: American Civil War

The 137th Indiana Infantry Regiment served in the Union Army between May 26 and September 21, 1864, during the American Civil War.

== Service ==
The regiment was organized at Indianapolis, Indiana and mustered in on May 26, 1864. It was ordered to Tennessee and Alabama for railroad guard duty, until late September 1864. The regiment was mustered out on September 21, 1864. During its service the regiment lost seventeen men to disease.

== See also ==
- List of Indiana Civil War regiments

== Bibliography ==
- Dyer, Frederick H. (1959). A Compendium of the War of the Rebellion. New York and London. Thomas Yoseloff, Publisher. LCCN 59-12963.
