= 78th Indiana Infantry Regiment =

78th Regiment Indiana Infantry
- Active: August 5, 1862 – October 3, 1862
- Country: United States
- Allegiance: Union
- Branch: Infantry
- Engagements: Battle of Munfordville (Company K)

The 78th Regiment Indiana Infantry was an infantry regiment that served in the Union Army during the American Civil War.

== Service ==
The 78th Indiana Infantry was organized at Indianapolis, Indiana for 60-day service and mustered in on August 5, 1862, under the command of Lieutenant Colonel William L. Farrow.

The regiment was engaged in guard duty at Evansville, Indiana and operated against guerrillas in Kentucky until October 3, 1862. Part of the regiment was engaged at Uniontown, Kentucky on September 1, 1862. Company K was detached and became engaged at the Battle of Munfordville, where it was captured with the Union garrison.

The 78th Indiana Infantry mustered out of service on October 3, 1862.

== Casualties ==
The regiment lost a total of 5 men during service; 1 officer and 1 enlisted man killed, 3 enlisted men died of disease.

== Commanders ==
- Lieutenant Colonel William L. Farrow

== See also ==
- List of Indiana Civil War regiments
- Indiana in the Civil War
