= 132nd Indiana Infantry Regiment =

- Active: May 18 – September 7, 1864
- Disbanded: September 7, 1864
- Country: United States
- Allegiance: Union
- Branch: Infantry
- Size: Regiment
- Engagements: American Civil War

The 132nd Indiana Infantry Regiment served in the Union Army between May 18 and September 7, 1864, during the American Civil War.

== Service ==
The regiment was organized at Indianapolis, Indiana and mustered in on May 18, 1864. Once mustered in, it was ordered to Tennessee on May 18, and assigned to duty guarding the railroad at both Stevenson, Alabama, till July and at Nashville, Tennessee, till early September. The regiment was mustered out on September 7, 1864. During its service the regiment lost twelve men to disease.

== See also ==
- List of Indiana Civil War regiments

== Bibliography ==
- Dyer, Frederick H. (1959). A Compendium of the War of the Rebellion. New York and London. Thomas Yoseloff, Publisher. LCCN 59-12963.
