= 25th Independent Battery Indiana Light Artillery =

- Active: September 4, 1864 – July 20, 1865
- Country: United States
- Allegiance: Union
- Branch: Artillery
- Engagements: Battle of Nashville

25th Indiana Battery Light Artillery was an artillery battery that served in the Union Army during the American Civil War.

== Service ==
The battery was organized at Indianapolis, Indiana September 4 through November 28, 1864, under the command of Captain Frederick C. Sturm.

The battery was attached to Artillery Brigade, IV Corps, Army of the Cumberland, to February 1865. Unattached Artillery, Department of the Cumberland, to March 1865. Garrison Artillery, Decatur, Alabama, to July 1865.

The 25th Indiana Battery Light Artillery mustered out of service on July 20, 1865, in Indianapolis.

== Detailed service ==
Left Indiana for Nashville, Tennessee, November 28. Battle of Nashville, December 15–16, 1864. Pursuit of Hood to the Tennessee River December 17–28. Duty at Huntsville, Alabama, January 4 to February 3, 1865. Moved to Decatur, Alabama, February 3, and garrison duty there until July 11. Ordered to Indiana July 11.

== Casualties ==
The battery lost a total of 7 enlisted men during service; 1 man killed and 6 men due to disease.

== Commanders ==
- Captain Frederick C. Sturm

== See also ==
- List of Indiana Civil War regiments
- Indiana in the Civil War
