= 146th Indiana Infantry Regiment =

- Active: March 9 – August 31, 1865
- Disbanded: August 31, 1865
- Country: United States
- Allegiance: Union
- Branch: Infantry
- Size: Regiment (Note: According to W.H.H. Terrell (1867), The Report of the Adjutant General of the State of Indiana. Containing Rosters for the Years 1861–1865, Volume 7, the 146th Indiana Infantry Regiment was composed of ten companies. Companies "A" to "I" and "K".)
- Engagements: American Civil War

Commanders
- Colonel: Merit C. Welch
- Lt. Colonel: Theophilus W. Morrison
- Major: Thomas P. Spillman

The 146th Indiana Infantry Regiment was an infantry regiment from Indiana that served in the Union Army between March 9 and August 31, 1865, during the American Civil War.

== Service ==
The regiment was organized at Indianapolis, Indiana, with a strength of 979 men and mustered in on March 9, 1865. It left Indiana for Harper's Ferry, West Virginia on March 11. It was then attached to the 1st Brigade, 3rd Provisional Division, Army of the Shenandoah. It saw duty at Charleston and Summit Point, West Virginia and also at Winchester, Stevenson's Depot, Jordan Springs, Virginia, until July 27.

It was then ordered to Baltimore, Maryland, where it was assigned to duty in the Military district of Delaware. One company was detached for duty at each of the following: Hicks' general hospital, Baltimore. Havre de Grace, Dover. Wilmington, Delaware. Salisbury and Eastern Maryland. The regiment was mustered out on August 31, 1865. During its service the regiment incurred twenty-nine fatalities, another thirty deserted and seven unaccounted for.

== See also ==
- List of Indiana Civil War regiments

== Bibliography ==
- Dyer, Frederick H. (1959). A Compendium of the War of the Rebellion. New York and London. Thomas Yoseloff, Publisher. LCCN 59-12963.
- Holloway, William R. (2004). Civil War Regiments From Indiana. eBookOnDisk.com Pensacola, Florida. ISBN 1-9321-5731-X.
- Terrell, W.H.H. (1867). The Report of the Adjutant General of the State of Indiana. Containing Rosters for the Years 1861–1865, Volume 7. Indianapolis, Indiana. Samuel M. Douglass, State Printer.
