= 152nd Indiana Infantry Regiment =

- Active: March 16 – August 30, 1865
- Disbanded: August 30, 1865
- Country: United States
- Allegiance: Union
- Branch: Infantry
- Size: Regiment (Note: According to W.H.H. Terrell (1867), The Report of the Adjutant General of the State of Indiana. Containing Rosters for the Years 1861–1865, Volume 7, the 152nd Indiana Infantry Regiment was composed of ten companies. Companies "A" to "I" and "K".)
- Engagements: American Civil War

Commanders
- Colonel: Whedon W. Griswold
- Lt. Colonel: Joseph W. Whitaker
- Major: Julius Walschmidt

The 152nd Indiana Infantry Regiment was an infantry regiment from Indiana that served in the Union Army between March 16 and August 30, 1865, during the American Civil War.

== Service ==
The regiment was recruited from the 9th, 10th, and 11th districts and organized at Indianapolis, Indiana, with a strength of 988 men. It was mustered in on March 16, 1865, and left Indiana for Harper's Ferry, West Virginia on March 18. At Harper's Ferry, it was assigned to duty with one of the provisional divisions of the Army of Shenandoah. The regiment saw duty at Charleston, Stevenson's Station, Summit Point and Clarksburg, West Virginia, until late August 1865. The regiment was mustered out on August 30, 1865. During its service the regiment incurred forty-eight fatalities, and another twenty-two men deserted.

== See also ==
- List of Indiana Civil War regiments

== Bibliography ==
- Dyer, Frederick H. (1959). A Compendium of the War of the Rebellion. New York and London. Thomas Yoseloff, Publisher. LCCN 59-12963.
- Holloway, William R. (2004). Civil War Regiments From Indiana. eBookOnDisk.com Pensacola, Florida. ISBN 1-9321-5731-X.
- Terrell, W.H.H. (1867). The Report of the Adjutant General of the State of Indiana. Containing Rosters for the Years 1861–1865, Volume 7. Indianapolis, Indiana. Samuel M. Douglass, State Printer.
