= 54th Indiana Infantry Regiment =

54th Indiana Infantry
- Flag of the United States, 1863-1865
- Active: October 28, 1862 - December 8, 1863
- Country: United States of America
- Allegiance: Union Army
- Branch: Army
- Type: Infantry
- Engagements: Arkansas Post, Arkansas; Big Black River, Mississippi; Bolton's Depot, Mississippi; Bovina Station, Mississippi; Champion Hill, Mississippi; Chickasaw Bayou, Mississippi; Clinton, Mississippi; Edward's Depot, Mississippi; Grand Gulf, Mississippi; Jackson, Mississippi; Port Gibson, Mississippi; Raymond, Mississippi; Vicksburg, Mississippi

Commanders
- Colonel of the Regiment: Fielding Mansfield

The 54th Indiana Infantry, an American Civil War regiment, was organized at Indianapolis, Indiana, on October 28, 1862, with Fielding Mansfield as colonel, and it was made up mostly of volunteers from all over the state. In December, the regiment left for Memphis, Tennessee.

The one-year regiment was organized into 10 companies of infantry and a Field and Staff entity in the fall of 1862. One company mustered into service on October 28, five on October 30, and two each on November 8 and 16, 1862. Like most regiments organized in Indiana at that time, there was a three-month regiment that preceded it; however, while most of the three-month regiments later formed into three-year regiments, the 54th Indiana became a one-year regiment. Several regiments organized immediately before and after the 54th Indiana became three-year organizations.

One year's service was not the only unique attribute of the 54th Indiana. The men in the regiment did not muster out in the same companies that they mustered into (Indiana Adjutant General's Report, Volume 8, vice Volume 7 when mustered in).

Company B mustered out as Company H
Company C mustered out as Company D
Company D mustered out as Company C
Company E mustered out as Company B
Company G mustered out as Company E
Company H mustered out as Company I
Company I mustered out as Company G

Companies A, F and K mustered out in the same company they mustered into.

== Organization ==
- Company A: The company was organized by Captain John W. Thomas at Madison, Indiana, in October 1862 and then marched to Indianapolis, where it arrived October 15, a distance of 86 miles. Stationed at Chickasaw Bluffs, October 28 – December 31, 1862. Stationed at Young's Point, January–February 1863. Stationed in the field, March–April 1863. Stationed at Richmond, Louisiana, April 10, 1863. Stationed at Big Black River, Mississippi, May–June 1863. Stationed at Carrollton, Louisiana, July–August 1863. Stationed at New Orleans, Louisiana [Brashear City], September–October 1863. Stationed at New Orleans, Louisiana, December 8, 1863.

The other company officers were First Lieutenant Absolom Thomas and Second Lieutenant James Lochridge.

- Company B: The company was organized by Captain John V. Bowman at Cambridge City, Indiana, in October 1862 and then marched to Indianapolis. Stationed at Burnside Barracks at Indianapolis, Indiana, departed for Memphis, Tennessee, on December 9, 1862, and arrived at Cairo the next day. In the evening embarked on Ohio Belleand arrived at Memphis on the night of December 11. December 12–20 went into Camp Morgan. Remained there until December 20, when they were ordered on board the Crescent City. Left Memphis the same night. December 21–26 arrived at Helena at 8 a.m. Left Helena the same evening. Steamed down the river and arrived at the mouth of the Yazoo [River] December 26. Lay there a few hours, then sailed up the Yazoo twelve miles to a plantation. Landed about noon, when their brigade formed and skirmished with the Confederates. Drove them back, after which they returned to the fleet. December 27 the whole division moved forward toward Vicksburg. Met the enemy in the evening. Engaged them and drove them back. At night bivouacked on the field. December 28 the battle resumed. Charged the enemy about 11 o'clock. Drove them back to the bluffs. December 29 lay on our arms on the field. Battle resumed early. Charged the enemy's breastworks about 2 p.m. but were forced to retreat. December 30–31 encamped on the battlefield.

January 2–8 retreated from Chickasaw Bluffs on the night of January 2 and went aboard boats. Sailed up the river; landed at the mouth of White River January 8. January 9 sailed up White River. Took the cut-off across the Arkansas River. Landed on the same evening at Fletcher's Farm. January 10–11 sailed up the river about three miles; landed and marched towards [Arkansas] Post and encamped for the night. Fighting was resumed early the next morning in front. Ordered forward aboard about 3 o'clock, when Rebels surrendered. January 18–20 encamped at the post until January 18, when they got on the boats and sailed down the river and landed at Young's Point on the evening of January 20. January 22 went into camp at Blake's Plantation, where they remained until March.

Stationed in the field, March–April 1863 March 7–8 struck tents at Young's Point; embarked on steamer same evening. Landed at Miliken's Bend early the next morning. Disembarked and went into camp. April 5–20 remained until April 5, when they marched south to Raymond and marched at intervals. Stationed at Richmond, Louisiana, April 10, 1863; moved south, and reached Perkins' Plantation April 20. April 28–29 embarked on boats April 28; reached Grand Gulf the same day. Disembarked April 29. Marched around the Gulf. April 30 embarked on boats and landed the same day at Bruinsburg Landing. Started same evening for Port Gibson.

Stationed, but not engaged at Big Black River, Mississippi, May–June 1863, Engaged at Jackson, Mississippi, July 10–14, 1863. Stationed at Carrollton, Louisiana, July - August 1863, and Brashear City, Louisiana, September–October 1863.

The other company officers were First Lieutenant Paris Julian and Second Lieutenant Rufus C. Carpenter.

- Company C: The company was organized by Captain Beckford at Marion, Grant County, Indiana, in October 1862 and then marched to Indianapolis, where it arrived October 16, a distance of 88 miles. December 9–10 marched from Burnside Barracks at Indianapolis, Indiana, to Union Depot. Went aboard cars. Reached Cairo, Illinois December 10. Got aboard the Ohio Belle; ran down the Mississippi River to Memphis, Tennessee. Went into camp above the city in Chelsea Woods. December 20 went on board the steamer Crescent City; ran down the river to the mouth of the Yazoo; thence up the same twelve miles. Landed; drove in the enemy pickets and bivouacked for the night. December 27 moved forward and the enemy retired. December 28 drove the enemy to their fortifications. December 29–31 drove upon the enemy fortifications. Was repulsed and on the night of December 31 withdrew from the field and went aboard the steamer Lady Jackson.

Stationed at Young's Point, Louisiana, January–February 1863. Ran up the Mississippi River to the mouth of White River, then up White River to the Pass into the Arkansas River, then up said river within ten miles of Arkansas Post. Landed and was on the reserve in the fight that captured the Rebel forces in that Fort. Went aboard boats; ran down Arkansas River to Napoleon at the mouth of said river on the Mississippi River. January 17–23 Landed, then went down to Young's Point, Louisiana. Landed and went into camp January 23.

Stationed in the field, March–April 1863. Stationed at Richmond, Louisiana, April 10, 1863. Stationed in the field, Big Black River, Mississippi, May–June 1863. Stationed at Carrollton, Louisiana, July–August 1863. Stationed at Brashear City, Louisiana, September–October 1863. Stationed at New Orleans, Louisiana, December 8, 1863.

The other company officers were First Lieutenant John A. Howard and Second Lieutenant Joseph Lugar.

- Company D: The company was organized by Captain Albert Eggleston at Plymouth, Indiana, in October 1862 and then marched to Indianapolis, where it arrived October 15. December 9–11 left Indianapolis, place of rendezvous; reached Memphis, Tennessee, December 11. December 20–25 on board steamer Crescent City for Vicksburg. Arrived at the mouth of the Yazoo River December 25. December 26 disembarked ten miles above the mouth of the river. Skirmished Friday afternoon with the enemy at Chickasaw Bayou, being in [John F.] De Courcey's Brigade, Third Division. December 27–29 on Saturday, December 27, Sunday, December 28 and Monday December 29, was respectively engaged in action with the enemy at Chickasaw Bayou near Vicksburg, being in the front in the charges made on Sunday, December 28 and Monday, December 29. January 1, 1863, returned to the fleet.

Stationed at Young's Point, Louisiana, January–February 1863. January 2–8 started up the river to the White River, and up that river, crossing through the cut-off into Arkansas River, and up the Arkansas River, arriving at a point 35 miles from the mouth of the river at a place called Arkansas Post on the evening of January 8. January 9 disembarked, and marched for Arkansas Post, a distance of four miles, but was not engaged in the battle. Entered the Fort at about 4 p.m., the enemy having surrendered at 3 p.m. same day. January 16–21 left Arkansas Post on the steamer War Eagle for Vicksburg, arriving at the mouth of the Yazoo River on January 21. January 23 disembarked on the morning of January 23 and encamped on the Louisiana shore. Stationed in the field, March–April 1863. Stationed at Richmond, Louisiana, April 10, 1863. Stationed in the field, Big Black River, Mississippi, May - June 1863. Stationed at Carrollton, Louisiana, July–August 1863. Stationed at New Orleans, Louisiana, December 8, 1863.

The other company officers were First Lieutenant Eli R. Shook and Second Lieutenant Isaac B. McGogy (McGoggy).

- Company E: The company was organized by Captain Andrew J. Lyon at State Line City, Indiana, in October 1862 and then marched to Indianapolis, where it arrived October 16, a distance of 105 miles. Stationed at Chickasaw Bluffs, October 30 – December 31, 1862. Stationed in the field, March–April 1863. Stationed at Richmond, Louisiana, April 10, 1863. Stationed at Big Black River, Mississippi, May–June 1863. Stationed at Carrollton, Louisiana, July–August 1863. Stationed at New Orleans, Louisiana, December 8, 1863.

The other company officers were First Lieutenant William Hall and Second Lieutenant William W. Massena.

- Company F: The company was organized by Captain William H. Neff at North Salem, Indiana, in October 1862 and then marched to Indianapolis, where it arrived October 15, a distance of 30 miles. Stationed at Chickasaw Bluffs, October 28 – December 31, 1862. Stationed at Young's Point, January–February 1863. (For record of events, see Company D.) January 2—Started on board steamer Lady Jackson. Stationed at Big Black River, Mississippi, Mar–April 1863. Stationed at Richmond, Louisiana, April 10, 1863. Stationed at Big Black River, Mississippi, May–June 1863. Stationed at Carrollton, Louisiana, July–August 1863. Stationed at Brashear City, Louisiana, September–October 1863. Stationed at New Orleans, Louisiana, December 8, 1863.

The other company officers were First Lieutenant David D. Jones and Second Lieutenant Benjamin F. Davis.

- Company G: The company was organized by Captain Henry Carter at Winchester, Indiana, in October 1862 and then marched to Indianapolis.

The other company officers were First Lieutenant Samuel P. Strahan and Second Lieutenant William P. Beeber.

- Company H: The company was organized by Captain Oliver M. Wilson at Indianapolis, Indiana, in October 1862.

The other company officers were First Lieutenant William M. Conner and Second Lieutenant Josiah Ralston.

- Company I: The company was organized by Captain John H. Ferree at Rushville, Indiana, in October 1862 and then marched to Indianapolis.

The other company officers were First Lieutenant John W. Manzy and Second Lieutenant William M. Brooks.

- Company K: The company was organized by Captain Samuel J. Willson's at West Point, Indiana, in October 1862 and then marched to Indianapolis, Indiana, where it arrived October 16, a distance of 75 miles.

The other company officers were First Lieutenant Samuel R. Fielder and Second Lieutenant Thomas B. Lawe.

== See also ==
- List of Indiana Civil War regiments
