= Stewart's Independent Cavalry Company (Indiana) =

American Civil War volunteer company

Stewart's Independent Cavalry Company Company I, 1st Indiana Cavalry Regiment
- Flag of the United States, 1863–1865.
- Active: July 4, 1861 - May 31, 1865
- Allegiance: United States of America; Union
- Branch: Union
- Type: Cavalry
- Size: 1 Company of Cavalry
- Engagements: American Civil War: Battle of Rich Mountain; Battle of Corrick's Ford; First Battle of Bull Run; Battle of Carnifex Ferry; Battle of Cheat Mountain; Battle of Gettysburg

Commanders
- Captain: Robert R. Stewart

Stewart's Independent Cavalry Company also known as Company I, 1st Indiana Cavalry Regiment was a volunteer cavalry company and detachment that served in the Union Army during the American Civil War.

== Service ==
The unit which would become Stewart's Independent Cavalry Company was originally raised and organized in Terre Haute, Indiana as Company I of the 1st Indiana Cavalry Regiment (28th Indiana Infantry Regiment) on April 25, 1861. The company was mustered into federal service on July 4, 1861, and assigned to 1st Indiana Cavalry Regiment as Company I, but served detached from the Regiment for the entirety of the war in the Eastern theater of the American Civil War. The unit's namesake was for its Captain, Robert R. Stewart of Terre Haute who would later command both the 2nd Indiana Cavalry Regiment and the 11th Indiana Cavalry Regiment.

The company served in the Department of West Virginia as an armed escort for Union General William Rosecrans from July to November 1861. The company served at the Headquarters of the Department of Western Virginia in March, 1862; and the Department of the Mountains until June, 1862. The company was attached to the Headquarters of the I Corps of the Army of Virginia in September, 1862. The company was later attached to the Headquarters of the XI Corps of the Army of the Potomac, to September, 1863, and at Headquarters Army of the Potomac to May, 1865. The company participated in all the services of these headquarters. Old members of the company mustered out on July 3, 1864. Veterans and Recruits mustered out May 31, 1865.

Original Organization of Company Officers and Non-Commissioned Officers
Name	Rank	Residence	Remarks
Robert R. Stewart	Captain	Terre Haute	Promoted to Major, 2nd Indiana Cavalry Regiment, October 22, 1861.
Levi Kirtley	First Lieutenant	Terre Haute	Promoted to Captain.
John W. Smith	Second Lieutenant	Terre Haute	Promoted to First Lieutenant.
Hiram L. Miller	First Sergeant	Vigo County	Promoted to First Lieutenant.
Marshall A. Warren	Quartermaster Sergeant	Vigo County	
Thomas Stewart	Sergeant	Vigo County	
Abram Sharra	Sergeant	Vigo County	Promoted to Second Lieutenant.
Henry S. Bartholomew	Sergeant	Vigo County	
Thomas Long	Sergeant	Vigo County	
Edward Hebb	Corporal	Vigo County	
Orlando C. Shaw	Corporal	Vigo County	Killed by guerillas September 30, 1861.
Alfred Larry	Corporal	Vigo County	
Thomas Harter	Corporal	Vigo County	Discharged October 9, 1862 by order of the United States Department of War.
Malcom McFadden	Corporal	Vigo County	Discharged August 25, 1861 for disability.
Charles Henderson	Corporal	Vigo County	
Joseph Rowland	Corporal	Vigo County	
Rufus C. Hovey	Corporal	Vigo County	

== Casualties ==
The company lost a total of 6 soldiers during its service: 3 Enlisted men were killed in action or mortally wounded and 3 Enlisted men were taken as Prisoner of war, 1 of which was presumed dead.

== Commanders ==
- Robert R. Stewart: July 4, 1861 - October 22, 1861 (promoted to Major of the 2nd Indiana Cavalry Regiment).
- Levi Kirtley: October 29, 1861 - February 25, 1862 (dismissed from command).
- Abraham Sharra: March 20, 1862 - March 20, 1862 (promoted to Major of the 11th Indiana Cavalry Regiment).
- Harmon S. Miller: May 1, 1864 - May 31, 1865 (mustered out with company).
