= Independent Company Mounted Scouts =

- Active: August 13, 1863 – April 23, 1864
- Disbanded: April 23, 1864
- Country: United States
- Allegiance: Union
- Branch: Infantry
- Size: Company
- Garrison/HQ: Leavenworth, Indiana
- Engagements: American Civil War

The Independent Company Mounted Scouts served in the Union Army during the American Civil War. The "Independent Company" was made up of infantrymen from Indiana and was organized at Leavenworth, Indiana on August 13, 1863. They were mustered out on April 23, 1864.

== See also ==
- List of Indiana Civil War regiments
