= 107th Indiana Infantry Regiment =

- Active: July 10, 1863–July 18, 1863
- Disbanded: July 18, 1863
- Country: United States
- Allegiance: Union
- Branch: Infantry
- Size: Regiment
- Engagements: American Civil War

Commanders
- Colonel: DeWitt C. Rugg

The 107th Indiana Infantry Regiment was organized in Indianapolis, Indiana, as one of thirteen "Minute Men" regiments and a battalion formed for emergency service during Morgan's Raid into Indiana during the American Civil War. On July 8, 1863, after Confederate General John Hunt Morgan crossed the Ohio River into southern Indiana, governor Oliver P. Morton called for volunteers to defend the state. Within forty-eight hours, 65,000 men, including those who joined the 107th, had volunteered their services. The 107th Indiana mustered into service on July 10, 1863, under the command of Colonel DeWitt C. Rugg, and included a regiment of twelve companies and a battalion of eight companies. Its men, all from Indianapolis, were members of the Indiana Legion, the state's militia. The 107th was not called into the field and its men were mustered out of service on July 18, 1863. The threat ended on July 14, when it was confirmed that Morgan had entered Ohio. Morgan was captured in eastern Ohio on July 26, 1863.

== See also ==
- List of Indiana Civil War regiments
- Indiana in the American Civil War
- Indianapolis in the American Civil War
