= 71st Indiana Infantry Regiment =

71st Regiment Indiana Infantry
- Active: July 21, 1862 – February 22, 1863
- Country: United States
- Allegiance: Union
- Branch: Infantry
- Engagements: Battle of Richmond

The 71st Regiment Indiana Infantry was an infantry regiment that served in the Union Army during the American Civil War.

== Service ==
The 71st Indiana Infantry was organized at Terre Haute, Indiana, beginning July 21, 1862, and mustered in for three years service August 18, 1862, at Indianapolis under the command of Lieutenant Colonel Melville D. Topping.

The regiment left Indiana for Lexington, Kentucky and was assigned to the 1st Brigade, Army of Kentucky.

The 71st Indiana Infantry ceased to exist on February 22, 1863, when its designation was changed to the 6th Indiana Cavalry.

== Detailed service ==
Nearly every man of the regiment was captured at the Battle of Richmond, August 30, 1862. Paroled, they returned to Indianapolis to await being exchanged. The regiment was reorganized through December 1862 and again sent into Kentucky. The regiment was captured in action at Muldraugh Hill, Kentucky, on December 29, 1862, paroled, and returned to Indiana to once again await being exchanged. It was during this time that the regiment was changed from infantry to cavalry; it remained on duty in Indianapolis until August 26, 1863.

== Commanders ==
- Lieutenant Colonel Melville D. Topping - commanded at the Battle of Richmond; killed in action

== See also ==
- 6th Regiment Indiana Cavalry
- List of Indiana Civil War regiments
- Indiana in the Civil War
