= 103rd Indiana Infantry Regiment =

- Active: July 10–16, 1863
- Disbanded: July 16, 1863
- Country: United States
- Allegiance: Union
- Branch: Infantry
- Size: Regiment
- Engagements: American Civil War: Morgan's Raid

The 103rd Indiana Infantry Regiment served in the Union Army between July 10 and 16, 1863, during the American Civil War.

== Service ==
The regiment was organized in Indianapolis, Indiana on July 10, 1863, to repel Morgan's Raid. On July 11, it was ordered to Vernon, Indiana in pursuit of General John Hunt Morgan and his troops driving them from Vernon to Harrison and Batavia, Ohio between July 12–15. On July 15, the regiment marched to Sauman's Station and back to Indianapolis, Indiana, where they were mustered out on July 16, 1863.

== See also ==
- List of Indiana Civil War regiments

== Bibliography ==
- Dyer, Frederick H. (1959). A Compendium of the War of the Rebellion. New York and London. Thomas Yoseloff, Publisher. LCCN 59-12963.
