= 61st Indiana Infantry Regiment =

- Active: 1862
- Country: United States
- Allegiance: Union
- Branch: Infantry
- Size: Regiment
- Engagements: American Civil War

The 61st Indiana Infantry Regiment was an infantry regiment from Indiana that failed to complete its organization to serve in the Union Army during the American Civil War. The enlisted men were transferred to the 35th Indiana Infantry Regiment on May 22, 1862.

== See also ==
- List of Indiana Civil War regiments

== Bibliography ==
- Dyer, Frederick H. (1959). A Compendium of the War of the Rebellion. New York and London. Thomas Yoseloff, Publisher. LCCN 59-12963.
