= 102nd Indiana Infantry Regiment =

- Active: July 10–17, 1863
- Disbanded: July 17, 1863
- Country: United States
- Allegiance: Union
- Branch: Infantry
- Size: Regiment
- Engagements: American Civil War: Morgan's Raid

The 102nd Indiana Infantry Regiment served in the Union Army between July 10 and 17, 1863, during the American Civil War.

== Service ==
The regiment was organized in Indianapolis, Indiana on July 10, 1863, to repel Morgan's Raid. Morgan's Raid so-called after Confederate General John Hunt Morgan who, with his troops, rained terror and destruction throughout Indiana. The regiment saw duty at Vernon, Dupont, Osgood and Sauman's Station, and on July 17, 1863, the regiment was mustered out.

== See also ==
- List of Indiana Civil War regiments

== Bibliography ==
- Dyer, Frederick H. (1959). A Compendium of the War of the Rebellion. New York and London. Thomas Yoseloff, Publisher. LCCN 59-12963.
