= 17th Independent Battery Indiana Light Artillery =

- Active: May 20, 1862 – July 8, 1865
- Disbanded: 1865
- Allegiance: Union
- Branch: Artillery
- Engagements: American Civil War: Battle of Berryville; Shenandoah Valley Campaign; Battle of Opequon; Battle of Fisher's Hill; Battle of Cedar Creek

Commanders
- Notable commanders: Captain Milton L. Milner

17th Indiana Battery Light Artillery was an artillery battery that served in the Union Army during the American Civil War.

== Service ==
The battery was organized in Indianapolis, Indiana, and mustered in May 20, 1862, for three years service.

The battery was attached to Defenses of Baltimore, Maryland, VIII Corps, Middle Department, to January 1863. Defenses, Upper Potomac, VIII Corps, to March 1863. 1st Brigade, 1st Division, VIII Corps, to June 1863. Maryland Brigade, French's Command, VIII Corps, to July 1863. 2nd Brigade, Maryland Heights Division, Department of West Virginia, July 1863. 1st Brigade, Maryland Heights Division, Department of West Virginia, to December 1863. 1st Brigade, 1st Division, Department of West Virginia, to January 1864. Wheaton's Brigade, 1st Division, Department of West Virginia, to April 1864. Reserve Division, Harpers Ferry, West Virginia, to August 1864. Reserve Artillery, XIX Corps, Army of the Shenandoah, Middle Military Division, to October 1864. Garrison Artillery, Frederick City, Maryland, and Winchester, Virginia, to December 1864. Artillery Brigade, XIX Corps, Army of the Shenandoah, to March 1865. Artillery Reserve, Army of the Shenandoah, to July 1865.

The 17th Indiana Battery Light Artillery mustered out July 8, 1865, in Indianapolis.

== Detailed service ==
Left Indiana for Baltimore, Maryland, July 5, 1862. Garrison duty at Baltimore, July 7 to December 27, 1862. Moved to Harpers Ferry, Virginia, December 27, and garrison duty there until July 1863. Evacuation of Harpers Ferry July 1, 1863. Reoccupation of Harpers Ferry and Maryland Heights July 7, 1863, and garrison duty there until July 1864. Action at Berryville, Virginia, October 18, 1863. Well's Demonstration from Harpers Ferry December 10–24, 1863. Sheridan's Shenandoah Valley Campaign August 7-November 28, 1864. Battle of Opequon, Winchester, September 19. Strasburg September 21. Fisher's Hill September 22. Battle of Cedar Creek October 19. Garrison duty at Frederick City, Maryland, and at Winchester, Virginia, until June 19, 1865, when the battery was ordered to Indianapolis.

== Casualties ==
The battery lost a total of 16 men during service; 4 enlisted men killed or mortally wounded, 2 officers and 10 enlisted men due to disease.

== Commanders ==
- Captain Milton L. Milner

== See also ==
- List of Indiana Civil War regiments
- Indiana in the Civil War
