= 19th Independent Battery Indiana Light Artillery =

- Active: August 5, 1862 – June 10, 1865
- Country: United States
- Allegiance: (United States) Union; Indiana
- Branch: Union Army
- Type: Field Artillery
- Size: Artillery Battery
- Equipment: 4 × 12-pounder Napoleons and 2 × 3-inch Ordnance rifles (Oct '62)
- Engagements: Battle of Perryville; Tullahoma Campaign; Battle of Chickamauga; Siege of Chattanooga; Battle of Missionary Ridge; Atlanta campaign Battle of Resaca; Battle of Kennesaw Mountain; Battle of Peachtree Creek; Siege of Atlanta; Battle of Jonesboro; March to the Sea; Carolinas campaign Battle of Bentonville

Commanders
- Notable commanders: Samuel J. Harris

19th Indiana Battery Light Artillery was an artillery battery that served in the Union Army during the American Civil War. It was often referred to as Harris' Battery.

== Service ==
The battery was organized at Indianapolis, Indiana, and mustered on August 5, 1862, for a three-year enlistment under the command of Captain Samuel J. Harris.

The battery was attached to 34th Brigade, 10th Division, Army of the Ohio, September 1862. 34th Brigade, 10th Division, I Corps, Army of the Ohio, to November 1862. Artillery, 5th Division, Center, XIV Corps, Army of the Cumberland, to January 1863. Artillery, 5th Division, XIV Corps, Army of the Cumberland, to June 1863. Artillery, 4th Division, XIV Corps, to October 1863. Artillery, 3rd Division, XIV Corps, to July 1864. Artillery Brigade, XIV Corps, to June 1865.

The 19th Indiana Battery Light Artillery mustered out of service on June 10, 1865.

== Detailed service ==
Ordered to Louisville, Kentucky. Pursuit of Bragg into Kentucky October 1–15, 1862. Battle of Perryville, October 8. March to Lebanon and Woodsonville October 16–28, and duty there until December. Operations against Morgan, in Kentucky, December 22, 1862 – January 2, 1863. March to Nashville, Tennessee, then to Murfreesboro, Tennessee, January 1863, and duty there until June. Expedition to Auburn, Liberty, and Alexandria February 3–5. Expedition to Woodbury March 3–8. Action at Vaught's Hill, near Woodbury, March 20. Expedition to Lebanon, Carthage, and Liberty April 1–8. Expedition to McMinnville April 20–30. Tullahoma Campaign June 23-July 7. Hoover's Gap June 24–26. Occupation of middle Tennessee until August 16. Passage of the Cumberland Mountains and Tennessee River and Chickamauga Campaign August 16-September 22. Shellmound August 21. Narrows, near Shellmound, August 28. Reconnaissance toward Chattanooga August 30–31. Battle of Chickamauga, September 19–21. Siege of Chattanooga September 24-November 23. Chattanooga-Ringgold Campaign November 23–27. Battles of Orchard Knob November 23–24. Missionary Ridge November 25. Demonstrations on Dalton, Georgia, February 22–27, 1864. Tunnel Hill, Buzzard's Roost Gap and Rocky Faced Ridge February 23–25. Atlanta Campaign May 1 to September 8. Demonstrations on Rocky Faced Ridge May 8–11. Battle of Resaca May 14–15. Advance on Dallas May 18–25. Operations on Pumpkin Vine Creek and battles about Dallas, New Hope Church, and Allatoona Hills May 25-June 5. Ackworth June 2. Operations about Marietta and against Kennesaw Mountain June 10-July 2. Pine Hill June 11–14. Lost Mountain June 15–17. Assault on Kennesaw June 27. Ruff's Station July 4. Chattahoochie River July 5–17. Peachtree Creek July 19–20. Siege of Atlanta July 22-August 25. Utoy Creek August 5–7. Flank movement on Jonesboro August 25–30. Battle of Jonesboro August 31-September 1. Operations against Hood in northern Georgia and northern Alabama September 29-November 3. March to the Sea November 15-December 10. Siege of Savannah December 10–21. Campaign of the Carolinas January to April. Fayetteville, North Carolina, March 11. Taylor's Hole Creek, Averysboro, March 16. Battle of Bentonville March 19–21. Occupation of Goldsboro March 24. Advance on Raleigh April 10–14. Occupation of Raleigh April 14. Bennett's House April 26. Surrender of Johnston and his army. March to Washington, D.C., via Richmond, Virginia, April 29-May 19. Grand Review of the Armies May 24.

== Casualties ==
The battery lost a total of 32 men during service; 1 officer and 10 enlisted men killed or mortally wounded, 21 enlisted men died of disease.

At the Battle of Perryville, the 19th Battery went into battle with 142 officers and enlisted men. The battery suffered losses of three killed, 12 wounded, and three missing.

== Armament ==
At Perryville, the 19th Battery was armed with four 12-pounder Napoleons and two 3-inch Ordnance rifles. In December 1862, the battery reported having the following 3-inch rifle ammunition: 86 Hotchkiss fuze shell, 96 Hotchkiss canister shot, 28 Schenkl canister shot. The unit reported having 15 Army revolvers and 16 cavalry sabers.

== Commanders ==
- Captain Samuel J. Harris
- Lieutenant Robert S. Lackey – commanded at the battle of Chickamauga

== See also ==
- List of Indiana Civil War regiments
- Indiana in the Civil War

== Notes ==
Attribution
