= 15th Independent Battery Indiana Light Artillery =

- Active: March 11, 1862 – June 30, 1865
- Country: United States
- Allegiance: Union
- Branch: Artillery
- Engagements: Battle of Harpers Ferry; Knoxville Campaign; Atlanta campaign Battle of Resaca; Battle of Dallas; Battle of New Hope Church; Battle of Allatoona; Battle of Kennesaw Mountain; Siege of Atlanta; Battle of Jonesboro; Battle of Lovejoy's Station; Franklin-Nashville Campaign; Battle of Franklin; Battle of Nashville; Carolinas campaign

15th Indiana Battery Light Artillery was an artillery battery that served in the Union Army during the American Civil War.

== Service ==
The battery was organized in Indianapolis, Indiana March 11, 1862 and mustered on July 5, 1862, for three years service under the command of Captain John C. H. Von Sehlen.

The battery was attached to D'Utassy's Brigade, White's Division, Army of Virginia, to September 1862. Miles' Command, Harpers Ferry, September 1862. Camp Douglas, Illinois, and Indianapolis, Indiana, to April 1863. District of Central Kentucky, Department of the Ohio, to June 1863. 2nd Brigade, 4th Division, XXIII Corps, Army of the Ohio, to July 1863. 2nd Brigade, 1st Division, XXIII Corps, to August 1863. 1st Brigade, 4th Division, XXIII Corps, to October 1863. 2nd Brigade, 4th Division, XXIII Corps, to November 1863. 2nd Brigade, 1st Cavalry Division, Department of the Ohio, to December 1863. Artillery, 2nd Division, IX Corps, Department of the Ohio, to April 1864. Artillery, 3rd Division, XXIII Corps, to December 1864. Artillery, 2nd Division, XXIII Army Corps, Army of the Ohio, to February 1865, and Department of North Carolina to June 1865.

The 15th Indiana Battery Light Artillery mustered out June 30, 1865, in Indianapolis.

== Detailed service ==
Left Indiana for Harpers Ferry, Virginia, July 5. Duty at Martinsburg and Harpers Ferry, until September 1862. Defense of Harpers Ferry September 13–15. Bolivar Heights September 14. Surrendered September 15. Paroled September 16 and sent to Annapolis, Maryland, then to Camp Douglas, Chicago, Illinois. Duty at Camp Douglas and Indianapolis until March 1863. Ordered to Louisville, Kentucky. Pursuit of Morgan in Kentucky April 1863. Action at Paris, Kentucky, April 16. Pursuit of Morgan through Indiana and Ohio July 1–26. New Lisbon, Ohio, July 26. Paris, Kentucky, July 29. Burnside's Campaign in eastern Tennessee August 16-October 17. Winter's Gap August 31. Actions at Athens, Calhoun, and Charleston September 25. Philadelphia September 27 and October 24. Knoxville Campaign November 4-December 23. Loudon November 14. Lenoir November 14–15. Campbell's Station November 16. Siege of Knoxville November 17-December 5. Kingston November 24. Bean's Station December 10. Blain's Cross Roads December 16–19. Duty at Knoxville until January 19, 1864. March to Red Clay, Georgia. Atlanta Campaign May 1-September 8. Demonstration on Rocky Faced Ridge May 8–11. Battle of Resaca May 14–15. Cartersville May 20. Operations on line of Pumpkin Vine Creek and battles about Dallas, New Hope Church, and Allatoona Hills May 25-June 5. Operations about Marietta and against Kennesaw Mountain June 10-July 2. Lost Mountain June 15–17. Muddy Creek June 17. Noyes Creek June 19. Cheyney's Farm June 22. Olley's Farm June 26–27. Assault on Kennesaw June 27. Nickajack Creek July 2–5. Chattahoochie River July 5–17. Siege of Atlanta July 22-August 25. Utoy Creek August 5–7. Flank movement on Jonesboro August 25–30. Battle of Jonesboro August 31-September 1. Lovejoy's Station September 2–6. Pursuit of Hood into Alabama October 1–26. Nashville Campaign November–December. Columbia, Duck River, November 24–27. Columbia Ford November 28–29. Battle of Franklin November 30. Battle of Nashville December 15–16. Pursuit of Hood, to the Tennessee River, December 17–28. At Clifton, Tennessee, until January 16, 1865. Movement to Washington, D.C., then to Fort Fisher, North Carolina, January 16-February 9. Operations against Hoke February 11–14. Fort Anderson February 18–19. Town Creek February 19–20. Capture of Wilmington February 22. Campaign of the Carolinas March 1-April 26. Advance on Goldsboro March 6–21. Occupation of Goldsboro March 21. Advance on Raleigh April 10–14. Occupation of Raleigh April 14. Bennett's House April 26. Surrender of Johnston and his army. Duty at Greensboro, North Carolina, until June. Ordered to Indianapolis.

== Casualties ==
The battery lost a total of 14 men during service; 1 enlisted men killed, 1 officer and 12 enlisted men died of disease.

== Commanders ==
- Captain John C. H. Von Sehlen - commissioned March 7, 1862
- Captain Alonzo D. Harvey - commissioned, May 10, 1864

== See also ==
- List of Indiana Civil War regiments
- Indiana in the Civil War
