= 148th Indiana Infantry Regiment =

- Active: February 25 – September 5, 1865
- Disbanded: September 5, 1865
- Country: United States
- Allegiance: Union
- Branch: Infantry
- Size: Regiment (Note: According to W.H.H. Terrell (1867), The Report of the Adjutant General of the State of Indiana. Containing Rosters for the Years 1861–1865, Volume 7, the 148th Indiana Infantry Regiment was composed of ten companies. Companies "A" to "I" and "K".)
- Garrison/HQ: Middle Tennessee
- Engagements: American Civil War

Insignia
- Colonel: Nicholas R. Ruckle
- Lt. Colonel: William J. Manker
- Major: Henry A. White

The 148th Indiana Infantry Regiment was an infantry regiment from Indiana that served in the Union Army between February 25 and September 5, 1865, during the American Civil War.

== Service ==
Recruited from the 6th district, the regiment was organized at Indianapolis, Indiana, with a strength of 1,027 men and mustered in on February 25, 1865. It left Indiana for Nashville, Tennessee, on February 28. The regiment performed guard and garrison duty in the District of Middle Tennessee, Department of the Cumberland, to early September. The regiment was mustered out on September 5, 1865. During its service the regiment incurred thirty-six fatalities, and another seventy-five deserted.

== See also ==
- List of Indiana Civil War regiments

== Bibliography ==
- Dyer, Frederick H. (1959). A Compendium of the War of the Rebellion. New York and London. Thomas Yoseloff, Publisher. LCCN 59-12963.
- Holloway, William R. (2004). Civil War Regiments From Indiana. eBookOnDisk.com Pensacola, Florida. ISBN 1-9321-5731-X.
- Terrell, W.H.H. (1867). The Report of the Adjutant General of the State of Indiana. Containing Rosters for the Years 1861–1865, Volume 7. Indianapolis, Indiana. Samuel M. Douglass, State Printer.
