= 12th Independent Battery Indiana Light Artillery =

- Active: January 25, 1862 – July 7, 1865
- Country: United States
- Allegiance: Union
- Branch: Artillery
- Engagements: Siege of Corinth; Siege of Chattanooga; Battle of Lookout Mountain; Battle of Missionary Ridge; Battle of Nashville

12th Indiana Battery Light Artillery was an artillery battery that served in the Union Army during the American Civil War.

== Service ==
The battery was organized at Jeffersonville and Indianapolis, Indiana, and mustered in for a three-year enlistment on January 25, 1862.

The battery served unattached, Army of the Ohio, to June 1862. Reserve Artillery, Army of the Ohio, to September 1862. Post and Defenses of Nashville, Tennessee, Department of the Ohio, to November 1862, and Department of the Cumberland to July 1865.

The 12th Indiana Battery Light Artillery mustered out of service on July 7, 1865.

== Detailed service ==
- Left Indiana for Louisville, Kentucky, January 25, 1862.
- Moved to Nashville, Tennessee, February 14 - March 6, 1862.
- Marched to Savannah, Tennessee, March 20 - April 7, 1862.
- Advanced on and besieged Corinth, Mississippi, April 29 - May 30, 1862.
- Buell's Campaign in northern Alabama and mid Tennessee, June - August, 1862.
- Assigned to duty as garrison at Fort Negley, Defenses of Nashville, Tennessee, August 18, 1862 - July 1865.
- Siege of Nashville, Tennessee, September 12 - November 6, 1862.
- Repulse of attack on Nashville by Breckenridge, Forrest, and Morgan, November 5, 1862.
- One half of the battery was ordered to Chattanooga in November 1863 and participated in the battles of Chattanooga, November 23–25, 1863.
- Battle of Nashville, December 15–16, 1864.
- Non-veterans mustered out December 23, 1864.

== Casualties ==
The battery lost a total of 24 men during service; 2 officers and 22 enlisted men died of disease.

== Commanders ==
- Lieutenant James A. Dunwoody

== See also ==
- List of Indiana Civil War regiments
- Indiana in the Civil War
