= 123rd Indiana Infantry Regiment =

Union Army infantry regiment in the American Civil War

123rd Regiment Indiana Infantry
- Active: December 1863 – August 25, 1865
- Country: United States
- Allegiance: Union
- Branch: Infantry
- Engagements: Atlanta campaign Battle of Resaca; Battle of Kennesaw Mountain; Siege of Atlanta; Battle of Lovejoy's Station; Battle of Franklin; Battle of Nashville; Carolinas campaign Battle of Wyse Fork

The 123rd Regiment Indiana Infantry was an infantry regiment that served in the Union Army during the American Civil War.

== Service ==
The 123rd Indiana Infantry was organized at Greensburg, Terre Haute, and Indianapolis, Indiana beginning December 25, 1863 and mustered in under the command of Colonel John Craven McQuiston.

The regiment was attached to 2nd Brigade, 1st Division, XXIII Corps, Army of the Ohio, to June 1864. 4th Brigade, 3rd Division, XXIII Corps, to August 1864. 3rd Brigade, 2nd Division, XXIII Corps, to December 1864. 2nd Brigade, 1st Division, XXIII Corps, Army of the Ohio, to February 1865, and Department of North Carolina to August 1865.

The 123rd Indiana Infantry mustered out of service August 25, 1865.

== Detailed service ==
Left Indiana for Nashville, Tennessee, March 18, 1864. Marched to Charleston, Tennessee, April 7–24, 1864. Atlanta Campaign May 1 to September 8. Demonstrations on Dalton, Georgia, May 8–13. Rocky Faced Ridge May 8–11. Battle of Resaca May 14–15. Movements on Dallas May 18–25. Operations on Pumpkin Vine Creek and battles about Dallas, New Hope Church, and Allatoona Hills May 25-June 5. Operations about Marietta and against Kennesaw Mountain June 10-July 2. Lost Mountain June 15–17. Muddy Creek June 17. Noyes Creek June 19. Assault on Kennesaw June 27. Nickajack Creek July 2–5. Ruff's Mills July 3–4. Chattahoochie River July 5–17. Siege of Atlanta July 22-August 25. Utoy Creek August 5–7. Flank movement on Jonesboro August 25–30. Lovejoy's Station September 2–6. Operations against Hood in northern Georgia and northern Alabama September 29-November 3. Nashville Campaign November–December. In front of Columbia November 24–27. Battle of Franklin November 30. Battle of Nashville December 15–16. Pursuit of Hood to the Tennessee River December 17–28. At Clifton, Tennessee, until January 15, 1865. Movement to Washington, D.C.; then to Morehead City, North Carolina, January 15-February 24. Carolinas Campaign March 1-April 26. Advance on Kinston and Goldsboro March 1–21. Battle of Wyse Forks March 6–8. Kinston March 14. Occupation of Goldsboro March 21. Advance on Raleigh April 10–14. Occupation of Raleigh April 14. Bennett's House April 26. Surrender of Johnston and his army. Duty at Charlotte and Raleigh, North Carolina, until August.

== Casualties ==
The regiment lost a total of 183 men during service; 4 officers and 47 enlisted men killed or mortally wounded, 1 officer and 131 enlisted men died of disease.

== Commanders ==
- Colonel John Craven McQuiston

== See also ==
- List of Indiana Civil War regiments
- Indiana in the Civil War
