= 122nd Indiana Infantry Regiment =

- Active: 1864
- Country: United States
- Allegiance: Union
- Branch: Infantry
- Size: Regiment
- Engagements: American Civil War

The 122nd Indiana Infantry Regiment was an infantry regiment from Indiana that failed to complete its organization to serve in the Union Army during the American Civil War. The enlisted men in the regiment were transferred to the 120th Indiana Infantry Regiment.

== See also ==
- List of Indiana Civil War regiments

== Bibliography ==
- Dyer, Frederick H. (1959). A Compendium of the War of the Rebellion. New York and London. Thomas Yoseloff, Publisher. LCCN 59-12963.
