= 20th Independent Battery Indiana Light Artillery =

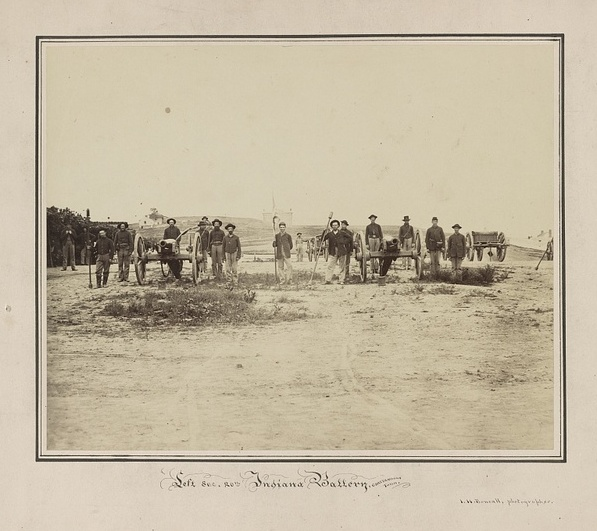
- 20th Indiana Battery near Chattanooga, 1864-1865
- Active: September 19, 1862 – June 28, 1865
- Country: United States
- Allegiance: Union
- Branch: Artillery
- Engagements: Siege of Atlanta; Battle of Jonesboro; Battle of Nashville

20th Indiana Battery Light Artillery was an artillery battery that served in the Union Army during the American Civil War.

== Service ==
The battery was organized at Indianapolis, Indiana and mustered in September 19, 1862, for a three-year enlistment.

The battery was attached to District of Western Kentucky, Department of the Ohio, to May 1863. Post and District of Nashville, Tennessee, Department of the Cumberland, to January 1864. Artillery, 1st Division, XI Corps, Army of the Cumberland, to April 1864. Unattached, 4th Division, XX Corps, Department of the Cumberland, to July 1864. Artillery Brigade, XIV Corps, Army of the Cumberland, to November 1864. Artillery, Provisional Division, District of the Etowah, Department of the Cumberland, to January 1865. Garrison Artillery, Chattanooga, Tennessee, Department of the Cumberland, to June 1865.

The 20th Indiana Battery Light Artillery mustered out of service on June 28, 1865.

== Detailed service ==
Left Indiana for Henderson, Kentucky, December 17, 1862. Duty at Henderson, and in the District of Western Kentucky until May 1863. Ordered to Nashville, Tennessee, and duty there until October 5, 1863. Refitted and assigned to guard duty along Nashville & Chattanooga Railroad until March 5, 1864. Moved to Bridgeport, Alabama, March 5, and garrison duty there until July. Ordered to the field and joined XIV Corps, Army of the Cumberland, south of the Chattahoochie River, Georgia. Siege of Atlanta July 22-August 25. Flank movement on Jonesboro August 25–30. Battle of Jonesboro August 31-September 1. Pursuit of Hood into Alabama October 1–26. Action near Atlanta October 30. Moved to Chattanooga, Tennessee, November 5, then to Nashville, Tennessee. Battles of Nashville December 15–16. Duty at Courtland, Alabama, and Chattanooga, Tennessee, until June 1865.

== Casualties ==
The battery lost a total of 31 men during service; 7 enlisted men killed or mortally wounded, 24 enlisted men died of disease.

== Commanders ==
- Captain Milton A. Osborne

== See also ==
- List of Indiana Civil War regiments
- Indiana in the Civil War
