= 13th Independent Battery Indiana Light Artillery =

- Active: 22 February 1862 – 10 July 1865
- Branch: Union Army
- Type: Field Artillery
- Size: Battery
- Equipment: 1 12-pounder Napoleon, 1 3-inch Ordnance rifle, 1 M1841 12-pounder howitzer, 1 M1841 12-pounder field gun (Oct 1862)
- Engagements: Battle of Munfordville (1862)

Commanders
- Notable commanders: Benjamin S. Nicklin

13th Indiana Battery Light Artillery was an artillery battery that served in the Union Army during the American Civil War. The unit served at the Battle of Munfordville on 14–17 October 1862. The battery spent the remainder of the war on garrison duty before being mustered out in July 1865.

== Service ==
The battery was organized at Indianapolis, Indiana, and mustered in for a three-year enlistment on February 22, 1862.

The battery served unassigned in Kentucky, Army of the Ohio, to September 1862. Artillery, 12th Division, Army of the Ohio, to November 1862. Ward's Brigade, Post of Gallatin, Tennessee, Department of the Cumberland, to June 1863. Garrison Artillery, Gallatin, Tennessee, Department of the Cumberland, to January 1865. Garrison Artillery, Chattanooga, Tennessee, Department of the Cumberland, to July 1865.

The 13th Indiana Battery Light Artillery mustered out of service on July 10, 1865.

== Detailed service ==
Left Indiana for Louisville, Kentucky, February 23, 1862. Served as cavalry in Kentucky from February 1862 to January 1863. Skirmish at Monterey, Owen County, Kentucky, June 11. Operations against Morgan July 4–28. Paris, Kentucky, July 19. Siege of Munfordville September 14–17. Frankfort October 9. Hartsville, Tennessee, December 7. Garrison Fort Thomas, Gallatin, Tennessee, January 1863 to January 1865, and garrison duty at Chattanooga, Tennessee, until July 1865.

== Casualties ==
The battery lost a total of 26 men during service; 7 enlisted men killed or mortally wounded, 19 enlisted men died of disease.

== Armament ==
At the Battle of Munfordville, the 13th Indiana Battery led by Lieutenant Mason was armed with one 12-pounder Napoleon, one 3-inch Ordnance rifle, one M1841 12-pounder howitzer, and one M1841 12-pounder (heavy) field gun. The latter weapon was rarely seen on Civil War battlefields. Its 1,800 lb (816 kg) weight meant that eight horses were required to pull the gun, whereas other field artillery pieces only needed six horses. Because of their great weight, most heavy 12-pounders spent the war in fixed fortifications.

== Commanders ==
- Captain Benjamin S. Nicklin

== See also ==
- List of Indiana Civil War regiments
- Indiana in the Civil War
