= 156th Indiana Infantry Regiment =

156th Indiana Infantry Battalion
- Active: April 12 – August 4, 1865
- Disbanded: August 4, 1865
- Country: United States
- Allegiance: Union
- Branch: Infantry
- Size: Battalion (Note: According to W.H.H. Terrell (1866), The Report of the Adjutant General of the State of Indiana. Containing Rosters for the Years 1861–1865, Volume 3, the 156th Indiana Infantry Battalion was composed of five companies. Companies "A" to "E".)
- Garrison/HQ: Shenandoah Valley Area
- Engagements: American Civil War

Commanders
- Lt. Colonel: Charles M. Smith
- Adjutant: Charles O. Wilson

The 156th Indiana Infantry Battalion was an infantry battalion from Indiana that served in the Union Army between April 12 and August 4, 1865, during the American Civil War.

== Service ==
The battalion was organized at Indianapolis, Indiana, with a strength of 531 men and mustered in on April 12, 1865. The battalion consisted of five companies, two companies from the 4th and 5th district and another three from the 6th district. It left Indiana for Harper's Ferry, West Virginia on April 27. It was then placed on guard duty at various points in the Shenandoah Valley until early August, and was mustered out on August 4, 1865. During its service the battalion incurred seventeen fatalities and another fifty-four men deserted.

== See also ==
- List of Indiana Civil War regiments

== Bibliography ==
- Dyer, Frederick H. (1959). A Compendium of the War of the Rebellion. New York and London. Thomas Yoseloff, Publisher. LCCN 59-12963.
- Holloway, William R. (2004). Civil War Regiments From Indiana. eBookOnDisk.com Pensacola, Florida. ISBN 1-9321-5731-X.
- Terrell, W.H.H. (1866). The Report of the Adjutant General of the State of Indiana. Containing Rosters for the Years 1861–1865, Volume 3. Indianapolis, Indiana. Samuel M. Douglass, State Printer.
