= 147th Indiana Infantry Regiment =

- Active: March 13 – August 4, 1865
- Disbanded: August 4, 1865
- Country: United States
- Allegiance: Union
- Branch: Infantry
- Size: Regiment (Note: According to W.H.H. Terrell (1867), The Report of the Adjutant General of the State of Indiana. Containing Rosters for the Years 1861–1865, Volume 7, the 147th Indiana Infantry Regiment was composed of ten companies. Companies "A" to "I" and "K".)
- Engagements: American Civil War

Commanders
- Colonel: Milton Peden
- Lt. Colonel: Theodore F. Colgrove
- Major: Joel J. Finney

The 147th Indiana Infantry Regiment was an infantry regiment from Indiana that served in the Union Army between March 13 and August 4, 1865, during the American Civil War.

== Service ==
The regiment consisted of seven companies recruited from the 5th district, two companies from the 11th, and one composed of detachments from Benton, Henry, and Fayette counties. The regiment was organized at Indianapolis, Indiana, with a strength of 1,078 men and mustered in on March 13, 1865. It left Indiana for Harper's Ferry, West Virginia on March 16. It was attached to the 1st Brigade of the 3rd Provisional Division, Army of the Shenandoah, and guard duty at Charleston, Stevenson's Station, Summit Point, Berryville, Harpers Ferry, West Virginia and Maryland Heights, Missouri till early August. During its service the regiment incurred forty-four fatalities, and another sixty-three deserted, unaccounted for one man.

== See also ==
- List of Indiana Civil War regiments

== Bibliography ==
- Dyer, Frederick H. (1959). A Compendium of the War of the Rebellion. New York and London. Thomas Yoseloff, Publisher. LCCN 59-12963.
- Holloway, William R. (2004). Civil War Regiments From Indiana. eBookOnDisk.com Pensacola, Florida. ISBN 1-9321-5731-X.
- Terrell, W.H.H. (1867). The Report of the Adjutant General of the State of Indiana. Containing Rosters for the Years 1861–1865, Volume 7. Indianapolis, Indiana. Samuel M. Douglass, State Printer.
