= 149th Indiana Infantry Regiment =

- Active: March 1 – September 27, 1865
- Disbanded: September 27, 1865
- Country: United States
- Allegiance: Union
- Branch: Infantry
- Size: Regiment (Note: According to W.H.H. Terrell (1867), The Report of the Adjutant General of the State of Indiana. Containing Rosters for the Years 1861–1865, Volume 7, the 149th Indiana Infantry Regiment was composed of ten companies. Companies "A" to "I" and "K".)
- Garrison/HQ: Decatur, Alabama
- Engagements: American Civil War

Commanders
- Colonel: William H. Fairbanks
- Lt. Colonel: William D. Mull
- Major: Thomas B. Reeder

The 149th Indiana Infantry Regiment was an infantry regiment from Indiana that served in the Union Army between March 1 and September 27, 1865, during the American Civil War.

== Service ==
The regiment was recruited from the 7th district, and was organized at Indianapolis, Indiana, with a strength of 1,041 men and mustered in on March 1, 1865. It left Indiana for Nashville, Tennessee on March 3. It was then ordered to Decatur, Alabama for guard and garrison duty until late September. Whilst at Decatur, the regiment received the surrender of Generals Roddey and Polk. The regiment was mustered out at Nashville, on September 27, 1865. During its service the regiment incurred thirty-eight fatalities, and another twenty-seven men deserted.

== See also ==
- List of Indiana Civil War regiments

== Bibliography ==
- Dyer, Frederick H. (1959). A Compendium of the War of the Rebellion. New York and London. Thomas Yoseloff, Publisher. LCCN 59-12963.
- Holloway, William R. (2004). Civil War Regiments From Indiana. eBookOnDisk.com Pensacola, Florida. ISBN 1-9321-5731-X.
- Terrell, W.H.H. (1867). The Report of the Adjutant General of the State of Indiana. Containing Rosters for the Years 1861–1865, Volume 7. Indianapolis, Indiana. Samuel M. Douglass, State Printer.
