= 142nd Indiana Infantry Regiment =

- Active: November 3, 1864 – July 14, 1865
- Disbanded: July 14, 1865
- Country: United States
- Allegiance: Union
- Branch: Infantry
- Size: Regiment (Note: According to W.H.H. Terrell (1867), The Report of the Adjutant General of the State of Indiana. Containing Rosters for the Years 1861–1865, Volume 7, the 142nd Indiana Infantry Regiment was composed of ten companies. Companies "A" to "I" and "K".)
- Garrison/HQ: Nashville, Tennessee
- Engagements: American Civil War: Battle of Nashville

Commanders
- Colonel: John M. Comparet
- Lt. Colonel: Chauncey B. Oakley
- Major: Sanford Thomas

The 142nd Indiana Infantry Regiment was an infantry regiment from Indiana that served in the Union Army between November 3, 1864, and July 14, 1865, during the American Civil War.

== Service ==
The regiment was recruited at Fort Wayne and organized at Indianapolis, Indiana, with a strength of 1,015 men and mustered in on November 3, 1864. It left Indiana for Nashville, Tennessee, on November 18 was assigned post duty there until July 1865. The regiment was attached to the 2nd Brigade, 4th Division, 20th Corps and was left behind when the Corps marched into Georgia with Major General Sherman's Army.

With the 2nd Brigade, the regiment was in reserve at the Battle of Nashville on December 15–16, 1864. It occupied the left of the inner line of defense from the Cumberland River to Fort Negley. After the battle, the regiment remained at Nashville until it was mustered out on July 14, 1865. During its service the regiment incurred sixty-four fatalities, another twenty-eight deserted and twenty-two men unaccounted for.

== See also ==
- List of Indiana Civil War regiments

== Bibliography ==
- Dyer, Frederick H. (1959). A Compendium of the War of the Rebellion. New York and London. Thomas Yoseloff, Publisher. LCCN 59-12963.
- Holloway, William R. (2004). Civil War Regiments From Indiana. eBookOnDisk.com Pensacola, Florida. ISBN 1-9321-5731-X.
- Terrell, W.H.H. (1867). The Report of the Adjutant General of the State of Indiana. Containing Rosters for the Years 1861–1865, Volume 7. Indianapolis, Indiana. Samuel M. Douglass, State Printer.
