= 151st Indiana Infantry Regiment =

- Active: March 3 – September 19, 1865
- Disbanded: September 19, 1865
- Country: United States
- Allegiance: Union
- Branch: Infantry
- Size: Regiment (Note: According to W.H.H. Terrell (1867), The Report of the Adjutant General of the State of Indiana. Containing Rosters for the Years 1861–1865, Volume 7, the 151st Indiana Infantry Regiment was composed of ten companies. Companies "A" to "I" and "K".)
- Garrison/HQ: Nashville, Tennessee
- Engagements: American Civil War

Commanders
- Colonel: Joshua Healy
- Lt. Colonel: John E. Sweet
- Major: Michael Eagan

The 151st Indiana Infantry Regiment was an infantry regiment from Indiana that served in the Union Army between March 3 and September 19, 1865, during the American Civil War.

== Service ==
The regiment was recruited from the 9th district and organized at Indianapolis, Indiana, with a strength of 1,013 men. It was mustered in on March 9, 1865, and left Indiana for Nashville, Tennessee, on March 13, where it reported to General Lovell Rousseau. On March 14, the regiment was ordered to Tullahoma, where it saw duty until June 14. The regiment was ordered to Nashville, and remained on garrison duty until early September. The regiment was mustered out on September 19, 1865. During its service the regiment incurred sixty fatalities, and another thirty-three men deserted.

== See also ==
- List of Indiana Civil War regiments

== Bibliography ==
- Dyer, Frederick H. (1959). A Compendium of the War of the Rebellion. New York and London. Thomas Yoseloff, Publisher. LCCN 59-12963.
- Holloway, William R. (2004). Civil War Regiments From Indiana. eBookOnDisk.com Pensacola, Florida. ISBN 1-9321-5731-X.
- Terrell, W.H.H. (1867). The Report of the Adjutant General of the State of Indiana. Containing Rosters for the Years 1861–1865, Volume 7. Indianapolis, Indiana. Samuel M. Douglass, State Printer.
