= 146th Illinois Infantry Regiment =

146th Regiment Illinois Volunteer Infantry
- Illinois state flag
- Active: September 18, 1864, to July 5, 1865
- Country: United States
- Allegiance: Union
- Branch: Infantry
- Role: Guard duty
- Engagements: None

The 146th Regiment Illinois Volunteer Infantry was an infantry regiment that served in the Union Army during the American Civil War.

== Service ==
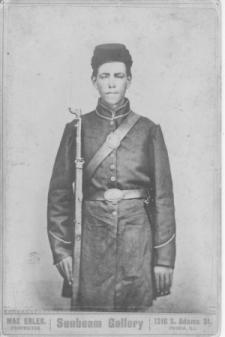
Pvt. Isaac Hiner of Co. I, Max Erler, Peoria, IL

The 146th Illinois Infantry was organized at Camp Butler, Illinois, and mustered into Federal service on September 18, 1864, for a one-year enlistment. The regiment were sent to various locations in Illinois such as Brighton, Quincy and Jacksonville, performing guard duty on drafted men and substitutes. The remaining companies were assigned to guard duty at Camp Butler, Illinois.

The regiment was mustered out of service on July 5, 1865.

== Total strength and casualties ==
The regiment suffered 38 enlisted men who died of disease for a total of 38 fatalities.

== Commanders ==
- Colonel Henry H. Dean - mustered out with the regiment.

== See also ==
- List of Illinois Civil War Units
- Illinois in the American Civil War
