= 145th Indiana Infantry Regiment =

- Active: February 16, 1865 – January 21, 1866
- Disbanded: January 21, 1866
- Country: United States
- Allegiance: Union
- Branch: Infantry
- Size: Regiment (Note: According to W.H.H. Terrell (1867), The Report of the Adjutant General of the State of Indiana. Containing Rosters for the Years 1861–1865, Volume 7, the 145th Indiana Infantry Regiment was composed of ten companies. Companies "A" to "I" and "K".)
- Engagements: American Civil War

Commanders
- Colonel: Will A. Adams
- Lt. Colonel: John P. Douglas
- Major: Vinson Williams

The 145th Indiana Infantry Regiment was an infantry regiment from Indiana that served in the Union Army between February 16, 1865, and January 21, 1866, during the American Civil War. The unit was organized very late in the war, and its service consisted of a few skirmishes and guard duty.

== Service ==
The 145th Indiana Regiment was raised in the 3rd district and organized at Indianapolis, Indiana, with a strength of 1,023 men and mustered in on February 16, 1865. It was ordered to Nashville, Tennessee between February 18 and 21. On February 22, the regiment was moved to Chattanooga and then proceeded to Dalton, Georgia. The regiment was engaged in skirmishes at Spring Place (now Chatsworth, Georgia), on both February 27 and April 20.

Skirmishes were fought, by a detachment, near Tunnel Hill, Georgia, on March 3. After the skirmishes at Tunnel Hill, the regiment performed railroad guard duty at Dalton, Marietta and Cuthbert, Georgia until late January 1866. The regiment was mustered out on January 21, 1866. During its service, the regiment incurred sixty-eight fatalities, another fifty-five deserted.

== See also ==
- List of Indiana Civil War regiments

== Bibliography ==
- Dyer, Frederick H. (1959). A Compendium of the War of the Rebellion. New York and London. Thomas Yoseloff, Publisher. LCCN 59-12963.
- Holloway, William R. (2004). Civil War Regiments From Indiana. eBookOnDisk.com Pensacola, Florida. ISBN 1-9321-5731-X.
- Terrell, W.H.H. (1867). The Report of the Adjutant General of the State of Indiana. Containing Rosters for the Years 1861–1865, Volume 7. Indianapolis, Indiana. Samuel M. Douglass, State Printer.
