= 140th Indiana Infantry Regiment =

- Active: October 24, 1864 – July 11, 1865
- Disbanded: July 11, 1865
- Country: United States
- Allegiance: Union
- Branch: Infantry
- Size: Regiment
- Engagements: American Civil War: Capture of Wilmington; Campaign of the Carolinas

The 140th Indiana Infantry Regiment served in the Union Army between October 24, 1864, and July 11, 1865, during the American Civil War.

== Service ==
The regiment was organized at Indianapolis, Indiana, and mustered in on November 3, 1864. It left Indiana for Nashville, Tennessee, on November 15. The regiment moved to Murfreesboro, Tennessee, where it was involved in the Siege of Murfreesboro, between December 5 and 12, 1864. It was involved in the defences of Nashville and Chattanooga Railroad, until January 1865.

From early January 1865, the regiment was continually on the move. From Nashville, they went to Clifton, Tennessee, reaching Clifton between January 2 and 6. From Tennessee they moved to Washington, D.C.; then to Fort Fisher, North Carolina, remaining there until February 7. It conducted operations against Robert F. Hoke's troops between February 11 and 14. From February 18 to 20, the regiment moved to Fort Anderson and from there to Town Creek. On February 22, the regiment fought in the Battle of Wilmington. From March 1 to April 26, the regiment was involved in the Campaign of the Carolinas and during this period advanced and occupied Goldsboro, North Carolina, before occupying Raleigh between April 10 and 14. On April 26, at Bennett Place, the regiment accepted the surrender of General Joseph E. Johnston and his army. Following the surrender, the regiment saw duty at Raleigh until May 6, and at Greensboro until early July. The regiment was mustered out on July 11, 1865. During its service the regiment lost three men during battle and 111 men to disease.

== See also ==
- List of Indiana Civil War regiments

== Bibliography ==
- Dyer, Frederick H. (1959). A Compendium of the War of the Rebellion. New York and London. Thomas Yoseloff, Publisher. LCCN 59-12963.
