= 1st Indiana Cavalry Regiment =

- Active: 1861–1865
- Disbanded: June 22, 1865
- Country: United States
- Allegiance: Indiana
- Branch: Volunteers
- Type: Cavalry
- Size: Regiment
- Engagements: American Civil War; Engagement at Fredericktown; Battle of Cotton Plant; Yazoo Pass Expedition; Battle of Port Gibson; Battle of Champion Hill; Siege of Vicksburg; Battle of Jackson; Bayou Teche Campaign; Battle of Helena; Battle of Bayou Fourche; Battle of Pine Bluff; Battle of Mount Elba; Battle of Marks' Mills

Commanders
- Notable commanders: Conrad Baker

1st Indiana Cavalry Regiment was a cavalry unit that served in the Union Army during the American Civil War. Organized in August 1861, it did most of its fighting in the state of Arkansas. The regiment was in action at Cotton Plant, Helena, Bayou Fourche, Pine Bluff, Mount Elba, and Marks' Mills. One company, company C, was detached from the rest of the regiment and fought in several actions in the Vicksburg campaign. The regiment was discharged in June 1865.

== Organizations ==
Organized at Evansville, Ind., and mustered on August 20, 1861. Left State for St. Louis, Mo., August 21; thence moved to Ironton, Mo. Duty at and near Ironton until February, 1862. Skirmish at Black River, Ironton, September 12, 1861. Operations about Ironton and Fredericktown October 12–21. Skirmish at Fredericktown October 18. Action at Fredericktown October 21. Attached to Dept. of Missouri to February, 1862. District of Southeast Missouri to May, 1862. 1st Division, Army of Southwest Missouri, to July, 1862. District of Eastern Arkansas, Dept. of Missouri, to December, 1862. 1st Brigade, 3rd (Cavalry) Division, District of Eastern Arkansas, Dept. of the Tennessee, to April, 1863. 1st Brigade, 2nd Cavalry Division, 13th Army Corps, Dept. of the Tennessee, to April, 1863. 1st Brigade, Cavalry Division, District of Eastern Arkansas, to June, 1863. Clayton's Independent Cavalry Brigade, District of Eastern Arkansas, to July, 1863. Clayton's Cavalry Brigade, 13th Division, 16th Army Corps, to August, 1863. Clayton's Cavalry Brigade, Arkansas Expedition, to January, 1864. Clayton's Cavalry Brigade, 7th Army Corps, Dept. of Arkansas, to September, 1864. 1st Brigade, Cavalry Division, 7th Army Corps, to February, 1865. Mouth of White River, Ark., and St. Charles, Ark. 7th Army Corps to June, 1865. Company "C" detached and with 12th Division, 13th Army Corps, Army of the Tennessee, to August, 1863. Cavalry Brigade, 13th Army Corps, Dept. of the Gulf, to September, 1863. 2nd Brigade, Cavalry Division, Dept. of the Gulf, to November, 1863. 3rd Brigade, Cavalry Division, Dept. of the Gulf, to December, 1863. Defenses of New Orleans, La., Dept. of the Gulf, to July. 1864. Rejoined Regiment at Pine Bluff, Ark. (For Companies "I" and "K" see Stewart's and Bracken's Cavalry Companies.)

Original Organization of Regiment.
Company	Primary Place of Recruitment	Earliest Captain
A	Vanderburg, Spencer, Gibson, Posey, Pike, Perry and Warrick Counties	William C. Browe
B	Vanderburg, Posey, Gibson, Warrick, Marion, and Vanderburgh Counties	Will H. Walker
C	Posey County	John K. Highman
D	Posey County	Lyman W. Brown
E	Crawford County	Robert E. Clendenin
F	Spencer County	John A. Stocking
G	Warrick County	Thomas Newsome Pace
H	Posey County	James H. Barter
I	Vigo County	Robert R. Stewart
K	Marion County	James R. Bracken
L	No cities or counties given	George A. May
M	No cities or counties given	John C. Tobias

== History ==
Scouting and skirmishing in Missouri and Arkansas February to June, 1862. Reconnaissance from Greenville to St. Francisville February 23–25 (Detachment). Mingo Creek, near St. Francisville, February 24 (Detachment). Moved to Doniphan March 27 – April 1, and to Pocahontas April 17. Litchfield, Ark., May 2. Eleven Points June 1. Operations in Fulton County, Mo., June 1–5. March to Helena, Ark., June 26 – July 14. Hill's Plantation, Cache River, July 7. Duty at Helena until July, 1863. Expedition from Helena to Clarendon August 4–17, 1862. Expedition from Clarendon to Lawrenceville and St. Charles September 11–13. Expedition from Helena to Moro November 5–8 (Detachment). Expedition from Helena to Arkansas Post November 16–21. Expedition from Helena to Grenada, Miss., November 27 – December 5. Junction Coldwater and Tallahatchie Rivers November 29. Tallahatchie River November 30 (Detachment). Near Mitchell's Cross Roads December 1. Oakland December 3. Near Coldwater River February 19, 1863. Near Yazoo Pass February 19 (Detachment). Coldwater March 14. Languelle Creek May 11. Taylor's Creek and Crowley's Ridge May 11. Expedition from Helena to Napoleonville May 23–26 (Detachment). Near Island No. 65, Mississippi River, May 25 (Detachment). Repulse of Holmes' Attack on Helena July 4. Steele's Expedition to Little Rock August 1 – September 14. Action at Bayou Fourche and capture of Little Rock September 10. Pursuit of Price September 11–14. Near Little Rock September 11. Moved to Pine Bluff September 14, and duty there until March, 1864. Tulip October 12, 1863. Pine Bluff October 25. Branchville, Ivey's Ford, Pine Bluff, January 19, 1864. Steele's Expedition to Camden February 23 – May 3. Branchville March 27. Expedition from Pine Bluff to Mt. Elba and Longview March 27–31. Longview March 29. Mt. Elba and pursuit to Big Creek March 30. Marks' Mills April 25 (Detachment). At Pine Bluff and Little Rock until October, 1864. Walter's Plantation June 7. Expedition from Pine Bluff September 9–11 (Detachment). Near Monticello September 10. Brewer's Lane September 11. Near Pine Bluff September 13 (2 Companies). Reconnaissance from Little Rock to Monticello and Mt. Elba October 4–11. Veterans and Recruits consolidated to a Battalion of 2 Companies, and duty at Pine Bluff until January, 1865. Moved to mouth of White River and duty there until March 20, 1865. At St. Charles until June, 1865. Mustered out May 31 and discharged June 22, 1865. Company "C" detached as escort to Gen. Hovey, February to July, 1863. Expedition to Yazoo Pass February 24 – April 8, 1863. Moved to Milliken's Bend, La., April 12. Advance on Bruinsburg and turning Grand Gulf April 25–30. Battle of Port Gibson May 1. Fourteen-Mile Creek May 12–13. Battle of Champion's Hill May 16. Siege of Vicksburg May 18 – July 4. Advance on Jackson, Miss., July 4–10. Siege of Jackson July 10–17. Ordered to New Orleans, La., August, thence to Brashear City and Berwick; Western Louisiana "Teche" Campaign October 3 – November 30. Reconnaissance toward Opelousas October 20. Opelousas and Barre Landing October 21. Bayou Portage October 23. Moved to New Orleans, La., and duty there until July 7, 1864. Cypress Creek March 8, 1864. Rejoined Regiment at Pine Bluff, Ark.

== Commanders ==
- Colonel Conrad Baker: July 20, 1861 - June 22, 1865.

== Casualties ==
Regiment lost during service 4 Officers and 32 Enlisted men killed and mortally wounded and 3 Officers and 148 Enlisted men by disease. Total 187.

== Notable people ==
- Conrad Baker: Indiana politician and future Governor of Indiana.
- William Fortune: An Indianapolis businessman and newspaper printer.

== See also ==
- List of Indiana Civil War regiments
