= 87th Indiana Infantry Regiment =

87th Regiment Indiana Infantry
- Active: August 31, 1862 – June 10, 1865
- Country: United States
- Allegiance: Union
- Branch: Infantry
- Engagements: Battle of Perryville; Tullahoma Campaign; Battle of Chickamauga; Siege of Chattanooga; Battle of Missionary Ridge; Atlanta campaign Battle of Resaca; Battle of Kennesaw Mountain; Siege of Atlanta; Battle of Jonesborough; Sherman's March to the Sea; Carolinas campaign Battle of Bentonville

The 87th Regiment Indiana Infantry was an infantry regiment that served in the Union Army during the American Civil War.

== Service ==
The 87th Indiana Infantry was organized at South Bend, Indiana and mustered in for a three-year enlistment on August 31, 1862, under the command of Colonel Kline G. Shryock.

The regiment was attached to 3rd Brigade, 1st Division, Army of the Ohio, September 1862. 3rd Brigade, 1st Division, III Corps, Army of the Ohio, to November 1862. 3rd Brigade, 3rd Division, Center, XIV Corps, Army of the Cumberland, to January 1863. 3rd Brigade, 3rd Division, XIV Corps, Army of the Cumberland, to October 1863. 2nd Brigade, 3rd Division, XIV Corps, to June 1865.

The 87th Indiana Infantry mustered out of service on June 10, 1865.

== Detailed service ==
Ordered to Louisville, Kentucky, August 31. Pursuit of Bragg to Crab Orchard, Kentucky, October 1–15, 1862. Battle of Perryville, October 8. March to Nashville, Tennessee, October 16-November 7. Duty South Tunnel, Pilot Knob, and Gallatin, Tennessee, November 8–26, and guarding fords of the Cumberland until January 29, 1863. Duty at Nashville, Tennessee, until March 6. Duty at Triune until June. Expedition toward Columbia, Tennessee, March 4–14. Franklin June 4–5. Tullahoma Campaign June 23-July 7. Hoover's Gap June 24–26. Occupation of middle Tennessee until August 16. Passage of the Cumberland Mountains and Tennessee River and Chickamauga Campaign August 16-September 22. Battle of Chickamauga September 19–21. Siege of Chattanooga, September 24-November 23. Chattanooga-Ringgold Campaign November 23–27. Orchard Knob November 23–24. Missionary Ridge November 25. Demonstration on Dalton, Georgia, February 22–27, 1864. Tunnel Hill, Buzzard's Roost Gap, and Rocky Faced Ridge February 23–25. Reconnaissance from Ringgold toward Tunnel Hill April 29. Atlanta Campaign May 1 to September 8. Demonstration on Rocky Faced Ridge May 8–11. Battle of Resaca May 14–15. Advance on Dallas May 18–25. Operations on line of Pumpkin Vine Creek and battles about Dallas, New Hope Church, and Allatoona Hills May 25-June 5. Operations about Marietta and against Kennesaw Mountain June 10-July 2. Pine Hill June 11–14. Lost Mountain June 15–17. Assault on Kennesaw June 27. Ruff's or Neal Dow Station July 4. Chattahoochie River July 5–17. Peachtree Creek July 19–20. Siege of Atlanta July 22-August 25. Utoy Creek August 7. Flank movement on Jonesboro August 25–30. Battle of Jonesboro August 31-September 1. Operations against Hood in northern Georgia and northern Alabama September 29-November 3. March to the sea November 15-December 10. Siege of Savannah December 10–21. Campaign of the Carolinas January to April 1865. Fayetteville, North Carolina, March 11. Averysboro March 16. Battle at Bentonville March 19–21. Occupation of Goldsboro March 24. Advance on Raleigh April 10–14. Occupation of Raleigh April 14. Bennett's House April 26. Surrender of Johnston and his army. March to Washington, D.C., via Richmond, Virginia, April 29-May 19. Grand Review of the Armies May 24.

== Casualties ==
The regiment lost a total of 283 men during service; 10 officers and 81 enlisted men killed or mortally wounded, 2 officers and 190 enlisted men died of disease.

== Commanders ==
- Colonel Kline G. Shryock
- Colonel Newell Gleason

== See also ==
- List of Indiana Civil War regiments
- Indiana in the Civil War
