= 143rd Indiana Infantry Regiment =

- Active: February 21 – October 17, 1865
- Disbanded: October 17, 1865
- Country: United States
- Allegiance: Union
- Branch: Infantry
- Size: Regiment (Note: According to W.H.H. Terrell (1867), The Report of the Adjutant General of the State of Indiana. Containing Rosters for the Years 1861–1865, Volume 7, the 143rd Indiana Infantry Regiment was composed of ten companies. Companies "A" to "I" and "K".)
- Garrison/HQ: Nashville, Clarksville and Fort Donelson, Tennessee
- Engagements: American Civil War

Commanders
- Colonel: John F. Grill
- Lt. Colonel: John T. McQuiddy
- Major: John E. Phillips

The 143rd Indiana Infantry Regiment was an infantry regiment from Indiana that served in the Union Army between February 21 and October 17, 1865, during the American Civil War.

== Service ==
The regiment was organized at Indianapolis, Indiana, with a strength of 1,006 men and mustered in on February 21, 1865. The 143rd was composed of companies from the 1st district, and left the state for Nashville, Tennessee, on February 24, then moved to Murfreesboro, Tennessee and duty there until May 13. It was attached to the 1st Brigade, 1st Sub-District, District of Middle Tennessee, Department of the Cumberland.

Between May 13 and June 26, the regiment was on duty at Tullahoma, Tennessee. In late June, the regiment moved to Clarksville where three companies were detached and sent to Fort Donelson, Tennessee. In October, the regiment was reunited and ordered to Nashville, where it was mustered out on October 17, 1865. During its service the regiment incurred ninety fatalities, another seventy-eight deserted and four unaccounted for.

== See also ==
- List of Indiana Civil War regiments

== Bibliography ==
- Dyer, Frederick H. (1959). A Compendium of the War of the Rebellion. New York and London. Thomas Yoseloff, Publisher. LCCN 59-12963.
- Holloway, William R. (2004). Civil War Regiments From Indiana. eBookOnDisk.com Pensacola, Florida. ISBN 1-9321-5731-X.
- Terrell, W.H.H. (1867). The Report of the Adjutant General of the State of Indiana. Containing Rosters for the Years 1861–1865, Volume 7. Indianapolis, Indiana. Samuel M. Douglass, State Printer.
