= Utoy Creek =

Georgia tributary of Chattahoochee

Coordinates: 33°44′44.39″N 84°34′19.76″W

Utoy Creek is a stream in the U.S. state of Georgia. It is a tributary to the Chattahoochee River.

Utoy Creek most likely was named for the Utoy Indians. The Battle of Utoy Creek was fought here in 1864.
