= Jordan Springs, Virginia =

Unincorporated community in Virginia, United States

- Unincorporated community
- Location within Virginia Location within the United States
- Coordinates: 39°12′55″N 78°5′2″W
- Country: United States
- State: Virginia
- County: Frederick
- Time zone: UTC−5 (Eastern (EST))
  - Summer (DST): UTC−4 (EDT)
- GNIS feature ID: 1499612

Jordan Springs is an unincorporated community located approximately four miles from Winchester, Virginia, United States. It was named after a plantation and resort developed there by the Jordan family, based on natural sulphur springs which had been known for centuries to local Native Americans.

In 1800, the Jordan White Sulphur Springs resort was established here, as people believed the springs had healing properties. Generations of the Jordan family developed three hotels on the site. David Holmes, a five-term US Congressman from Virginia's 2nd congressional district, appointed governor of Mississippi Territory, and first elected governor of the state of Mississippi, came here in declining health, dying here in 1832.

The historic Jordan Springs Hotel was built in 1893 at this location, building on the destination's appeal. Today it is located along Lick Run in Frederick County, Virginia, on Jordan Springs Road (VA 664) to the north of Devils Backbone. It followed two other hotels on the site, developed by the Jordan family. Competition with other sites and changing taste reduced its business.

In 1953, the property was bought by the Missionary Servants of the Most Holy Trinity. They operated the property as a Catholic Monastery and Seminary. Faced with declining vocations, they leased the space to Shalom et Benedictus for a drug and alcohol rehabilitation center. It operated until 1999.

Today, the 48,000-square-foot (4,500 m^{2}) historic building, known as the Historic Jordan Springs Event & Cultural Centre, is operated as a wedding, event, and conference center. It also provides business space to County Court Reporters. The property is owned and managed by Tonie Wallace-Aitken and Greig Aitken, with assistance from the property event coordinator, Colt Nutter. Its mail address is Stephenson, Virginia.

== Roads ==
- Jordan Springs Road (SR 664)
- Woods Mill Road (SR 660)
- Monastery Ridge Road
