= 125th Ohio Infantry Regiment =

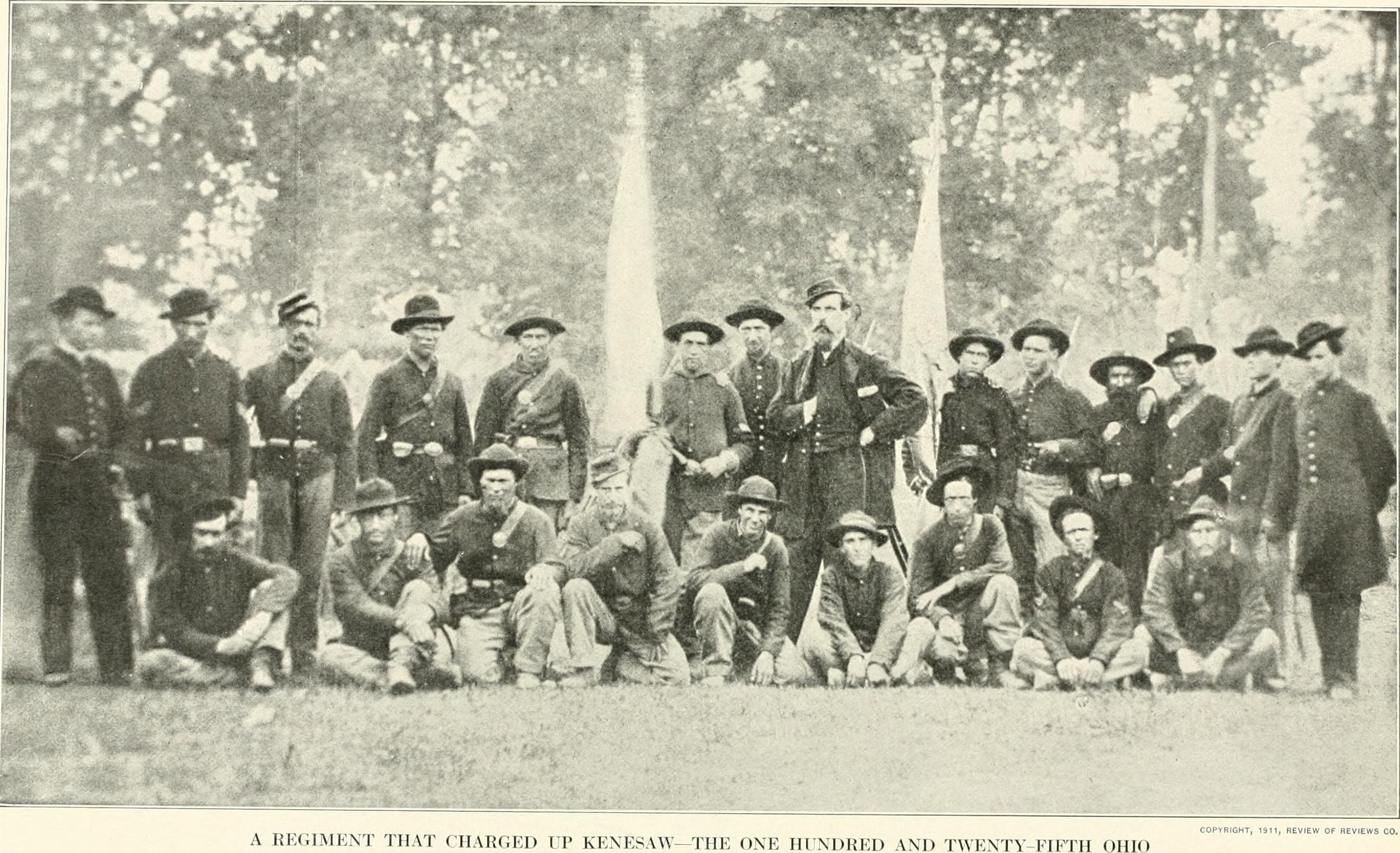
- 125th Ohio Volunteer Infantry Regiment, Company “H”, Captain Anthony Vallender (center, hand in vest) at Nashville, June 1865
- Active: October 6, 1862, to September 25, 1865
- Country: United States
- Allegiance: Union
- Branch: Infantry
- Nickname: Opdycke's Tigers
- Engagements: First Battle of Franklin; Battle of Chickamauga; Battle of Mission Ridge; Battle of Dandridge; Battle of Rocky Face Ridge; Battle of Resaca; Battle of Adairsville; Battle at Cassville, Georgia; Battle of New Hope Church; Battle of Pine Mountain; Battle of Marietta; Battle of Muddy Creek; Battle of Kennesaw Mountain; Battle of Buck Head Creek; Battle of Peachtree Creek; Siege of Atlanta; Battle of Jonesborough; Battle of Lovejoy's Station; Battle of Spring Hill; Second Battle of Franklin; Battle of Nashville

Insignia
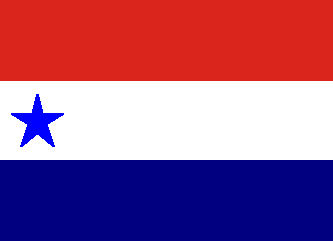
- 1st Division, XXI Corps

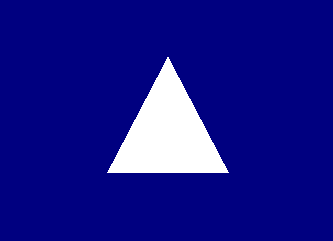
- 2nd Division, IV Corps

The 125th Ohio Infantry Regiment, sometimes 125th Ohio Volunteer Infantry (or 125th OVI) was an infantry regiment in the Union Army during the American Civil War.

== Service ==
The 125th Ohio Infantry was organized at Camp Taylor, Cleveland, Ohio, and mustered in three years of service on October 6, 1862, under the command of colonel Emerson Opdycke.

The regiment was attached to 3rd Brigade, 1st Division, XXI Corps (Union Army), in Major General William S. Rosecrans' Army of the Cumberland, till October 1863. 3rd Brigade, 2nd Division, IV Corps (Union Army) of the Cumberland, till October, 1864. 1st Brigade, 2nd Division, 4th Army Corps and Dept. of Texas, till September, 1865. The 125th Ohio Infantry mustered out of service on September 25, 1865.

Primarily involved in long marches and skirmishes until Battle of Chickamauga, fighting against the odds. After Chickamauga, Gen. Rosecrans was replaced by Maj. Gen. George H. Thomas, 'The Rock of Chickamauga'.

The 125th then participated in the Battle of Missionary Ridge, and helped to push Braxton Bragg's men away from Chattanooga, Tennessee. In the spring of 1864, it joined William Tecumseh Sherman in his Atlanta campaign. They fought all the way until the end, at the Battle of Jonesborough, and then followed confederate Lt. Gen. John Bell Hood North to Nashville, Tennessee

In Colonel Opdycke's brigade, it fought in Battle of Franklin and the union victory at Nashville. The 125th OVI gained a high reputation for its fighting qualities.

== Casualties ==
The regiment lost a total of 225 men during service; 7 officers and 104 enlisted men killed or mortally wounded, 114 enlisted men died of disease.

== Commanders ==
- Colonel - Emerson Opdycke
- Lt. Colonel - Henry B. Banning
- Captain Edward P. Bates
- Major George L. Wood
- Major Joseph Bruff
- Lt. Colonel Thomas H. Moore
- Adjutant Ridgley C. Powers

== Gallery ==
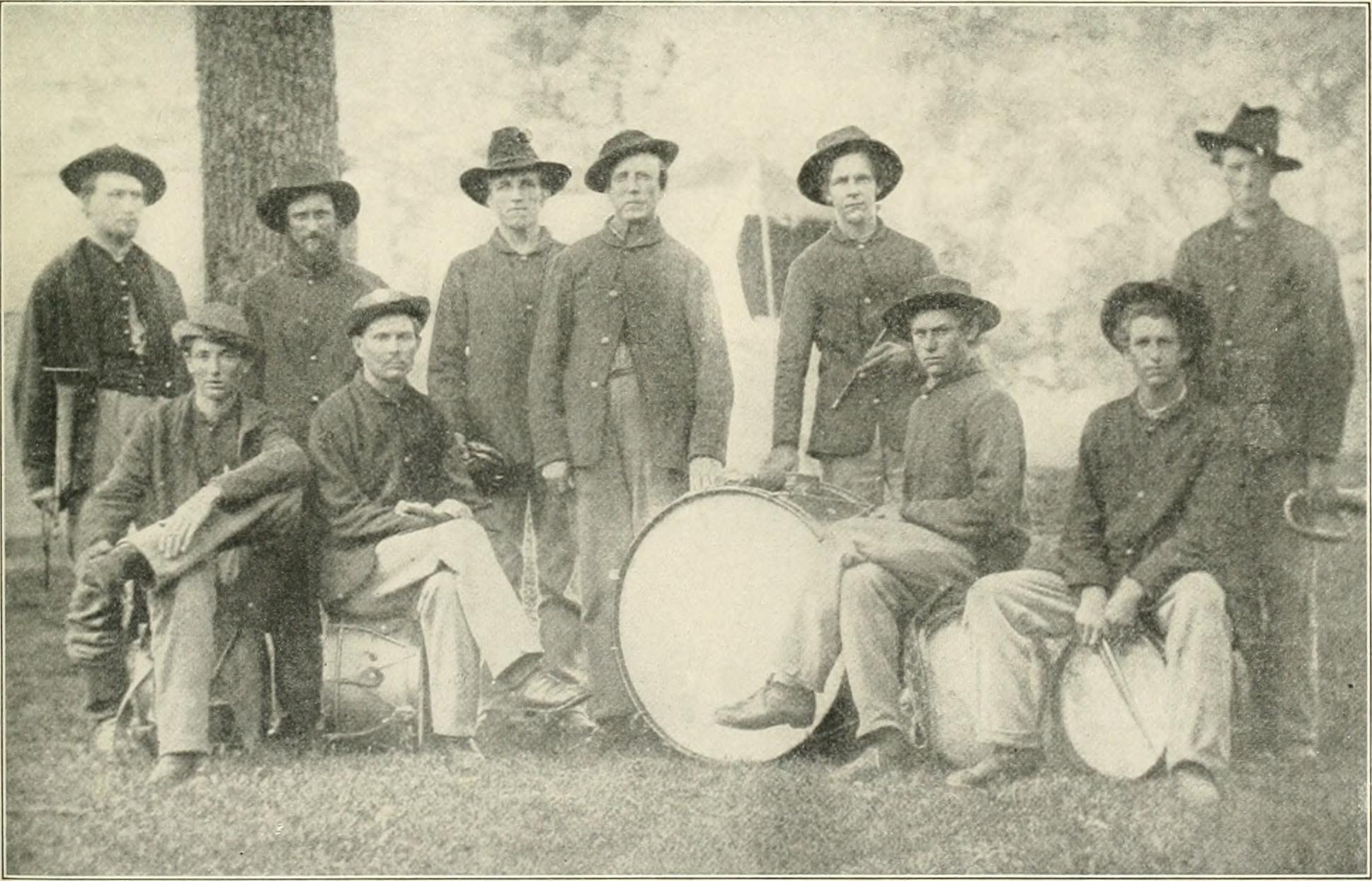
The Tiger Band
