= Robert C. Bradshaw =

Robert Charles Bradshaw
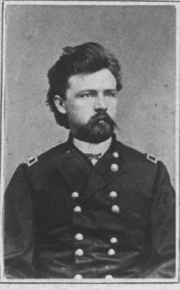
- Born: March 13, 1840; Weston, Missouri, U.S.
- Died: May 27, 1927 (aged 87); Kansas City, Missouri, U.S.
- Burial place: Mount Washington Cemetery, Independence, Missouri, U.S.
- Military career
- Allegiance: United States (Union)
- Branch: United States Army (Union Army)
- Service years: 1861 – 1865
- Rank: Colonel; Bvt. Brigadier General
- Unit: 13th Missouri Infantry Regiment
- Commands: 44th Missouri Infantry Regiment
- Conflicts: American Civil War; Franklin–Nashville campaign; Battle of Spring Hill; Battle of Franklin

Robert Charles Bradshaw (1840–1927) was an American Brevet Brigadier General during the American Civil War. He commanded the 44th Missouri Infantry Regiment throughout various battles of the Franklin–Nashville campaign.

== Biography ==
Around the beginning of the American Civil War, Bradshaw enlisted in the 13th Missouri Infantry Regiment as a private before being promoted on June 20, 1861 to 2nd Lieutenant of the regiment. He was also promoted to 1st Lieutenant on August 1, 1861 and to Captain in May 16, 1862. After being promoted to Major and Lieutenant Colonel on July 13 and July 15, 1864 respectively, Bradshaw was transferred to the 44th Missouri Infantry Regiment as its colonel on September 29 and was stationed at Rolla, Missouri. Bradshaw then participated at the Battle of Spring Hill and the Battle of Franklin during the Franklin–Nashville campaign. Bradshaw was then brevetted Brigadier General on March 13, 1865 for "gallant services during the war" and was honorably mustered out in August 1865.

== See also ==
- List of American Civil War brevet generals (Union)
