= Green Hill, Indiana =

- Unincorporated community and Census-designated place
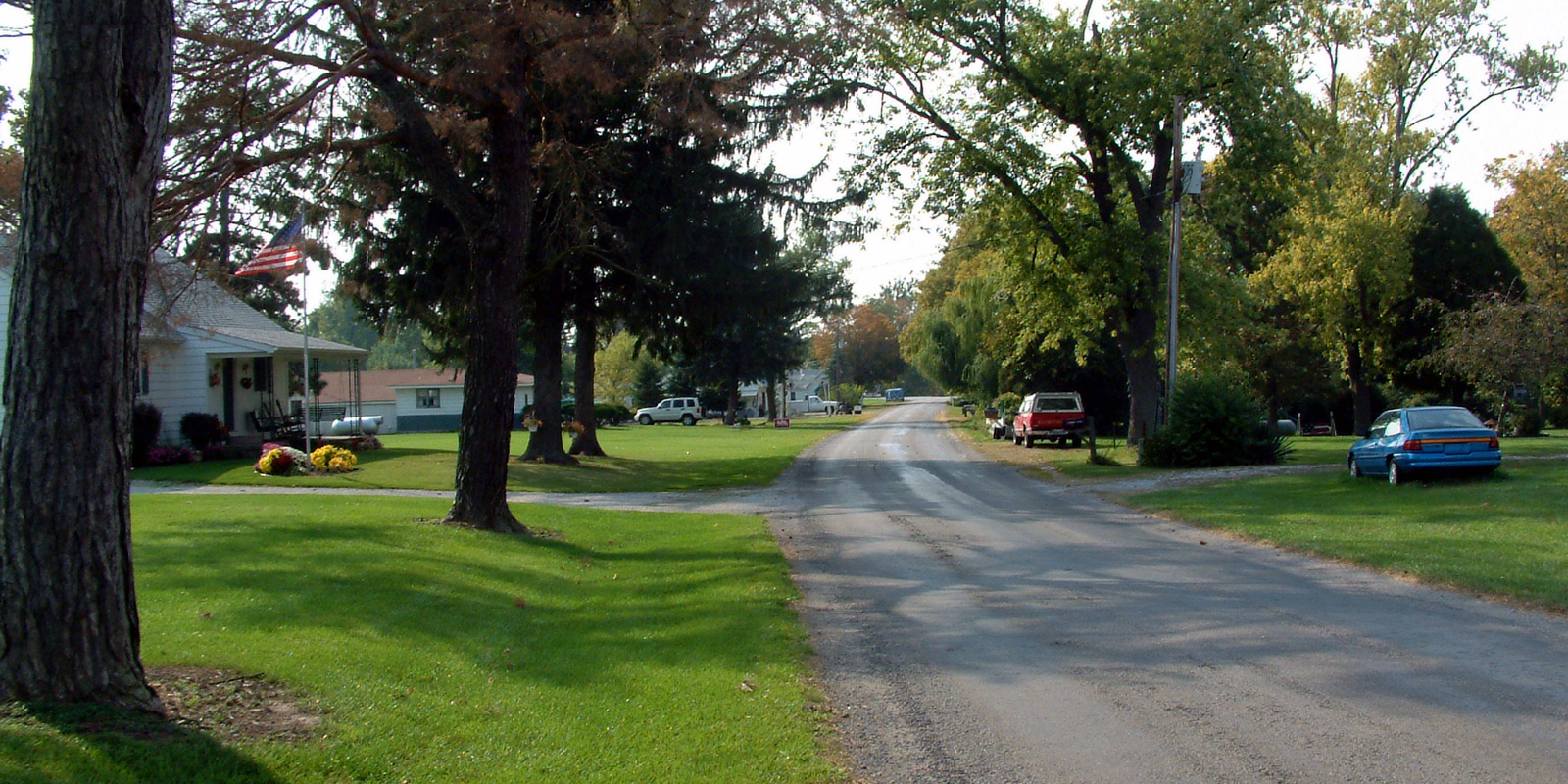
- Looking west along Pine Street.

- Location within Warren County, Indiana Location within Indiana Location within the United States
- Coordinates: 40°24′49″N 87°06′42″W
- Country: United States
- State: Indiana
- County: Warren
- Township: Medina
- Founded: 1832
- Founder: William and Horatio Bailey
- Named for: Green Hill Seminary

Area
  - Total: 0.47 sq mi (1.21 km^{2})
  - Land: 0.47 sq mi (1.21 km^{2})
  - Water: 0 sq mi (0.00 km^{2})
- Elevation: 653 ft (199 m)

Population (2020)
  - Total: 125
  - Density: 266.6/sq mi (102.95/km^{2})
- Time zone: UTC-5 (Eastern (EST))
  - Summer (DST): UTC-4 (EDT)
- ZIP code: 47970
- Area code: 765
- GNIS feature ID: 2806492

Green Hill is a small unincorporated community in Medina Township, Warren County, in the U.S. state of Indiana. As of the 2020 census, Green Hill had a population of 125.

== History ==
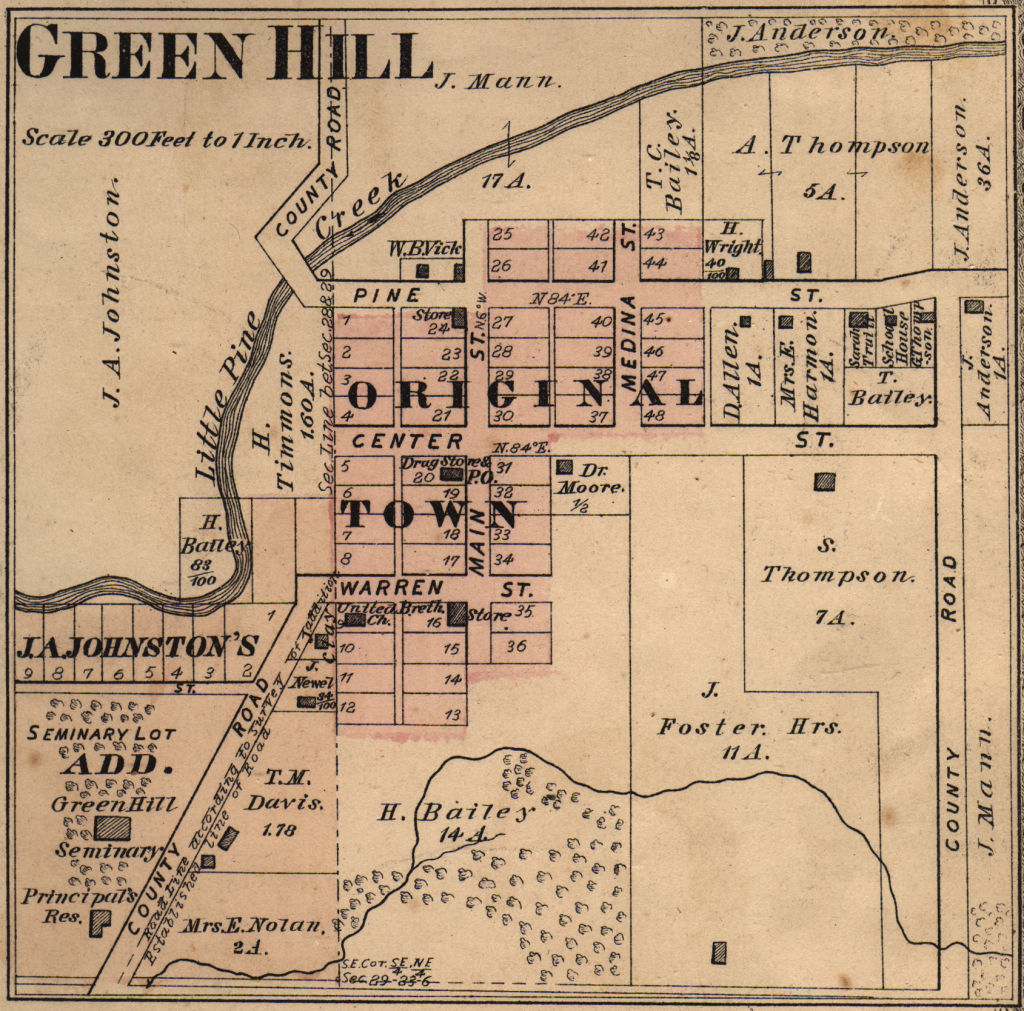
Map from 1877 atlas

The town was platted on March 5, 1832, by William B. Bailey and his brother Horatio who named it Milford, for their home town of Milford, Delaware. The plat included 48 lots, two north–south streets (Main and East) and three east–west streets (Pine, Center and Warren). The first store opened in 1833 and was followed in subsequent years by several more businesses, including a liquor store, blacksmith, grocery, tannery, shoe-maker, wagon-maker and others. A post office was established on December 2, 1837, as Poolesville, in honor of the town's first resident physician, Dr. Poole — it retained the name until August 13, 1904.

In 1869 the citizens of the town voted to incorporate, and renamed it from Milford to Green Hill, owing to the town's Green Hill Seminary which the United Brethren established there. An 1883 history of the area cited Green Hill's population as "over two hundred".

In common with many other small Midwestern communities, Green Hill diminished during the 20th century as its rural population dwindled or moved to more urban areas. Current population in undetermined, but satellite photography shows perhaps 30 homes in and around the town.

One of Green Hill's most notable natives is NASA astronaut Donald E. Williams, who served as pilot on the Space Shuttle Discovery (STS-51-D) in 1985 and as commander of the Atlantis (STS-34) in 1989.

Civil War general George Day Wagner was raised on a farm near Green Hill, and is buried in Armstrong Cemetery.

== Geography ==
Green Hill is located in the far northeastern part of the county, about 13 miles (21 km) northeast of the county seat of Williamsport, 5 miles (8.0 km) south of Otterbein and less than a mile from the border with Tippecanoe County. It overlooks Little Pine Creek which flows along its north and west.

== Demographics ==
Historical population
Census	Pop.	Note	%±
2020	125		—
U.S. Decennial Census

== Education ==
It is in the Benton Community School Corporation.
