= 100th Ohio Infantry Regiment =

- Active: July 1862 to July 1, 1865
- Country: United States
- Allegiance: Union
- Branch: Infantry
- Engagements: Defense of Cincinnati; Knoxville Campaign; Atlanta campaign; Battle of Resaca; Battle of Dallas; Battle of New Hope Church; Battle of Allatoona; Battle of Kennesaw Mountain; Battle of Peachtree Creek; Siege of Atlanta; Battle of Jonesboro; Battle of Lovejoy's Station; Second Battle of Franklin; Battle of Wilmington

The 100th Ohio Infantry Regiment, sometimes 100th Ohio Volunteer Infantry (or 100th OVI) was an infantry regiment in the Union Army during the American Civil War.

== Service ==
The 100th Ohio Volunteer Infantry was recruiting during the late summer of 1862, from areas across Northwest Ohio.

100th Ohio Infantry Recruitment Areas
Regimental Company	Area/Towns
Company A	Toledo, Perrysburg, Wood County
Company B	Napoleon, Henry County
Company C	Bryan, Williams County
Company D	Defiance, Defiance County
Company E	Toledo, Fulton County
Company F	Waterville, Maumee, Lucas County
Company G	Elmore, Genoa, Oak Harbor, Ottawa County
Company H	Wauseon, Fulton County
Company I	Antwerp, Paulding County
Company K	Fremont, Sandusky County

The 100th Ohio Infantry was organized in Toledo, Ohio July through September 1862 and mustered in for three years service under the command of Colonel John C. Groom.

The regiment was attached to 2nd Brigade, 1st Division, Army of Kentucky, Department of the Ohio, to October 1862. 2nd Brigade, 2nd Division, Army of Kentucky, to January 1863. District of Central Kentucky, Department of the Ohio, to June 1863. 2nd Brigade, 1st Division, XXIII Corps, Army of the Ohio, to July 1863. 2nd Brigade, 4th Division, XXIII Corps, to August 1863. 1st Brigade, 3rd Division, XXIII Corps, to February 1865. 1st Brigade, 3rd Division, XXIII Corps, Department of North Carolina, to June 1865.

The 100th Ohio Infantry mustered out of service on June 20, 1865, at Greensboro, North Carolina, and was discharged on July 1, 1865, at Cleveland, Ohio.

== Detailed service ==
Ordered to Cincinnati, Ohio, September 8, thence to Covington, Ky., and duty there until October 8. Ordered to Lexington, Ky., October 8, 1862, then to Richmond, Ky., December 1, and to Danville, Ky., December 26. To Frankfort, Ky., January 3, 1863. Duty at various points in central Kentucky until August. Expedition to Monticello and operations in southeastern Kentucky April 26-May 12. Burnside's Campaign in eastern Tennessee August 16-October 17. Telford Station and Limestone September 8. (240 men captured at Telford Station while guarding railroad.) Knoxville Campaign November 4-December 23. Siege of Knoxville November 17-December 5. Pursuit to Blain's Cross Roads. Duty at Blain's Cross Roads until April 1864. Atlanta Campaign May 1-September 8. Demonstrations on Rocky Faced Ridge May 8–11. Battle of Resaca May 14–15. Cartersville May 20. Operations on line of Pumpkin Vine Creek and battles about Dallas, New Hope Church, and Allatoona Hills May 25-June 5. Operations about Marietta and against Kennesaw Mountain June 10-July 2. Lost Mountain June 15–17. Muddy Creek June 17. Noyes Creek June 19. Cheyney's Farm June 22. Near Marietta June 23. Assault on Kennesaw June 27. Nickajack Creek July 2–5. Chattahoochie River July 5–17. Peachtree Creek July 19–20. Siege of Atlanta July 22-August 25. Utoy Creek August 5–7. Flank movement on Jonesboro August 25–30. Battle of Jonesboro August 31-September 1. Lovejoy's Station September 2–6. Duty at Decatur until October 4. Pursuit of Hood into northern Alabama October 4–26. Nashville Campaign November–December. Columbia, Duck River, November 24–27. Battle of Franklin November 30. Battle of Nashville December 15–16. Pursuit of Hood to the Tennessee River December 17–28. At Clifton, Tenn., until January 16, 1865. Movement to Washington, D.C., then to Federal Point, N.C., January 16-February 9. Fort Anderson February 18–19. Town Creek February 19–20. Capture of Wilmington February 22. Campaign of the Carolinas March–April. Advance on Goldsboro, N.C., March 6–21. Occupation of Goldsboro March 21. Advance on Raleigh April 10–14. Near Raleigh April 13. Bennett's House April 26. Surrender of Johnston and his army. Duty at Greensboro, N.C. until June.

== Casualties ==
The regiment lost a total of 317 men during service; 3 officers and 90 enlisted men killed or mortally wounded, 6 officers and 268 enlisted men died of disease.

== Commanders ==
- Colonel John C. Groom
- Colonel Patrick Sumerville Slevin
- Colonel Edwin L. Hayes
- Lieutenant Colonel Frank Rundell

== See also ==
- List of Ohio Civil War units
- Ohio in the Civil War
