= Emerson Opdycke =

American businessman and Union Army brigadier general

Samuel Emerson Opdycke
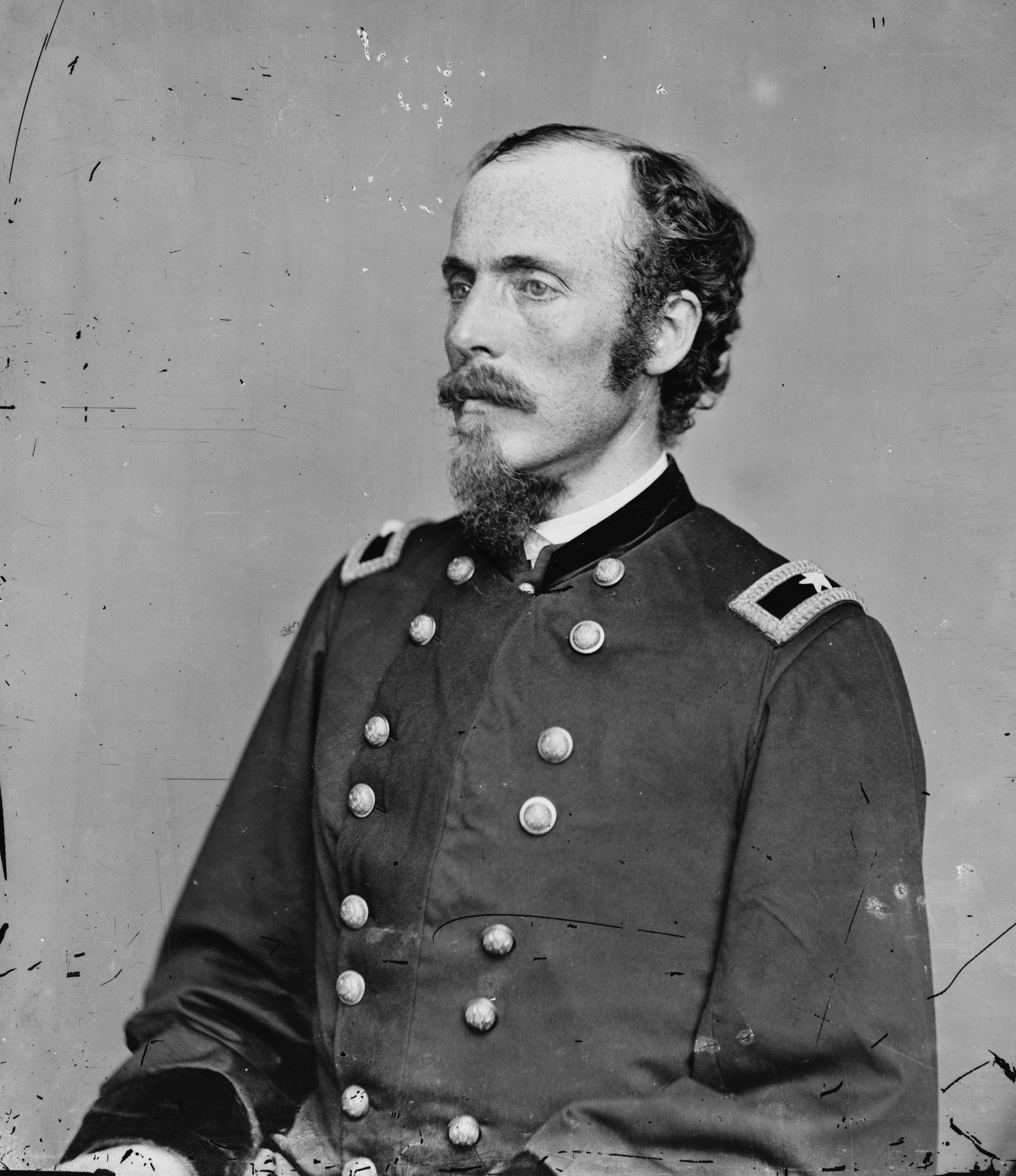
- Emerson Opdycke
- Born: January 7, 1830; Hubbard, Ohio
- Died: April 25, 1884 (aged 54); New York City, New York
- Burial place: Oakwood Cemetery, Warren, Ohio
- Military career
- Allegiance: United States of America; Union
- Branch: United States Army; Union Army
- Rank: Brigadier General; Brevet Major General
- Conflicts: American Civil War Battle of Chickamauga Chattanooga campaign Atlanta campaign Battle of Spring Hill Second Battle of Franklin Battle of Nashville

Samuel Emerson Opdycke (January 7, 1830 – April 25, 1884) was a businessman and Union Army brigadier general during the American Civil War.

== Early years ==
Opdycke was born on a farm in Hubbard, Ohio, to a military family. His father fought in the War of 1812 and his grandfather was a captain in New Jersey militia in the American Revolution. His older brother Henry served in the Kansas cavalry during the Civil War. Opdycke was educated in the Hubbard schools. He engaged in various business pursuits in Ohio and California.

== Civil War ==
Opdycke enlisted immediately following the First Battle of Bull Run and was commissioned a first lieutenant in the 41st Ohio Infantry on August 26, 1861. As a captain, he fought in the Battle of Shiloh. He resigned in September 1862 to help recruit the 125th Ohio Infantry, in which he became the lieutenant colonel on October 1, 1862, and the colonel on January 14, 1863. His regiment earned fame in the defense of Horseshoe Ridge at the Battle of Chickamauga. In command of a demi-brigade, Opdycke's men were some of the first to reach the summit of Missionary Ridge during the Battles for Chattanooga. He fought throughout the Atlanta Campaign with the Army of the Cumberland and was badly wounded at the Battle of Resaca, but he recovered sufficiently to lead an assault in the Battle of Kennesaw Mountain.

During the Franklin-Nashville Campaign, Opdycke distinguished himself at the Battle of Franklin. As the Confederate troops under Lt. Gen. John Bell Hood approached, his division commander, Brig. Gen. George D. Wagner, ordered Opdycke and the other two brigade commanders to take up hasty defensive positions in front of the Union fortified line. Opdycke challenged this order, argued with Wagner, and marched his men into a reserve position behind the fortifications. When the Confederate assault broke the Union line near the Columbia Pike, Opdycke quickly redeployed his men into line of battle, straddling the road, and they were confronted by masses of fleeing Union soldiers, pursued by Confederates. Opdycke ordered his brigade forward to the works. At the same time, his corps commander, Maj. Gen. David S. Stanley, arrived on the scene. He later wrote, "I saw Opdycke near the center of his line urging his men forward. I gave the Colonel no orders as I saw him engaged in doing the very thing to save us, to get possession of our line again." The counterattack turned the tide and the Union Army achieved an important victory.

Opdycke was honored for his service at Franklin with a brevet appointment to major general of volunteers. He was promoted to a full brigadier general on July 26, 1865.

== Postbellum life ==
Opdycke resigned from the army in 1866 and moved to New York City, where he engaged in the dry goods business. He wrote several articles on the war, and was active in veterans affairs. He died in New York at the age of 54 of an accidental gunshot to the abdomen, apparently while he was cleaning the weapon.

He is buried in Oakwood Cemetery in Warren, Ohio.

== See also ==
- List of American Civil War generals (Union)
