= George D. Wagner =

American politician

George Day Wagner
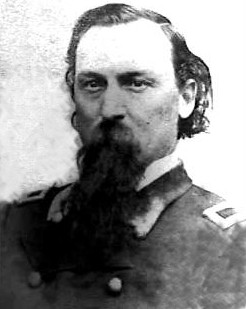
- George D. Wagner
- Born: September 22, 1829; Ross County, Ohio
- Died: February 13, 1869 (aged 39); Indianapolis, Indiana
- Burial place: Armstrong Cemetery, Green Hill, Indiana
- Military career
- Allegiance: United States of America | Union
- Branch: United States Army; Union Army
- Service years: 1861-1865
- Rank: Brigadier General
- Conflicts: American Civil War; Battle of Shiloh; Battle of Perryville; Battle of Stones River; Battle of Chickamauga; Chattanooga campaign; Battle of Missionary Ridge; Atlanta campaign; Battle of Kennesaw Mountain; Franklin-Nashville campaign; Battle of Franklin

George Day Wagner (September 22, 1829 – February 13, 1869) was an Indiana politician, farmer, and soldier, serving as a general in the Union Army during the American Civil War. His controversial actions at the Battle of Franklin in 1864 overshadowed his positive performance earlier in the war.

== Early life and career ==
Wagner was born in rural Ross County, Ohio. When he was four years old, Wagner's family moved to Warren County, Indiana, where he was educated in the common schools. He became a prosperous farmer, and was elected in 1856 as a Republican to the Indiana House of Representatives. Two years later, he was elected to the State Senate. He was selected as the president of the Indiana State Agricultural Society, a post he held when the Civil War began in April 1861 with the bombardment of Fort Sumter in South Carolina.

== Civil War service ==
In June of that year, Wagner enlisted in the state volunteer troops as colonel of the 15th Indiana Infantry and initially served in western Virginia. He commanded the 21st brigade in the Army of the Ohio during the Battle of Shiloh in April 1862. He subsequently participated in the Battle of Perryville and commanded the 21st brigade in the Army of the Cumberland at the Battle of Stones River at the end of the year.

In April 1863, he was promoted to brigadier general, backdated to November 29, 1862. Wagner commanded the 21st brigade during Maj. Gen. William S. Rosecrans's occupation of Chattanooga, Tennessee, in September 1863. Wagner's 21st brigade was kept as the garrison force in Chattanooga during the battle of Chickamauga. His men suffered heavy losses in an assault on Missionary Ridge during the Chattanooga campaign. Wagner was again active in the 1864 Atlanta campaign, commanding the 2nd Brigade, 2nd Division (Newton) in the IV Corps, which suffered exceptionally heavy losses at the Battle of Kennesaw Mountain, and a division during the Franklin-Nashville campaign.

His military career was ruined at the Battle of Franklin. He diverged from the orders of his superior, Brig. Gen. Jacob D. Cox, to withdraw his outnumbered force from an exposed forward position. Instead, he chose to stand firm and face the impending assault. Two of his brigades were routed, and running toward the primary defensive line, intermixed with the attacking Confederates. As a result, the main Union force held its fire for fear of killing friendly troops, allowing the Confederate assault column to penetrate the Union center. Federal reinforcements finally stabilized the position, but Wagner's controversial course of action drew significant criticism and questioning. As a result of the debacle, Wagner asked to be relieved of duty, citing concerns for his wife's health. Wagner was returned to Indiana to await orders. He briefly served in St. Louis, Missouri, toward the end of the war. He was mustered out of the service in August 1865.

== Postbellum career ==
Less than a year after the war ended, Wagner's wife died from her infirmities. He established a legal practice in Williamsport, Indiana, in 1866. He once again became president of the state Agricultural Society and was influential in helping publicize modern agricultural practices and procedures.

Wagner died unexpectedly in Indianapolis, Indiana. He was buried at Armstrong Cemetery in Green Hill, Indiana, not far from the farm where he was raised.

== See also ==
- List of American Civil War generals (Union)
- List of Ohio's American Civil War generals
- Ohio in the American Civil War
