= Battle of Franklin =

Battle of the American Civil War

- Part of the Franklin–Nashville campaign of the American Civil War
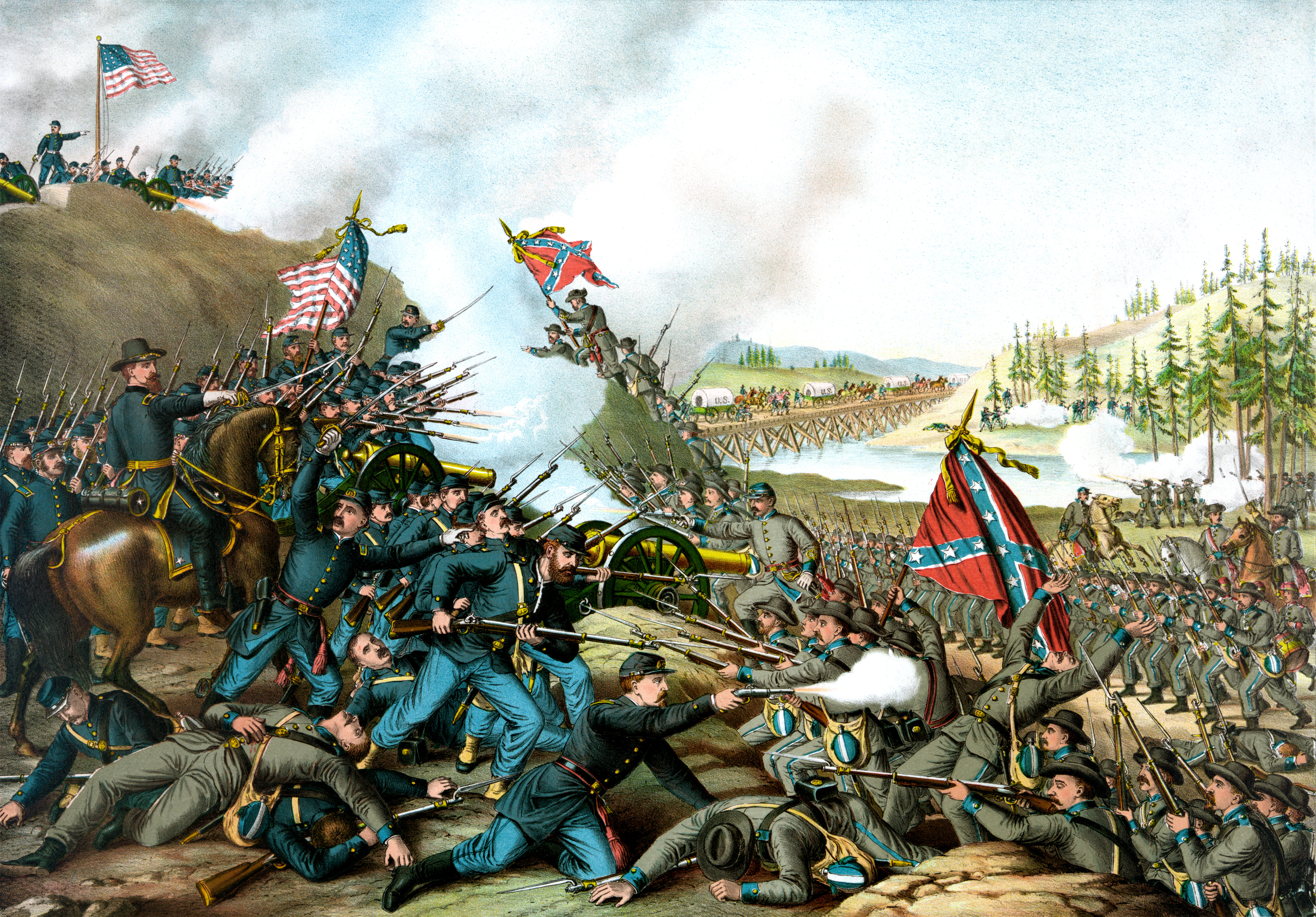
- Battle of Franklin, by Kurz and Allison (1891)
Date	November 30, 1864
Location	Franklin, Tennessee 35.9174°N 86.8733°W
Result	Union victory

Belligerents
United States (Union)	Confederate States

Commanders and leaders
(United States) John Schofield (United States) David S. Stanley	(Confederate States of America) John Bell Hood

Units involved
Army of the Ohio	Army of Tennessee

Strength
27,000	27,000–31,000

Casualties and losses
2,326 (total: 189 killed, 1,033 wounded, 1,104 missing/captured)	Army of Tennessee casualties for month of November 1864: 4,500; Union Claim: 6,252 (1,750 killed, 3,800 wounded, 702 missing/captured)

The Battle of Franklin was fought on November 30, 1864, in Franklin, Tennessee, as part of the Franklin–Nashville Campaign of the American Civil War. It was one of the worst disasters of the war for the Confederate States Army. Confederate Lieutenant General John Bell Hood's Army of Tennessee conducted numerous frontal assaults against fortified positions occupied by the Union's Army of the Ohio under Major General John Schofield and was unable to prevent Schofield from executing a planned, orderly withdrawal to Nashville.

The Confederate assault of six infantry divisions containing eighteen brigades with 100 regiments numbering almost 20,000 men, sometimes called the "Pickett's Charge of the West", resulted in devastating losses to the men and the leadership of the Army of Tennessee — fourteen Confederate generals (six killed, seven wounded, and one captured) and 55 regimental commanders were casualties. With the Confederates controlling the field following Union withdrawal, Hood claimed victory despite the failure of his initial plan to prevent Schofield's unification with Major General George H. Thomas' Army of the Cumberland, and went in hot pursuit and laid siege to the larger Union army at Nashville, precipitating the major battle that took place there subsequently. Following defeat in that engagement, the Army of Tennessee retreated with barely half the men with which it had begun the short offensive, and was effectively destroyed as a fighting force for the remainder of the war.

The 1864 Battle of Franklin was the second military action in the vicinity; a battle fought there on April 10, 1863, was a minor action associated with a reconnaissance in force by Confederate cavalry under Major General Earl Van Dorn.

== Background ==
=== Military situation ===
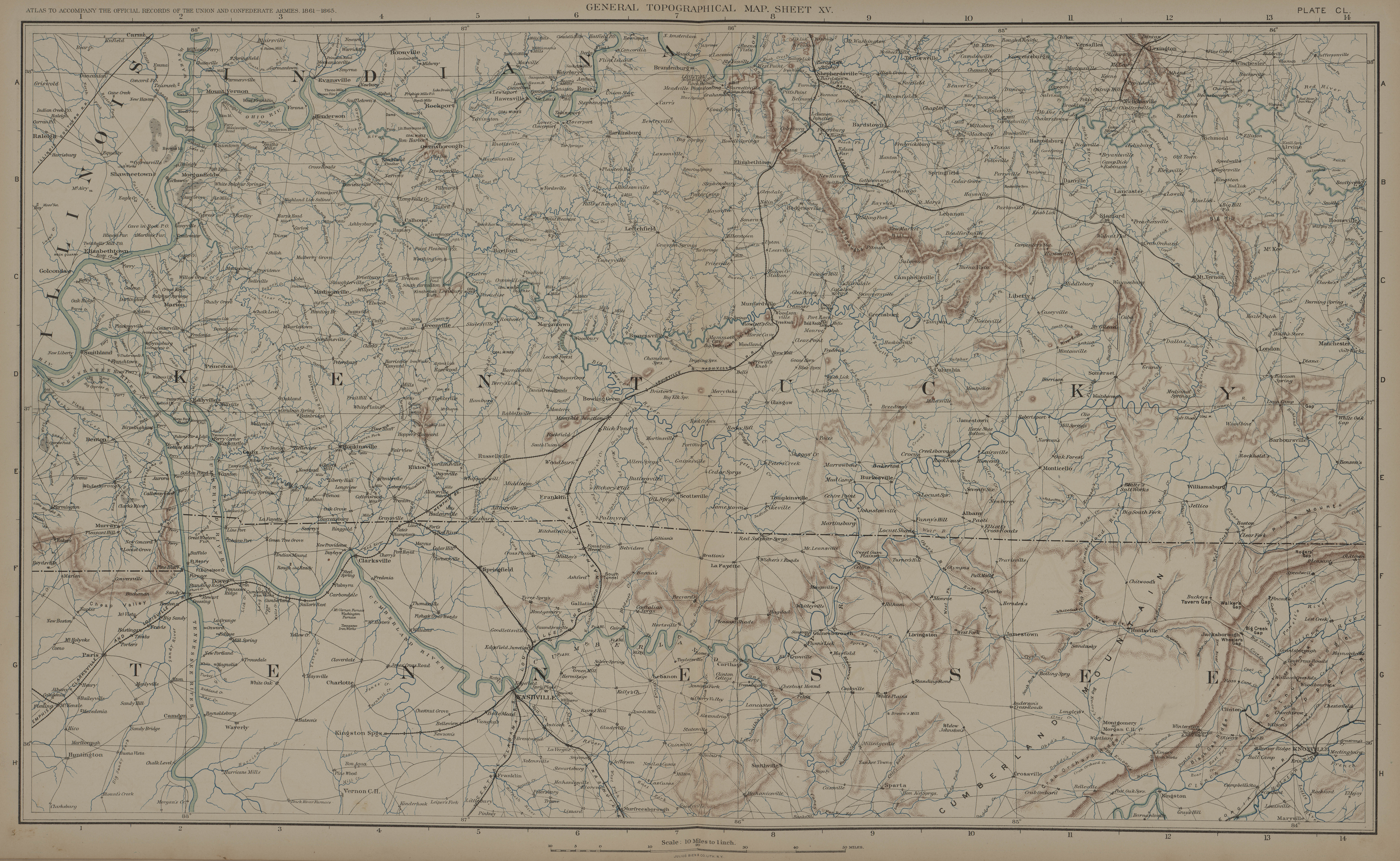
Kentucky-Northern Tennessee, 1864

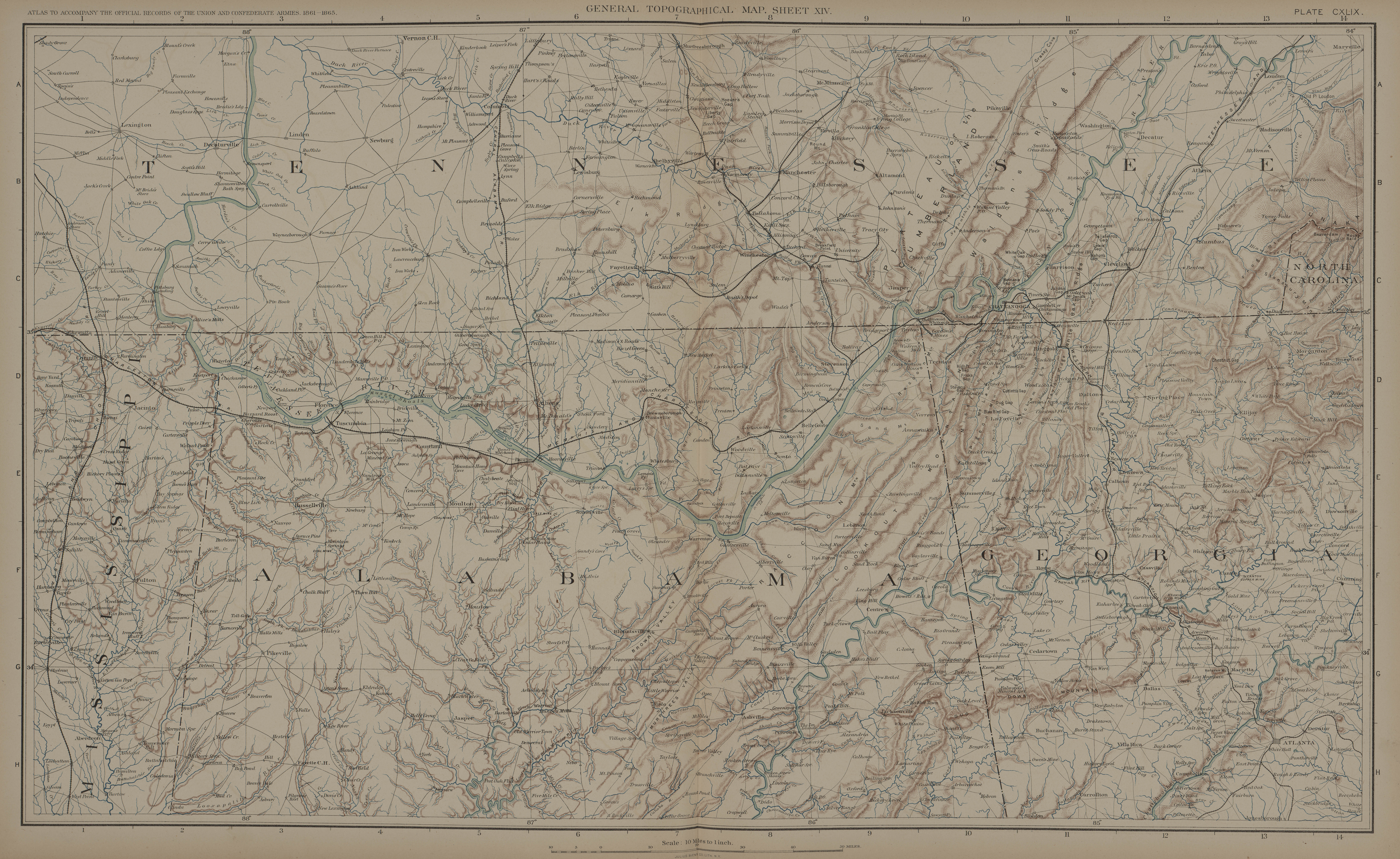
Southern Tennessee-Alabama, 1864

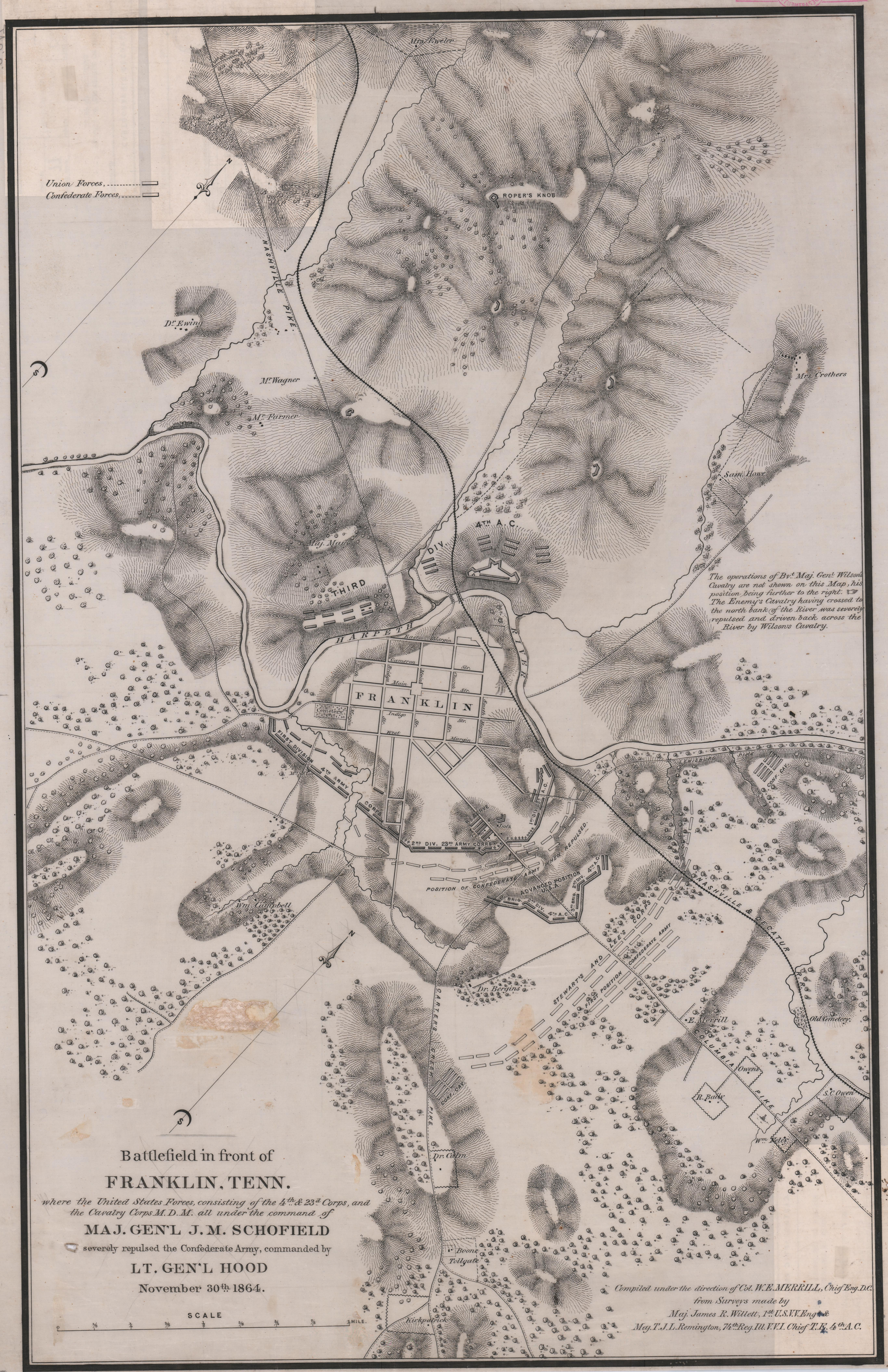
Map of Franklin, 1864

Map of the Franklin–Nashville Campaign Confederate Union

Following his defeat in the Atlanta campaign, Hood had hoped to lure Major General William T. Sherman into battle by disrupting his railroad supply line from Chattanooga to Atlanta. After a brief period in which he pursued Hood, Sherman decided instead to cut his main army off from these lines and "live off the land" in his famed March to the Sea from Atlanta to Savannah. By doing so, he would avoid having to defend hundreds of miles of supply lines against constant raids, through which he predicted he would lose "a thousand men monthly and gain no result" against Hood's army.

Sherman's march left the aggressive Hood unoccupied, and his Army of Tennessee had several options in attacking Sherman or falling upon his rear lines. The task of defending Tennessee and the rearguard against Hood fell to Major General George H. Thomas, commander of the Army of the Cumberland. The principal forces available in Middle Tennessee were IV Corps of the Army of the Cumberland, commanded by Major General David S. Stanley, and XXIII Corps of the Army of the Ohio, commanded by Major General John Schofield, with a total strength of about 30,000. Another 30,000 troops under Thomas's command were in or moving toward Nashville.

Rather than trying to chase Sherman in Georgia, Hood decided that he would attempt a major offensive northward, even though his invading force of 39,000 would be outnumbered by the 60,000 Union troops in Tennessee. He would move north into Tennessee and try to defeat portions of Thomas's army in detail before they could concentrate, seize the important manufacturing and supply center of Nashville, and continue north into Kentucky, possibly as far as the Ohio River.

Hood even expected to pick up 20,000 recruits from Tennessee and Kentucky in his path of victory and then join up with Robert E. Lee's army in Virginia, a plan that historian James M. McPherson describes as "scripted in never-never land." Hood had recovered from but was affected by a couple of serious physical battle wounds to a leg and arm, which caused him pain and limited his mobility. Hood spent the first three weeks of November quietly supplying the Army of Tennessee in northern Alabama in preparation for his offensive.

=== Road to Franklin, November 21–29 ===
The Army of Tennessee marched north from Florence, Alabama, on November 21, and indeed managed to surprise the Union forces, the two halves of which were 75 miles (121 km) apart at Pulaski, Tennessee and at Nashville. With a series of fast marches that covered 70 miles (110 km) in three days, Hood tried to maneuver between the two armies to destroy each in detail. But Union general Schofield, commanding Stanley's IV Corps as well as his own XXIII Corps, reacted correctly with a rapid retreat from Pulaski to Columbia, which held an important bridge over the Duck River on the turnpike north. Despite suffering losses from Maj. Gen. Nathan Bedford Forrest's cavalry along the way, the Federals were able to reach Columbia and erect fortifications just hours before the Confederates arrived on November 24. From November 24 to 29, Schofield managed to block Hood at this crossing, and the "Battle of Columbia" was a series of mostly bloodless skirmishes and artillery bombardments while both sides re-gathered their armies.

On November 28, Thomas directed Schofield to begin preparations for a withdrawal north to Franklin. He was incorrectly expecting that Major General A. J. Smith's XVI Corps arrival from Missouri was imminent and he wanted the combined force to defend against Hood on the line of the Harpeth River at Franklin instead of the Duck River at Columbia. Meanwhile, early on the morning of November 29, Hood sent Benjamin F. Cheatham's and Alexander P. Stewart's corps north on a flanking march. They crossed the Duck River at Davis's Ford east of Columbia, while two divisions of Stephen D. Lee's corps and most of the army's artillery remained on the southern bank to deceive Schofield into thinking a general assault was planned against Columbia.

Now that Hood had outflanked him by noon on November 29, Schofield's army was in critical danger. His command was split at that time between his supply wagons and artillery and part of the IV Corps, which he had sent to Spring Hill nearly ten miles north of Columbia, and the rest of the IV and XXIII corps marching from Columbia to join them. In the Battle of Spring Hill that afternoon and night, Hood had a golden opportunity to intercept and destroy the Union troops and their supply wagons, as his forces had already reached the turnpike separating the Union forces by nightfall. However, because of a series of command failures along with Hood's premature confidence that he had trapped Schofield, the Confederates failed to stop or even inflict much damage to the Union forces during the night.

Schofield was criticized by the Lost Cause myth for moving slowly in reaction to Hood and being only lucky to escape, but his subordinates defended his reaction as a careful balance between the safety of his army and his mission to delay Hood from striking Nashville before Thomas had amassed all his forces. (Note: Per Cox: "It is necessary to keep this phase of the situation very clearly in mind; for Schofield's critics have made the delibcratencss of his retreat a favorite point for attack; overlooking the pressure upon him to make it still more so, and the indisputable fact that, had he hastened his movement by a single day, Thomas's concentration would have been balked by Hood's intercepting the railway trains that were bringing Steedman's two divisions from Chattanooga to Nashville.") Through decisive leadership and good luck, both the Union infantry and supply train managed to pass Spring Hill unscathed by dawn on November 29, and soon occupied the town of Franklin 12 miles (19 km) to the north. That morning, Hood was surprised and furious to discover Schofield's unexpected escape. Hood ordered his army to resume its pursuit north to Franklin.

=== Union defensive plans ===
Schofield's advance guard arrived in Franklin at about 4:30 a.m. on November 30, after a forced march north from Spring Hill. Brigadier General Jacob Cox, commander of the 3rd Division, temporarily assumed command of the XXIII Corps and immediately began preparing strong defensive positions around the deteriorated entrenchments originally constructed for a previous engagement in 1863.

Schofield decided to defend at Franklin with his back to the river because he had no pontoon bridges available that would enable his men to cross the river. The bridges had been left behind in his retreat from Columbia because they lacked wagons to transport them, and pontoons requested from Thomas in Nashville had not arrived. Schofield needed time to repair the permanent bridges spanning the river—a burned wagon bridge and an intact railroad bridge. He ordered his engineers to rebuild the wagon bridge and to lay planking over the undamaged railroad bridge to enable it to carry wagons and troops. His supply train parked in the side streets to keep the main pike open, while wagons continued to cross the river, first via a ford next to the burned-out pike bridge, and later in the afternoon by the two makeshift bridges. By the beginning of the assault, nearly all the supply wagons were across the Harpeth and on the road to Nashville.

By noon, the Union works were ready. The line, based on the prior year's fortifications, formed an approximate semicircle around the town from northwest to southeast. The other half of the circle was the Harpeth River. Counterclockwise from the northwest were the divisions of Kimball (IV Corps), Ruger (XXIII Corps), and Reilly (XXIII Corps). There was a gap in the line where the Columbia Pike (present day U.S. Route 31) entered the outskirts of the town, left open to allow passage of the wagons. About 200 feet (61 m) behind this gap, a 150-yard "retrenchment" line was constructed of dirt and rails, which was intended to be a barrier to traffic, not a full-fledged defensive earthwork. (The gap was also defended by the guns of Battery A, 1st Kentucky Artillery. The men of the 44th Missouri also extended the retrenchment line to the west along their front with hastily dug trenches.) The actual earthworks in the southern portion of the line were formidable. Attacking infantry would be confronted by a ditch about four feet wide and two to three feet deep, then a wall of earth and wooden fence rails four feet above normal ground level, and finally a trench three to four feet deep in which the defenders stood, aiming their weapons through narrow "head gaps" formed by logs. In the southeast portion of the line, Osage-orange shrubs formed an almost impenetrable abatis. Just behind the center of the line stood the Carter House, appropriated as Cox's headquarters. Just east of the pike was the Carter cotton gin building, around which a minor salient occurred in the Union earthworks. Schofield established his headquarters in the Alpheus Truett House, a half mile north of the Harpeth on the Nashville Pike, although he would spend most of his time during the battle in Fort Granger, built in 1863 as an artillery position northeast of the town.

Two Union brigades were positioned about a half mile forward of the main line. George D. Wagner's division (Note: Wagner's division was a mix of veterans and green troops who had been recruited six to eight weeks beforehnd. Following the cues of their veteran colleagues, they were well aware of the vulnerability of their position south of the main line.) had been the last to arrive from Spring Hill, and after briefly stopping at Winstead Hill before Hood arrived, he ordered his brigades under Cols. Emerson Opdycke, John Q. Lane, and Joseph Conrad (who had replaced Luther Bradley, wounded at Spring Hill) to stop halfway to the Union line and dig in as best they could on the flat ground. Stanley had earlier ordered Wagner to hold Winstead Hill with two brigades and relieve Opdycke (who had been the tail end of the rear guard) until dark unless he was pressed, and it is possible that Wagner somehow translated these orders into the notion that he was supposed to hold a line south of the main position with all his division. Opdycke considered Wagner's order to be ridiculous and had already been directed by Stanley to retire within the works; he marched his brigade through the Union line and into a reserve position behind the gap through which the Columbia Pike passed. At 12:00, when the other U.S. forces had finished their fortifications, these two brigades had not even started digging in. (Note: A few days after his ill-considered position was overrun in the Confederate advance, Wagner was relieved of command at his own request. Jacobson has termed his decision to stand there "reckless discretion.") Conrad's and Lane's brigades had few entrenching tools and used mainly bayonets, cups, and their hands.

Wood's division of IV Corps and all of Wilson's cavalry were posted north of the Harpeth to watch for any flanking attempt. Schofield planned to withdraw his infantry across the river by 18:00. if Hood had not arrived by then. As Hood approached, Schofield initially assumed the Confederates were demonstrating as they had at Columbia, planning to cross the Harpeth and turn the Union position. He did not suspect that Hood would be rash enough to attack the strong defensive line.

=== Hood's arrival and plan ===
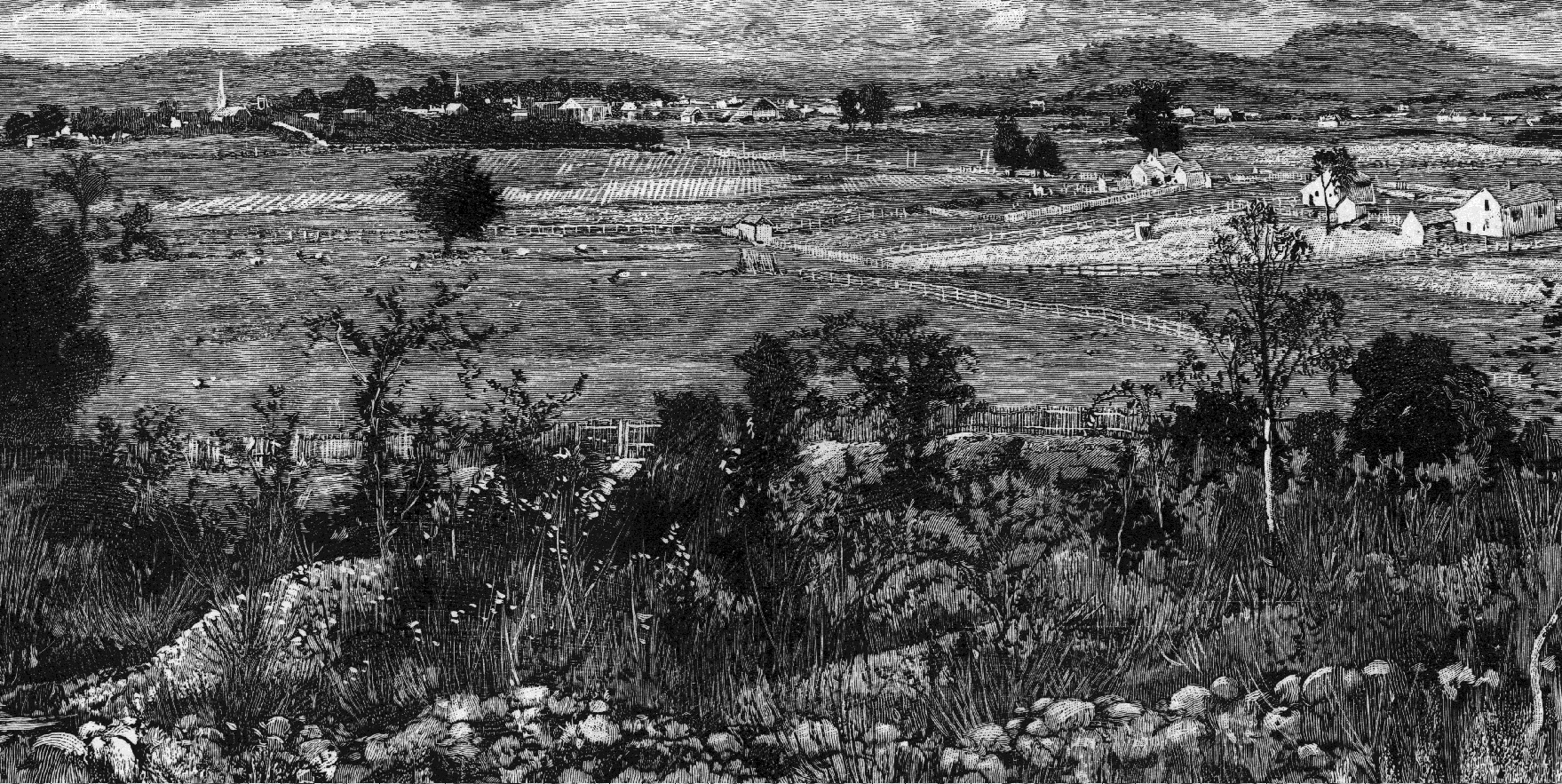
View north from Hood's headquarters on Winstead Hill (engraving from Battles and Leaders of the Civil War)

Hood's army began to arrive on Winstead Hill, two miles (3 km) south of Franklin, around 13:00 Hood ordered a frontal assault in the dwindling afternoon light—sunset would be at 16:34 that day—against the Union force, a decision that caused dismay among his top generals. Forrest argued unsuccessfully that if he were given a division of infantry to accompany his cavalry, he could flank Schofield out of his position "within an hour." Frank Cheatham told Hood, "I do not like the looks of this fight; the enemy has an excellent position and is well fortified." But Hood countered that he would rather fight a Federal force that had had only a few hours to build defenses, instead of Nashville where "they have been strengthening themselves for three years." Patrick Cleburne observed the enemy fortifications as being formidable, but he told the commanding general that he would either take the enemy's works or fall in the attempt. (Note: The Lost Cause myth has ushed the narrative that Cleburne was resigned to his fate, but recently discovered papers show that according to a lot of his peers, Cleburne felt that he and Cheatham were responsible for the failure at Spring Hill, and that Cleburne was aiming to redeem himself and his division.) He later remarked to Brigadier General Daniel C. Govan, "Well, Govan, if we are to die, let us die like men."

I hereupon decided, before the enemy would be able to reach his stronghold at Nashville, to make that same afternoon another and final effort to overtake and rout him, and drive him in the Big Harpeth river at Franklin, since I could no longer hope to get between him and Nashville, by reason of the short distance from Franklin to that city, and the advantage which the Federals enjoyed in the possession of the direct road.

— Lt. Gen. John Bell Hood, Advance and Retreat

Some popular histories assert that Hood acted rashly in a fit of rage, resentful that the Federal army had slipped past his troops the night before at Spring Hill and that he wanted to discipline his army by ordering them to assault against strong odds. Recent scholarship discounts this as unlikely, as it was not only militarily foolish, but Hood was observed to be determined, not angry, by the time he arrived in Franklin. (Note: For examples of the popular view promoting Hood's anger and resentment, see Sword, McPherson & Gottlieb, and Nevin.) His move was very much in keeping with the behavior of Lee and his subordinates in the Army of Northern Virginia in that aggressive action frequently gains one the initiative in combat.

Regardless of Hood's personal motivations, his specific objective was to try to crush Schofield before he and his troops could escape to Nashville. He was concerned that if he attempted to turn Schofield by crossing the Harpeth and getting between him and Nashville, the maneuver would be time-consuming and the open terrain of the area would reveal his movements prematurely, causing Schofield to simply withdraw again. The Confederates began moving forward at 16:00, with Cheatham's corps on the left of the assault and Stewart's on the right. Bate's division, on the left, was delayed in reaching its starting point as it marched around Winstead Hill, a movement that delayed the start of the entire army. Hood divided Forrest's cavalry—Chalmer's division on the far left, beyond Bate, and Buford and Jackson with Forrest, covering Stewart and facing the fords on the Harpeth. Lee's corps, and almost all of the army's artillery, had not yet arrived from Columbia. Hood's attacking force, about 19–20,000 men, was arguably understrength for the mission he assigned—traversing two miles (3 km) of open ground with only two batteries of artillery support and then assaulting prepared fortifications.

== Opposing forces ==
=== Union ===
Principal Union commanders
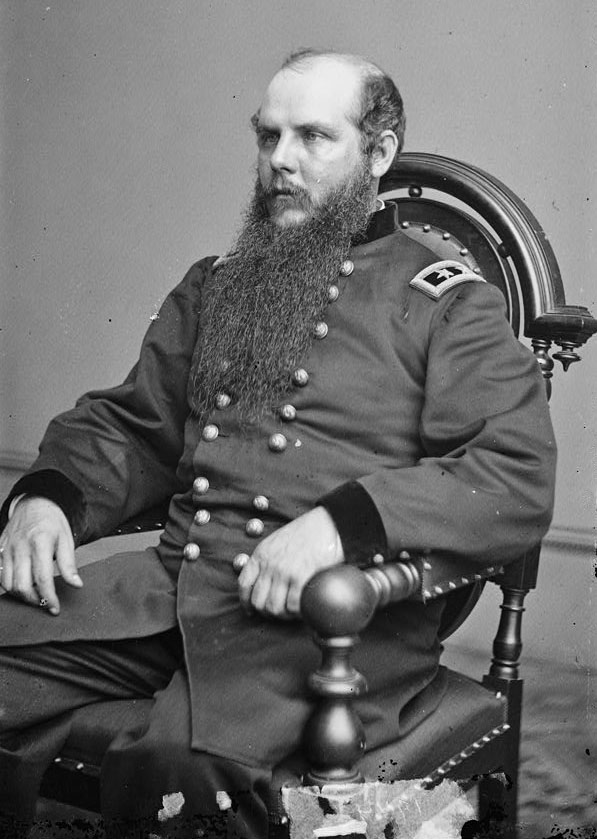
Maj. Gen.
John Schofield

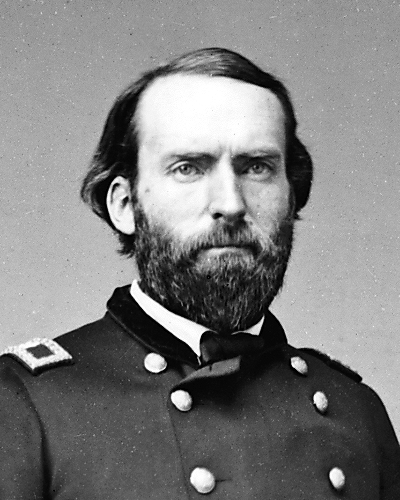
Maj. Gen.
David S. Stanley

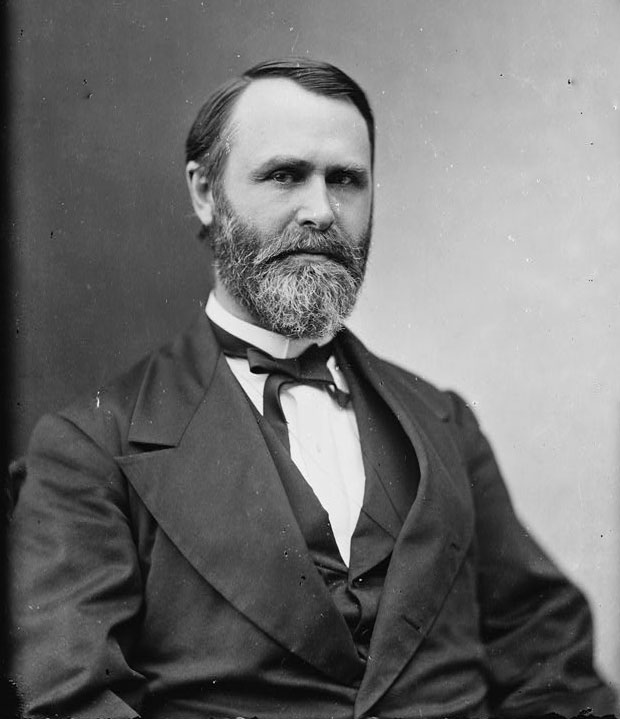
Brig. Gen.
Jacob D. Cox

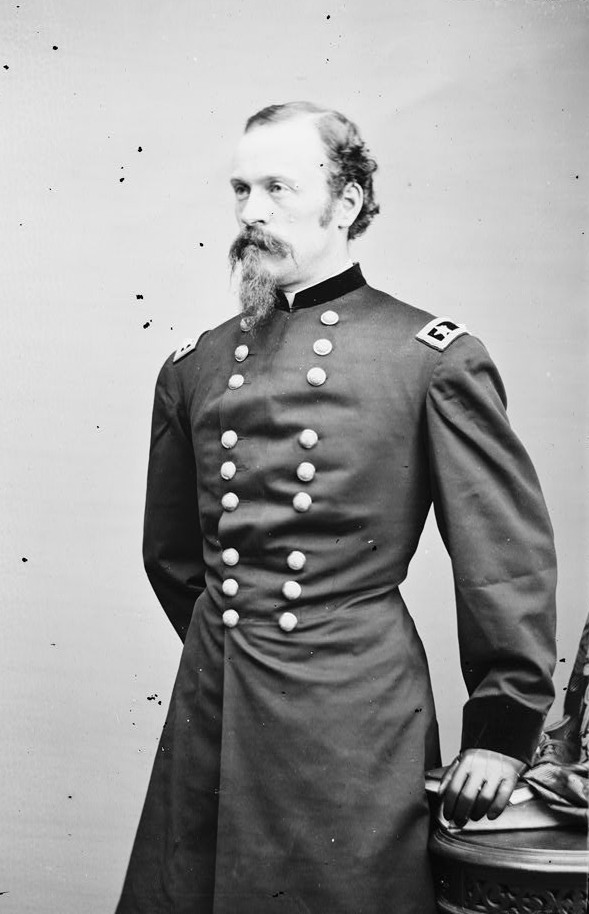
Maj. Gen.
James H. Wilson

Maj. Gen. John M. Schofield, commander of the Army of the Ohio, led a force of about 27,000 consisting of:

- IV Corps, commanded by Maj. Gen. David S. Stanley, with divisions commanded by Brig. Gens. Nathan Kimball, George D. Wagner, and Thomas J. Wood.
- XXIII Corps, normally commanded by Schofield, but temporarily commanded at Franklin by Brig. Gen. Jacob D. Cox, with divisions commanded by Brig. Gens. Thomas H. Ruger and James W. Reilly.
- Cavalry Corps, commanded by Maj. Gen. James H. Wilson, with divisions commanded by Brig. Gen. Edward M. McCook, Edward Hatch, Richard W. Johnson, and Joseph F. Knipe. (Note: Although Schofield was the commander of the Army of the Ohio through 1865, historians of the campaign do not always use this designation for the combination of corps assembled against Hood, referring in some cases only to the "Federal Army.")

=== Confederate ===
Principal Confederate commanders
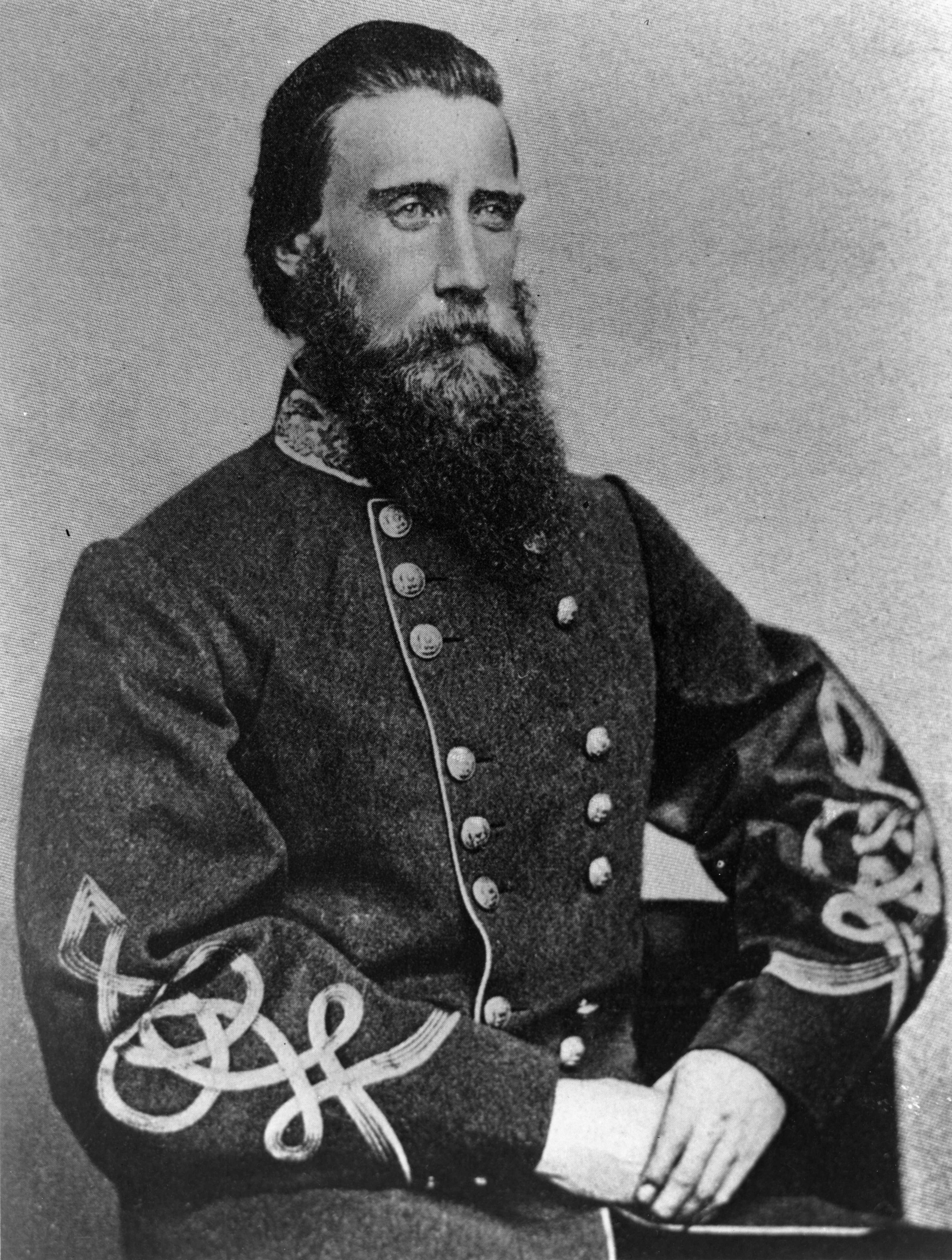
Lt. Gen.
John Bell Hood

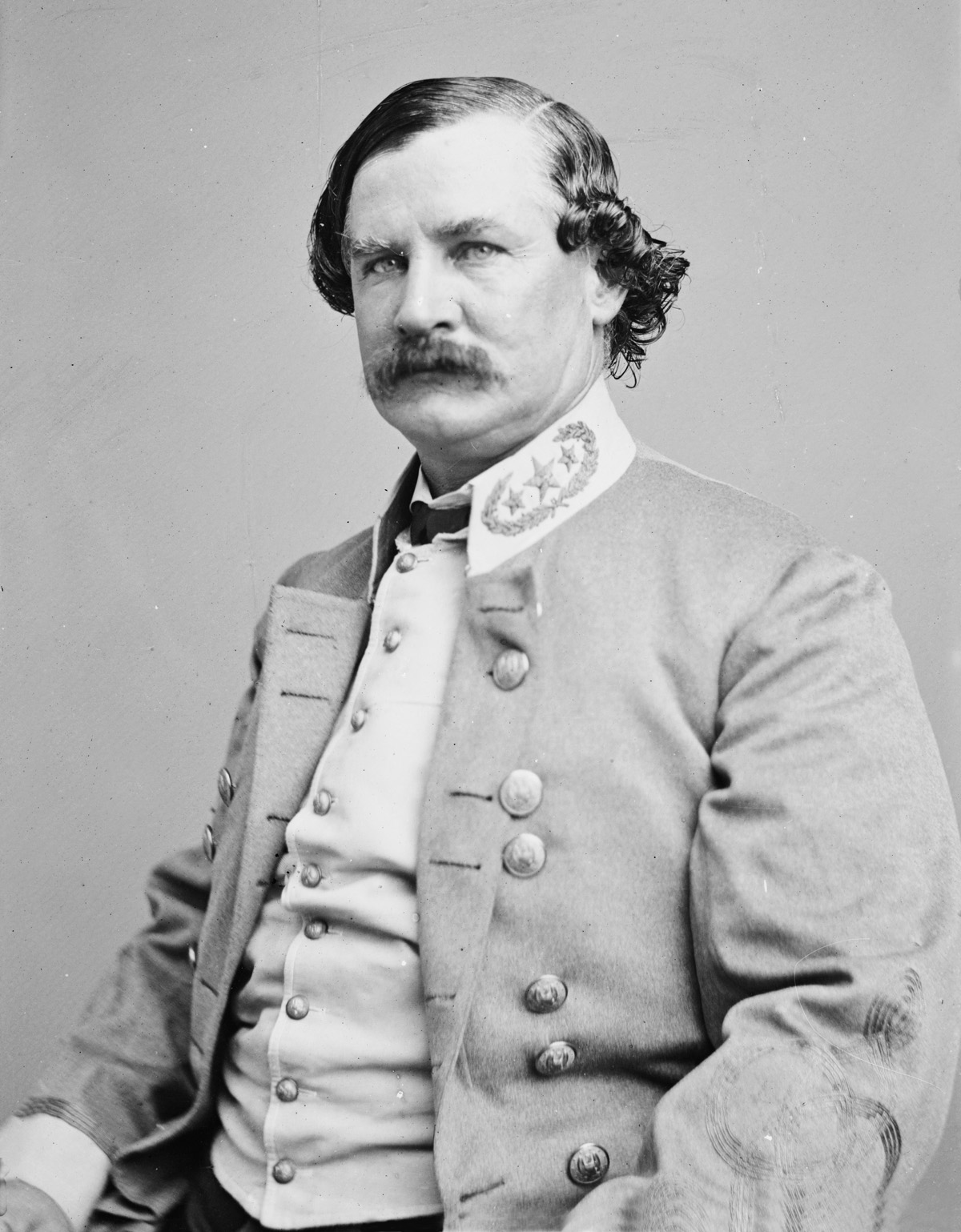
Maj. Gen.
Benjamin F. Cheatham

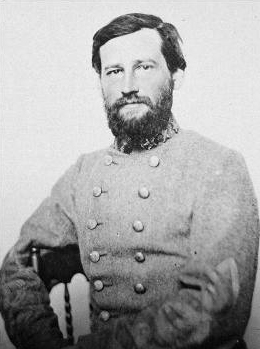
Lt. Gen.
Stephen D. Lee

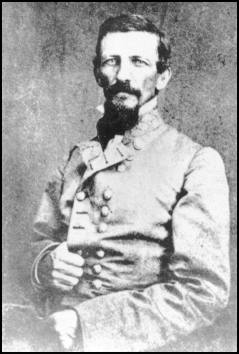
Lt. Gen.
Alexander P. Stewart

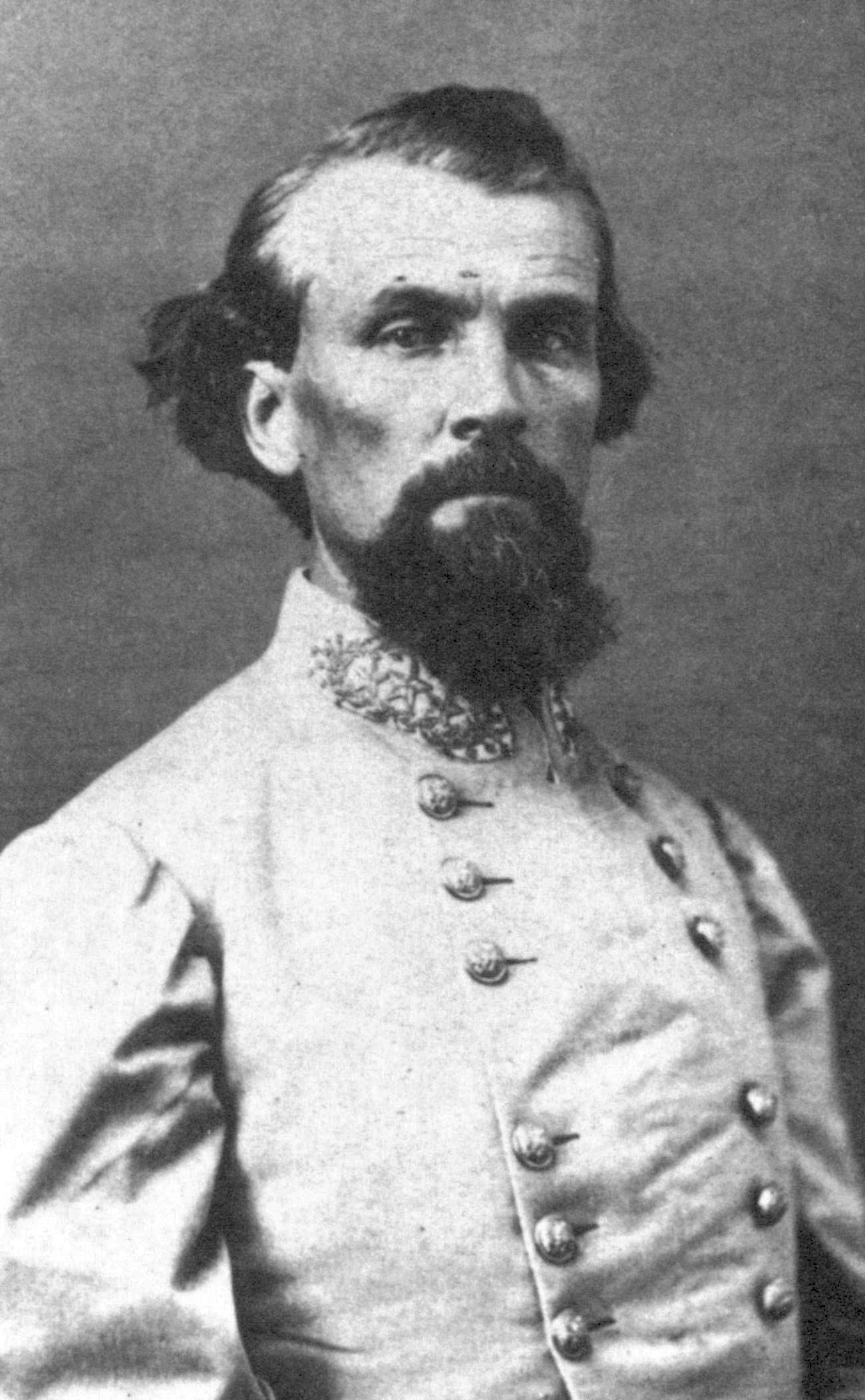
Maj. Gen.
Nathan Bedford Forrest

Lt. Gen. John Bell Hood's (Note: At the start of the Atlanta Campaign, Hood was appointed a temporary "full" general, but this appointment was never confirmed by the Confederate Congress and was later rescinded.) Army of Tennessee, at 39,000 men, constituted the second-largest remaining army of the Confederacy, ranking in strength only after Gen. Robert E. Lee's Army of Northern Virginia. The army consisted of the corps of:

- Maj. Gen. Benjamin F. Cheatham, with divisions commanded by Maj. Gens. Patrick R. Cleburne, John C. Brown, and William B. Bate.
- Lt. Gen. Stephen D. Lee, with divisions commanded by Maj. Gens. Edward "Allegheny" Johnson, Carter L. Stevenson, and Henry D. Clayton. (Only Johnson's division played an active role at Franklin.)
- Lt. Gen. Alexander P. Stewart, with divisions commanded by Maj. Gen. William W. Loring, Samuel G. French, and Edward C. Walthall.
- Cavalry forces under Maj. Gen. Nathan Bedford Forrest, with divisions commanded by Brig. Gen. James R. Chalmers, Abraham Buford, and William H. Jackson.

At Franklin, about 27,000 Confederates were engaged, primarily from the corps of Cheatham, Stewart, and Forrest, and Johnson's division of Lee's corps.

== Battle ==
=== Initial contact ===
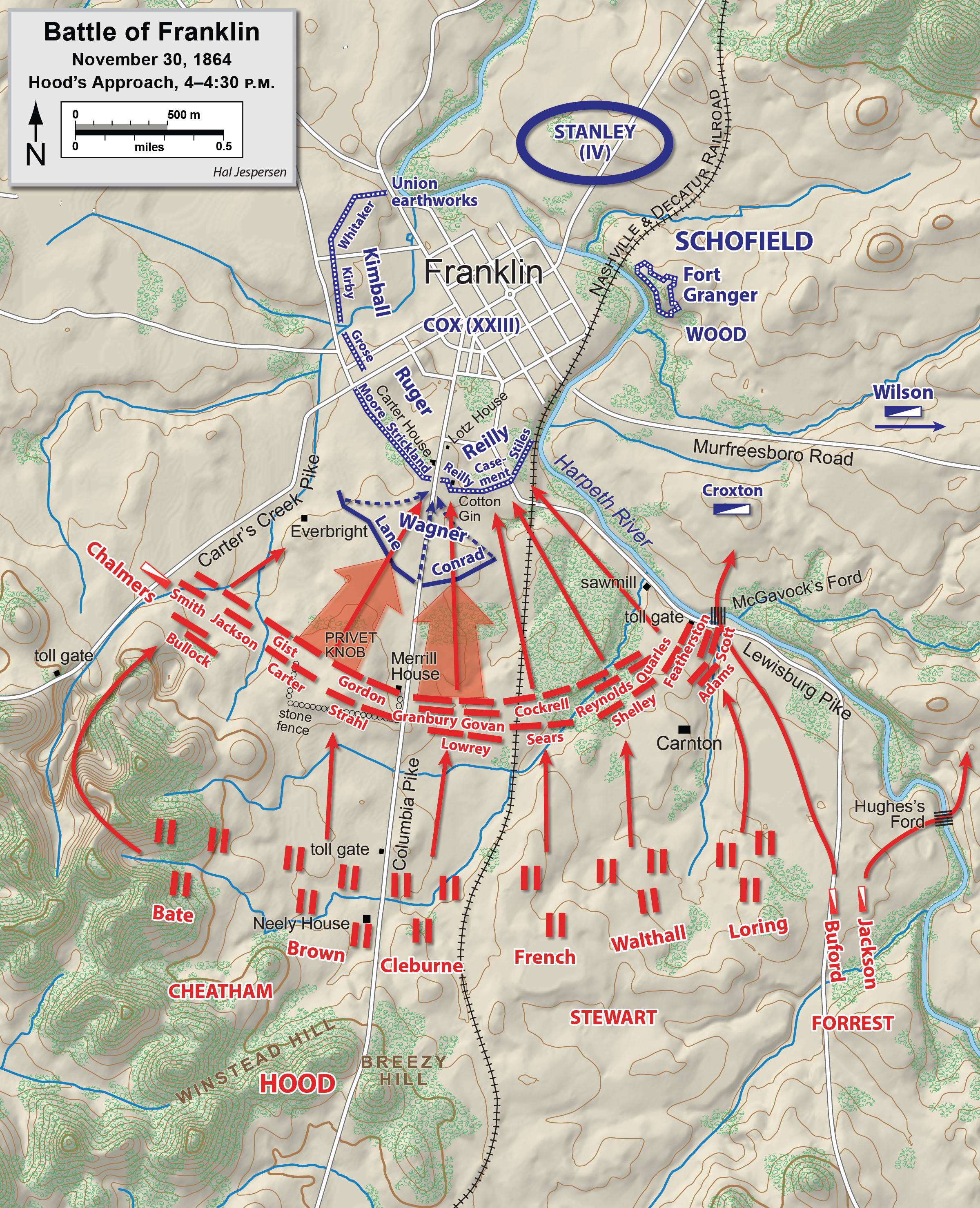
Hood's approach and attacks against Wagner's advanced line Confederate Union

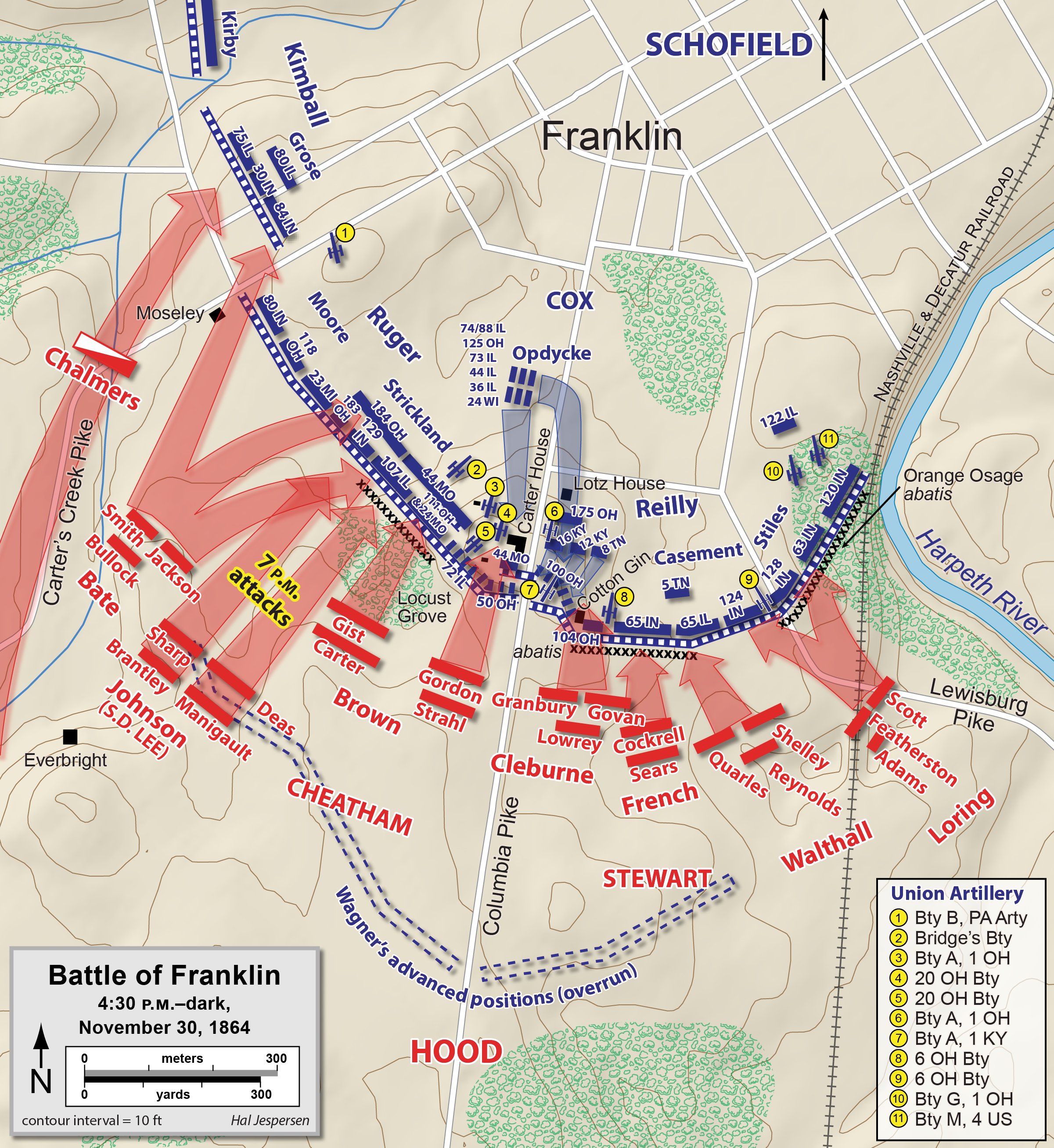
Confederate attacks and Opdycke's counterattack, 16:30–19:00.

Hood's attack initially enveloped the 3,000 men in two brigades under Lane and Conrad, which attempted to stand their ground behind inadequate fieldworks and without anchored flanks, but quickly collapsed under the pressure. As Wagner exhorted his men to stand fast, they let loose a single strong volley of rifle fire, and a two-gun section of Battery G, 1st Ohio Light Artillery, fired canister, but then many of the veteran soldiers of the two brigades stampeded back on the Columbia Pike to the main breastworks, while some untried replacements were reluctant to move under fire and were captured. Nearly 700 of Wagner's men were taken prisoner. The fleeing troops were closely pursued by the Confederates, and a cry was repeated along the line, "Go into the works with them." The pursued and pursuers were so intermingled that defenders in the breastworks had to hold their fire to avoid hitting their comrades.

=== Breakthrough and repulse in the Federal center ===
The Union's momentary inability to defend the opening in the works caused a weak spot in its line at the Columbia Pike from the Carter House to the cotton gin. The Confederate divisions of Cleburne, Brown, and French converged on this front and a number of their troops broke through the now not-so-solid Federal defenses on either side. The 100th Ohio Infantry, of Reilly's brigade, was driven back from its position to the east of the pike and Colonel Silas A. Strickland's brigade (Ruger's division) was forced to withdraw back to the Carter House. The left wing of the 72nd Illinois Infantry was swept away and rallied on the 183rd Ohio Infantry, in reserve at the retrenchment, which prompted the remainder of the 72nd to withdraw back to that line. In a matter of minutes, the Confederates had penetrated 50 yards deep into the center of the Federal line.

As the Confederates poured men into the breach, reserve regiments on both sides of the pike, the 44th Missouri and 100th Ohio stood their ground, but were in danger of being overwhelmed. At this time, Emerson Opdycke's brigade was in reserve, positioned in columns of regiments facing north in a meadow about 200 yards north of the Carter House. Opdycke quickly repositioned his veterans into line of battle, straddling the road, and they were confronted by masses of fleeing Union soldiers, pursued by Confederates. Opdycke ordered his brigade forward to the works. At the same time, his corps commander, David Stanley, arrived on the scene. He later wrote, "I saw Opdycke near the center of his line urging his men forward. I gave the Colonel no orders as I saw him engaged in doing the very thing to save us, to get possession of our line again." As he rode forward, Stanley had his horse shot out from under him and a bullet passed through the back of his neck, putting him temporarily out of action.

At the same time as Opdycke's counterattack west of the pike, the reserve elements of Reilly's division (the 12th Kentucky Infantry, 16th Kentucky Infantry, and 175th Ohio Infantry Regiment (Note: The 175th Ohio was a green regiment that had only been formed in October 1864.)) had stood their ground and served as a rally line for survivors of Strickland's and Wagner's divisions. Together they sealed the breach. Hand-to-hand fighting around the Carter House and the pike was furious and desperate, employing such weapons as bayonets, rifle butts, entrenching tools, axes, and picks. When they ran out of cannonballs, they began to use pine cones from the surrounding trees.

For years afterward, the ferocity of the combat at extremely close quarters made the battle stand out in many of the veterans' memories. The historian, Jonathan Steplyk noted that the involvement of the field officers alongside their troops in the "frenzied brawl" showed the desperation with which they fought as regimental officers were normally expected to lead and inspire their men instead of getting directly involved. Many a field-grade officer in the U.S. forces actually used their swords as weapons that day. After having his horse shot out from under him and taking a bullet, Arthur MacArthur ran through a Confederate major who had just shot him in the chest. Opdycke riding his horse emptied his pistol at the Rebels and then dismounted to use it as club until it broke; grabbing a musket, he began clubbing the enemy with that. Steplyk writes that a reason the combat may have stood out so vividly for veterans was because the closeness was so exceptional; many of the Army of the Ohio and the Army of Tennessee had fought since Shiloh, but this combat was the first time they saw the bayonet and musket butt used with such abandon.

Firing continued around the Carter house and gardens for hours. Many in Brown's division were driven back to the Federal earthworks, where many were pinned down for the remainder of the evening, unable to either advance or flee. Each side fired through embrasures or over the top of the parapets at close range in an attempt to dislodge the other. Brown's division suffered significant losses, including Brown, who was wounded, and all four of his brigade commanders were casualties. Brown's brigade under Brig. Gen. George W. Gordon had angled to the right during the advance, joining Cleburne's division to the east of the pike. Their attack near the cotton gin was driven back from the breastworks and was then subjected to devastating cross fire from Reilly's brigade to their front and the brigade of Col. John S. Casement, on Reilly's right. Cleburne was killed in the attack and 14 of his brigade and regimental commanders were casualties.

That some Union troops were armed with Spencer and Henry repeating rifles added to the otherwise considerable advantages of the defenders. Near the Carter House, 350 men of the 12th Kentucky and 65th Illinois fired 16-shot, lever-action Henry rifles, the predecessors to the Winchester repeating rifle. These rifles were capable of at least 15 to 30 shots per minute, which gave these men several times more firepower than typical infantrymen with more common muzzle-loading rifle-muskets.

=== Repulse on the Federal left ===
While fighting raged at the center of the Union line, the Confederates of Stewart's corps also advanced against the Union left. Because the Harpeth River flowed in that area from southeast to northwest, the brigade found itself moving through a space getting progressively narrower, squeezing brigades together into a compressed front, delaying their movements and reducing their unit cohesion. Walthall's division was pressured so much from the right that it temporarily fell in front of Cleburne's advance. They were all subjected to fierce artillery fire not only from the main Union line, but also from the batteries across the river at Fort Granger. They also had significant difficulty pushing through the strong osage-orange abatis. Loring's division launched two attacks against the Union brigade of Col. Israel N. Stiles and both were repulsed with heavy losses. Artillery firing canister rounds directly down the railroad cut prevented any attempt to flank the Union position. Brig. Gen. John Adams attempted to rally his brigade by galloping his horse directly onto the earthworks. As he attempted to seize the flag of the 65th Illinois, he and his horse were both shot and killed. The brigade of Brig. Gen. Winfield S. Featherston began falling back under heavy fire when its division commander, Maj. Gen. William W. Loring, confronted them, shouting, "Great God. Do I command cowards?" He attempted to inspire his men by sitting on his horse in full view of the Federal lines for over a minute and emerged unharmed, but the brigade made no further progress.

Walthall's division, intermixed partially with Loring's division because of the confusion that resulted from the narrow space, struck Casement's and Reilly's brigades in multiple waves of brigade assaults—probably as many as six distinct attacks. All of these assaults were turned back with heavy losses. The brigade of Brig. Gen. William A. Quarles was able to push through the abatis and reached the Federal earthworks, where it was pinned down by murderous crossfire. Quarles was wounded in the left arm and at the end of the battle the highest-ranking officer standing in his brigade was a captain.

=== Failures on the Confederate left and center ===
Maj. Gen. William B. Bate's division had a long distance to march to reach its assigned objective on the Union right and when he gave the final order to attack it was almost dark. First contact with the enemy came around the Everbright Mansion, the home of Rebecca Bostick, and the Confederates pushed aside Union sharpshooters and swept past the house. However, Bate's left flank was not being protected as he expected by Chalmers's cavalry division, and they received enfilade fire. To protect the flank, Bate ordered the Florida Brigade, temporarily commanded by Col. Robert Bullock, to move from its reserve position to his left flank. This not only delayed the advance, but provided only a single line to attack the Union fortifications, leaving no reserve. Chalmers's troopers had actually engaged the Federal right by this time (the brigades of Col. Isaac M. Kirby and Brig. Gen. Walter C. Whitaker of Kimball's division), fighting dismounted, but Bate was unaware of it because the two forces were separated by rolling ground and orchards. Neither Bate nor Chalmers made any progress and they withdrew.

Hood, who remained at his headquarters on Winstead Hill, was still convinced that he could pierce the Federal line. At about 19:00, he deployed the only division of Stephen D. Lee's corps that had arrived, commanded by Maj. Gen. Edward "Allegheny" Johnson, to assist Cheatham's effort. They moved north on the west side of the Columbia Turnpike and passed around Privet Knob, Cheatham's headquarters, but were unfamiliar with the terrain in the dark and Cheatham told Lee he had no staff officer left who could guide them. Both Bate and Cheatham warned Lee not to fire indiscriminately against the Federal works because Confederates were pinned down there on the outside. Johnson's men lost their unit alignments in the dark and had significant difficulties attacking the works just to the west of the Carter House. They were repulsed after a single assault with heavy losses.

=== Cavalry actions ===
In addition to Chalmers's actions in the west, across the river to the east Confederate cavalry commander Forrest attempted to turn the Union left. His two divisions on Stewart's right (Brig. Gens. Abraham Buford II and William H. Jackson) engaged some Federal cavalry pickets and pushed them back. They crossed the Harpeth at Hughes Ford, about 3 miles (4.8 km) upstream from Franklin. When Union cavalry commander Brig. Gen. James H. Wilson learned at 15:00 that Forrest was crossing the river, he ordered his division under Brig. Gen. Edward Hatch to move south from his position on the Brentwood Turnpike and attack Forrest from the front. He ordered Brig. Gen. John T. Croxton's brigade to move against Forrest's flank and held Col. Thomas J. Harrison's brigade in reserve. The dismounted cavalrymen of Hatch's division charged the Confederate cavalrymen, also dismounted, and drove them back across the river. Some of Croxton's men were armed with seven-shot Spencer carbines, which had a devastating effect on the Confederate line. Wilson was proud of his men's accomplishment because this was the first time that Forrest had been defeated by a smaller force in a standup fight during the war.

== Aftermath ==
The annals of war may long be searched for a parallel to the desperate valor of the charge of the Army of Tennessee at Franklin, a charge which has been called "the greatest drama in American history." Perhaps its only rival for macabre distinction would be Pickett's Charge at Gettysburg. A comparison of the two may be of interest. Pickett's total loss at Gettysburg was 1,354 [this is not an accurate number, the number of casualties during Pickett's Charge actually exceeded 6500 in less than an hour (Note: Horn understates the losses of Pickett's Charge. Pickett's division alone suffered 2,655 casualties (498 killed, 643 wounded, 833 wounded and captured, and 681 captured, unwounded) and total Confederate losses during the three-division attack were 6,555. Thus, total casualties were somewhat comparable, although the loss in senior officers at Franklin was far worse—more so than Horn's 1941 description states.)]; at Franklin the Army of Tennessee lost over 6,000 dead and wounded. Pickett's charge was made after a volcanic artillery preparation of two hours had battered the defending line. Hood's army charged without any preparation. Pickett's charge was across an open space of perhaps a mile. The advance at Franklin was for two miles in the open, in full view of the enemy's works, and exposed to their fire. The defenders at Gettysburg were protected only by a stone wall. Schofield's men at Franklin had carefully constructed works, with trench and parapet. Pickett's charge was totally repulsed. The charge of Brown and Cleburne penetrated deep into the breastworks, to part of which they clung until the enemy retired. Pickett, once repelled, retired from the field. The Army of Tennessee renewed their charge, time after time. Pickett survived his charge unscathed. Cleburne was killed, and eleven other general officers were killed, wounded or captured. "Pickett's charge at Gettysburg" has come to be a synonym for unflinching courage in the raw. The slaughter-pen at Franklin even more deserves the gory honor.

— Stanley F. Horn, The Army of Tennessee

Following the failure of Johnson's assault, Hood decided to end offensive actions for the evening and began to plan for a resumed series of attacks in the morning. Schofield ordered his infantry to cross the river, starting at 23:00, despite objections from Cox that withdrawal was no longer necessary and that Hood was weakened and should be counter-attacked. Schofield had received orders from Thomas to evacuate earlier that day—before Hood's attack began—and he was happy to take advantage of them despite the changed circumstances. Although there was a period in which the Union army was vulnerable, outside its works and straddling the river, Hood did not attempt to take advantage of it during the night. The Union army began entering the breastworks at Nashville at noon on December 1, with Hood's damaged army in pursuit.

The damaged Confederate force was left in control of Franklin, but its enemy had escaped again. Although he had briefly come close to breaking through in the vicinity of the Columbia Turnpike, Hood was unable to destroy Schofield or prevent his withdrawal to link up with Thomas in Nashville. And his unsuccessful result came with a frightful cost. The Union commanding general claimed that the Confederates suffered 6,252 casualties, including 1,750 killed and 3,800 wounded, but this is not corroborated by Confederate reports. An estimated 2,000 others suffered less serious wounds and returned to duty before the Battle of Nashville.

More importantly, the military leadership in the West was decimated, including the loss of perhaps the best division commander of either side, Patrick Cleburne, who was killed in action. Fourteen Confederate generals (six killed, seven wounded, and one captured) and 55 regimental commanders were casualties. Five generals killed in action at Franklin were Cleburne, John Adams, Hiram B. Granbury, States Rights Gist, and Otho F. Strahl. A sixth general, John C. Carter, was mortally wounded and died later on December 10. The wounded generals were John C. Brown, Francis M. Cockrell, Zachariah C. Deas, Arthur M. Manigault, Thomas M. Scott, and Jacob H. Sharp. One general, Brig. Gen. George W. Gordon, was captured. (Note: Jacobson presents a full list of all of the officers who were casualties during the battle.) Also among the dead was Tod Carter, the middle child of the Carter family. Having enlisted in the Confederate army three years earlier, Carter had returned to his hometown for the first time since then, only to be wounded in battle just a few hundred yards away from his own house. He was found by his family after the battle, and died early in the next day.

Historian Andrew Bledsoe writes that the "wastage" of the officer corps "irreparably harmed [Hood's] army's morale, disrupted its command structure, and deprived it of talented and experienced commanders."" He further cites the timing of the attack, just before twilight, as a key factor combined with the fact that most officers were mounted to preserve their command and control in the fading light, a "result of logical, and terrible, deliberation".

Union losses were reported as only 189 killed, 1,033 wounded, and 1,104 missing. It is possible that the number of casualties was under-reported by Schofield because of the confusion during his army's hasty nighttime evacuation of Franklin. (Note: Current unpublished research by Carter House historian David Fraley has identified Union killed at Franklin to be in excess of 600 and perhaps as many as 800. However, this list may include men who had fought at Franklin and died in captivity or in the Sultana explosion in April 1865.) The Union wounded were left behind in Franklin. Many of the prisoners, including all captured wounded and medical personnel, were recovered on December 18 when Union forces re-entered Franklin in pursuit of Hood.

The Army of Tennessee was badly damaged at Franklin. Nevertheless, rather than retreat and risk the army dissolving through desertions, Hood advanced his 26,500 man force against the Union army now combined under Thomas, firmly entrenched at Nashville which numbered more than 60,000. Hood and his department commander Gen. P.G.T. Beauregard requested reinforcements, but none were available. Strongly outnumbered and exposed to the elements, Hood was attacked by Thomas on December 15–16 at the Battle of Nashville, defeated decisively and pursued aggressively, retreating to Mississippi with just under 20,000 men. The Army of Tennessee never fought again as an effective force and Hood's career was ruined.

Perhaps surprisingly, some Confederate soldiers claimed that Franklin was a victory. James Lanning of the 25th Alabama Infantry wrote in his diary, “victory is ours but very dearly bought.” Confederate artilleryman William Ritter believed, “the charge was a brilliant one and was successful, as part of the enemy’s line was captured.” Joseph Boyce of the 1st Missouri Infantry acknowledged that many men considered Franklin a victory for the Confederate army since it held the battlefield at the end of the fighting. However, Boyce, who was wounded at Franklin, also noted “two such victories will wipe out any army.”

Hood's continued pursuit of Schofield after suffering defeat at Franklin and his refusal to withdraw before the battle of Nashville caused Schofield to remark "I doubt if any soldiers in the world ever needed more cumulative evidence to convince them that they were beaten."

In his Pulitzer Prize-winning book Battle Cry of Freedom, James M. McPherson wrote, "Having proved even to Hood's satisfaction that they could assault breastworks, the Army of Tennessee had shattered itself beyond the possibility of ever doing so again. David J. Eicher wrote that Hood "had in effect mortally wounded his army at Franklin."

=== Battlefield today ===
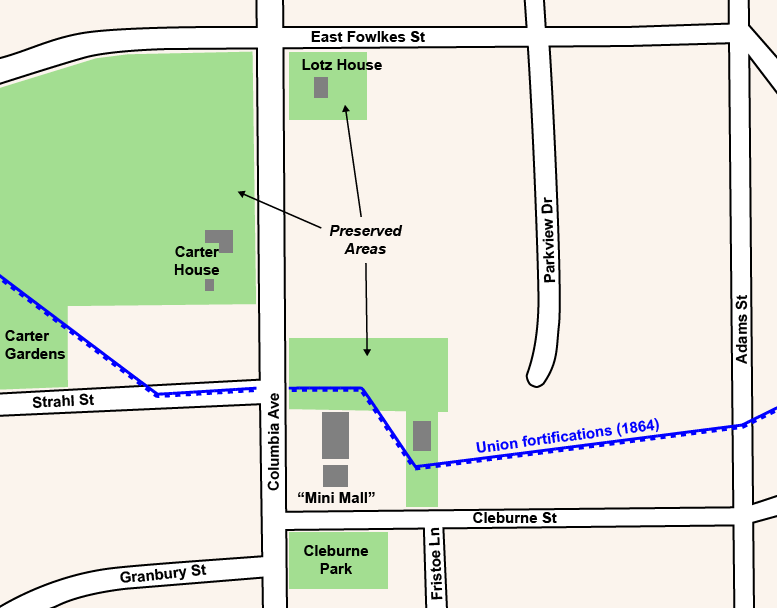
Preserved areas of the Franklin battlefield around the Union defensive line

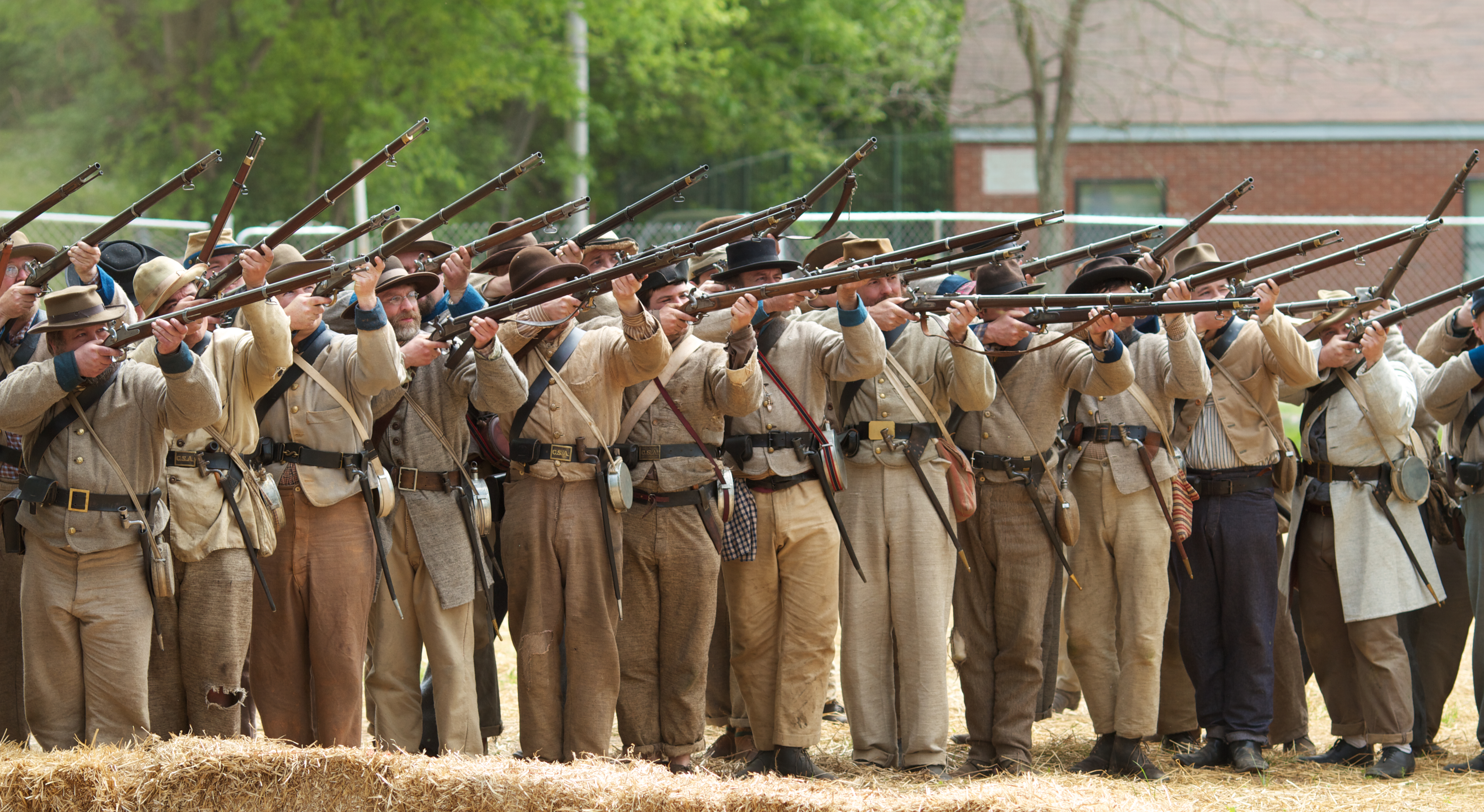
2010 Civil War reenactment, Carter House

The Carter House, which stands today and is open to visitors, was located at the center of the Union position. The site covers about 15 acres (61,000 m^{2}). The house and outbuildings still show hundreds of bullet holes. The Carnton Plantation, home to the McGavock family during the battle, also still stands and is likewise open to the public. The Carnton Plantation home was one of 44 Franklin homes serving as a hospital, often with 30 wounded in each small room of the house. Confederate soldiers of Stewart's Corps swept past Carnton toward the left wing of the Union army and the house and outbuildings were converted into the largest field hospital present after the battle. Adjacent to Carnton is the McGavock Confederate Cemetery, where 1,481 Southern soldiers killed in the battle are buried. Adjacent to the 48 acres (19 ha) surrounding Carnton is another 110 acres (45 ha) of battlefield, formerly the Franklin Country Club golf course, which is currently being converted to a city park.

Much of the rest of the Franklin battlefield has been lost to commercial development. The spot where Gen. Cleburne fell, for instance, was covered until late 2005 by a Pizza Hut restaurant. City officials and historic-preservation groups have recently placed a new emphasis on saving what remains of the land over which the battle raged.

In 2006, 0.5 acres (0.20 ha) of land bordering the southwestern end of the Carter House property was acquired with help of the American Battlefield Trust and local organizations. This land was part of 2 acres (0.81 ha) that made up the Carter Family Garden, which during the battle saw tremendous fighting and was part of a brief Confederate breakthrough. After the purchase, a house, out-buildings, and a swimming pool were removed. During excavation of the original Federal entrenchments some human bones were found.

Starting in 2005, the area around the intersection of Columbia Ave. and Cleburne St. has seen a serious renewed effort to reclaim that area to be the heart of a future battlefield park. The location of the former Pizza Hut is now the home to Cleburne Park. The property where the Carter Cotton Gin was located during the battle was purchased in 2005. In 2008 the property behind this location and where the Federal line crossed Columbia Ave. was purchased and in May 2010 the property east of the Gin location and where part of the Gin may have stood was also purchased. All these locations have houses on them that will be either sold and moved or torn down. Preservation organizations plan to reconstruct both the Carter Cotton Gin and some of the Federal entrenchments.

On November 24, 2010, the State of Tennessee awarded a $960,000 enhancement grant from the Tennessee Department of Transportation to help purchase the property where the Domino's Pizza and mini-mart is located. A local preservation organization is also hoping to purchase 16 acres of land in two parcels: five acres located southwest of what is now a small park called the Collin's Farm located at the southeast corner of the Lewisburg Pike and the Nashville and Decatur Railroad that was preserved a few years ago; and 11 acres located near the corner of Lewisburg Pike and Carnton Lane. The American Battlefield Trust and its federal, state and local partners have acquired and preserved more than 180 acres (0.73 km^{2}) of the battlefield in more than a dozen different transactions since 1996

== In popular culture ==
In the book Gone with the Wind by Margaret Mitchell, the character Rhett Butler mentions that he fought at Franklin. In the film of the same name, Mrs Mead remarks to Mrs Meriwether that Rhett Butler was decorated by the Confederate Congress for his services at the Battle of Franklin.

== See also ==
- Armies in the American Civil War
- Franklin-Nashville campaign
- List of costliest American Civil War land battles
- Sherman's March
- Troop engagements of the American Civil War, 1864
