= 15th Ohio Infantry Regiment =

- Active: April 27, 1861 – August 31, 1861 (3 months); September 1861 – December 27, 1865 (3 years)
- Country: United States
- Allegiance: Union
- Branch: Union Army
- Type: Infantry
- Engagements: Skirmish at Bowman's Place; Battle of Shiloh; Siege of Corinth; Battle of Stones River; Tullahoma Campaign; Battle of Chickamauga; Siege of Chattanooga; Battle of Missionary Ridge; Atlanta campaign; Battle of Resaca; Battle of Kennesaw Mountain; Siege of Atlanta; Battle of Jonesboro; Second Battle of Franklin; Battle of Nashville; Battle of Bentonville

The 15th Ohio Infantry Regiment was an infantry regiment in the Union Army during the American Civil War.

== Service ==
=== Three-months regiment ===
The 15th Ohio Infantry Regiment was organized in Columbus, Ohio, on April 27, 1861, in response to President Lincoln's call for 75,000 volunteers and mustered into service on May 4, 1861. The regiment moved to Zanesville, Ohio on May 8 and then to western Virginia. It performed duty on the Baltimore & Ohio Railroad and operations in the vicinity of Philippi, Laurel Hill and Corrick's Ford from June 3 to July 16. They were involved in action at Bowman's Place on June 29. Then they were ordered back to Columbus and mustered out on August 27–31, 1861.

=== Three-years regiment ===
The 15th Ohio Infantry was reorganized at Mansfield, Ohio, in September 1861 and mustered in for three years service under the command of Colonel Moses R. Dickey.

The regiment was attached to McCook's Command, October to November 1861. 6th Brigade, Army of the Ohio, to December 1861. 6th Brigade, 2nd Division, Army of the Ohio, to September 1862. 6th Brigade, 2nd Division, I Corps, Army of the Ohio, to November 1862. 1st Brigade, 2nd Division, Right Wing, XIV Corps, Army of the Cumberland, to January 1863. 1st Brigade, 2nd Division, XX Corps, Army of the Cumberland, to October 1863. 1st Brigade, 3rd Division, IV Corps, to August 1865. Department of Texas to November 1865.

The 15th Ohio Infantry mustered out of service at San Antonio, Texas, on November 21, 1865, and returned to Columbus where its members were discharged on December 27, 1865.

=== Detailed service ===
==== 1861 ====
- Moved to Camp Dennison, Ohio, September 26, thence to Lexington, Ky., October 4.
- Duty at Camp Nevin, Ky., October 14-December 9, 1861.
- Occupation of Munfordville, Ky., December 10, 1861.
- Duty at Bacon Creek, Ky., until February 14, 1862.

==== 1862 ====
- Advance to Bowling Green, Ky., and Nashville, Tenn., February 14-March 2.
- March to Savannah, Tenn., March 16-April 6.
- Battle of Shiloh April 6–7.
- Advance on and siege of Corinth, Miss., April 29-May 30.
- March to Battle Creek, Ala., June 10-July 18, and duty there until August 20.
- March to Louisville, Ky., in pursuit of Bragg, August 20-September 26.
- Pursuit of Bragg into Kentucky October 1–15.
- March to Nashville, Tenn., October 16-November 7, and duty there until December 26.
- Advance on Murfreesboro, Tenn., December 26–30.
- Battle of Stones River(Murfreesboro) December 30–31, 1862 and January 1–3, 1863.

==== 1863 ====
- Duty at Murfreesboro until June.
- Reconnaissance from Murfreesboro March 6–7.
- Tullahoma Campaign June 22-July 7.
- Liberty Gap June 22–27.
- Occupation of middle Tennessee until August 16.
- Passage of the Cumberland Mountains and Tennessee River, and Chickamauga Campaign August 16-September 22.
- Battle of Chickamauga September 19–20.
- Siege of Chattanooga, Tenn., September 24-November 23.
- Chattanooga-Ringgold Campaign November 23–27.
- Orchard Knob November 23–24.
- Battle of Missionary Ridge November 25.
- Pursuit to Graysville November 26–27.
- March to relief of Knoxville, Tenn., November 28-December 8.
- Operations in eastern Tennessee until February 1864.

==== 1864 ====
- At Cleveland, Tenn., until April.
- Atlanta campaign May 1-September 8.
- Demonstrations on Rocky Face Ridge and Dalton May 8–13.
- Battle of Resaca May 14–15.
- Adairsville May 17.
- Near Kingston May 18–19.
- Battle of Cassville May 19–22.
- Advance on Dallas May 22–25.
- Operations on line of Pumpkin Vine Creek and battles about Dallas, New Hope Church and Allatoona Hills May 25-June 5.
- Pickett's Mills May 27.
- Operations about Marietta and against Kennesaw Mountain June 10-July 2.
- Pine Hill June 11–14.
- Lost Mountain June 15–17.
- Assault on Kennesaw Mountain June 27.
- Ruff's Station July 4.
- Chattahoochie River July 5–17.
- Peachtree Creek July 19–20.
- Siege of Atlanta July 22-August 25.
- Flank movement on Jonesboro August 25–30.
- Battle of Jonesboro August 31-September 1.
- Lovejoy's Station September 2–6.
- Operations against Hood in northern Georgia and northern Alabama September 29-November 3.
- Nashville Campaign November–December. Columbia, Duck River, November 24–27.
- Battle of Franklin November 30.
- Battle of Nashville December 15–16.
- Pursuit of Hood to the Tennessee River December 17–28.

==== 1865 ====
- Camp at Bird Springs, Ala., until March 1865.
- Operations in eastern Tennessee March 15-April 22.
- At Nashville, Tenn., until June.
- Moved to New Orleans, La., June 16, thence to Texas.
- Duty at Green Lake until August 10, and at San Antonio until November.
- Mustered out November 21, 1865.
- Reach Columbus, Ohio, December 25, and discharged from service December 27, 1865.

== Casualties ==
The regiment lost a total of 315 men during service; 7 officers and 172 enlisted men killed or mortally wounded, 1 officer and 135 enlisted men died of disease.

== Commanders ==
- Colonel Moses R. Dickey
- Colonel William Wallace - commanded at the battle of Shiloh as major
- Colonel Frank Askew - commanded at the battle of Chickamauga as lieutenant colonel
- Lieutenant Colonel John McClenahan
- Captain A. R. Z. Dawson - commanded at the battle of Stones River while Col Wallace was in command of the brigade

== Notable members ==
- Private Robert B. Brown, Company A - Medal of Honor recipient for action at the battle of Missionary Ridge
- Corporal William E. Richey, Company A - Medal of Honor recipient for action at the battle of Chickamauga

== See also ==
- Horn Brigade
- List of Ohio Civil War units
- Ohio in the Civil War
