= Horn Brigade =

Union infantry brigade

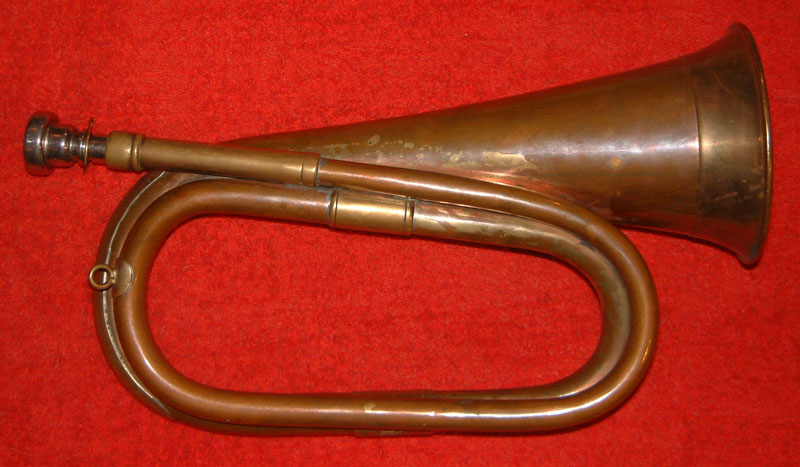
- Military bugle of the type the Horn Brigade was named for.
- Country: United States
- Allegiance: Union
- Branch: Union Army
- Type: Infantry
- Size: Five regiments: 15th Ohio Infantry; 49th Ohio Infantry; 32nd Indiana Infantry; 39th Indiana Infantry; 89th Illinois Infantry
- Nickname(s): Horn Brigade, Dutch Brigade, Iron Brigade of the Army of the Cumberland
- Engagements: American Civil War: Battle of Shiloh; Siege of Corinth; Battle of Stones River; Tullahoma Campaign; Battle of Liberty Gap; Battle of Missionary Ridge; Battle of Pickett's Mill; Battle of Franklin (1864); Battle of Nashville

Commanders
- Notable commanders: Brig. Gen. August Willich; Col. William Harvey Gibson

The Horn Brigade, also known as the Dutch Brigade, or the “Iron Brigade of the Army of the Cumberland,” was an infantry brigade in the Union Army of the Cumberland during the American Civil War. The brigade fought in the battles of Shiloh, Stones River, Liberty Gap, Chickamauga, Missionary Ridge, Atlanta, Franklin and Nashville.

== Nicknames ==
The brigade gained the sobriquet “Horn Brigade” while under the command of August Willich, a former Prussian Army officer who favored using bugle calls to signal movements. It was also known as the Dutch Brigade because of the ethnic makeup of the brigade (mainly the 32nd Indiana) and the brigade commander. Later, it also became known as the “Iron Brigade of the Army of the Cumberland” following its actions on September 20, 1863, when it drove back an entire Confederate division during the Battle of Chickamauga.

== History ==
The brigade that would later become known as the Horn Brigade originally consisted of the 15th Ohio, 49th Ohio, 32nd Indiana, 39th Indiana and Battery A, 1st Ohio Light Artillery. These units were later joined by the 89th Illinois, 25th Illinois, 35th Illinois, 68th Indiana, 8th Kansas, 15th Wisconsin, and 51st Indiana.

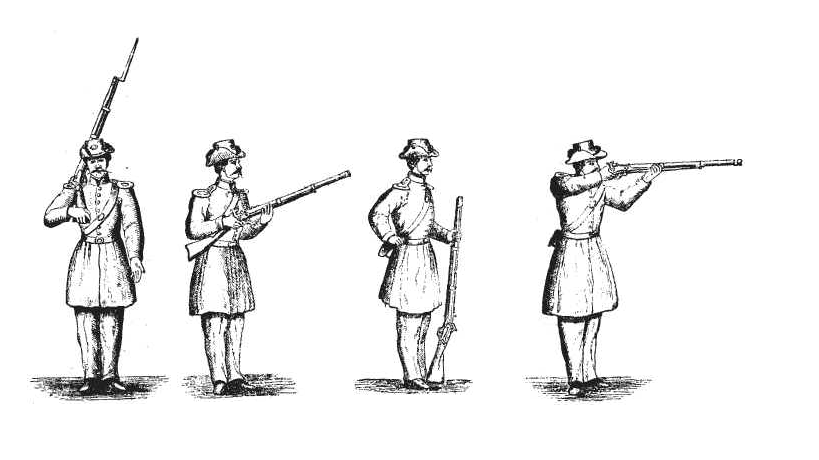
A portrayal of August Willich's system of "advance firing" utilized by the brigade at Liberty Gap and Chickamauga

The brigade was known by the following designations: Johnson's Brigade, McCook's Command, to November 1861. 6th Brigade, Army of the Ohio, to December 1861. 6th Brigade, 2nd Division, Army of the Ohio, to September 1862. 6th Brigade, 2nd Division, I Corps, Army of the Ohio, to November 1862. 1st Brigade, 2nd Division, Right Wing, XIV Corps, Army of the Cumberland, to January 1863. 1st Brigade, 2nd Division, XX Corps, Army of the Cumberland, to October 1863. 1st Brigade, 3rd Division, IV Corps, to August 1865.

The brigade was further distinguished by a tactic invented by August Willich known as “advance firing,” in which the regiments were organized into four ranks (rather than two), with one rank moving forward, firing, and reloading as it was replaced with the rank farthest to the rear. This tactic was used by the 49th Ohio to great effect at the Battle of Liberty Gap during the Tullahoma Campaign and again by the brigade at the Battle of Chickamauga.

At the Battle of Missionary Ridge, the brigade led the charge against the Confederate lines against orders and was among the first to reach the top of the ridge.

== Commanders ==
- Richard W. Johnson
- William H. Gibson
- August Willich
- Charles T. Hotchkiss
- Abel D. Streight
