= 39th Indiana Infantry Regiment =

39th Regiment Indiana Infantry
- Active: August 29, 1861 – October 15, 1863
- Country: United States
- Allegiance: Union
- Branch: Infantry and Mounted Infantry
- Engagements: Battle of Shiloh; Siege of Corinth; Battle of Stones River; Tullahoma Campaign; Battle of Liberty Gap; Battle of Chickamauga; Chattanooga campaign; Battle of Lookout Mountain; Battle of Missionary Ridge

The 39th Regiment Indiana Infantry was an infantry regiment that served in the Union Army during the American Civil War. The regiment fought at Shiloh, Corinth, and Stones River. In April 1863 the unit acquired horses and Spencer rifles and became mounted infantry, serving in the Tullahoma campaign and at Chickamauga. On October 15, 1863, the unit was renamed the 8th Indiana Cavalry Regiment.

== Service ==
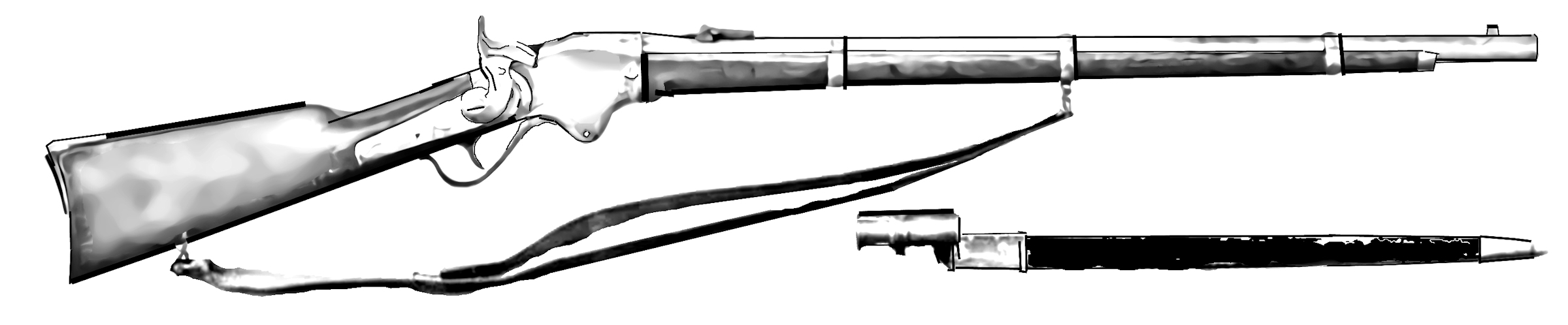
1862 Spencer Rifle with sling and bayonet

The 39th Indiana Infantry was organized at Indianapolis, Indiana and mustered in for a three-year enlistment on August 29, 1861.

The regiment was attached to Wood's Brigade, McCook's Command, Army of the Ohio, October–November 1861. 6th Brigade, Army of the Ohio, to December 1861. 6th Brigade, 2nd Division, Army of the Ohio, to September 1862. 6th Brigade, 2nd Division, I Corps, Army of the Ohio, to November 1862. 1st Brigade, 2nd Division, Right Wing, XIV Corps, Army of the Cumberland, to January 1863. 1st Brigade, 2nd Division, XX Corps, Army of the Cumberland. This was the Horn Brigade, also known as the Dutch Brigade, or the "Iron Brigade of the Army of the Cumberland." The 39th fought in this brigade (even after conversion to mounted infantry) in the battles of Shiloh, Stones River, Liberty Gap, Chickamauga, to October 1863.

The 39th Indiana Infantry ceased to exist on October 15, 1863, when its designation was changed to 8th Indiana Cavalry.

== Detailed service ==
Ordered to Kentucky and duty at Muldraugh's Hill, Camp Nevin, Nolin Creek, and Green River until February 1862. Action at Upton's Hill, Kentucky, October 12, 1861. March to Bowling Green, Kentucky, then to Nashville, Tenn., February 14-March 2, 1862. March to Savannah, Tennessee, March 16-April 6. Battle of Shiloh, April 6–7. Advance on and siege of Corinth, Mississippi, April 29-May 30. Pursuit to Booneville May 31-June 6. Buell's Campaign in northern Alabama and middle Tennessee June to August. March to Nashville, Tennessee, then to Louisville, Kentucky, in pursuit of Bragg August 20-September 26. Pursuit of Bragg into Kentucky October 1–15. Dog Walk October 8–9. March to Bowling Green, Kentucky, then to Nashville, Tenn., October 16-November 7, and duty there until December 26. Advance on Murfreesboro December 26–30. Battle of Stones River December 30–31, 1862 and January 1–3, 1863. Duty at Murfreesboro until April. Reconnaissance to Middleton March 6–7. Christiana and Middleton March 6. Expedition to Middleton May 21–22. Middleton May 22. Shelbyville Pike June 4. Operations on Eaglesville Pike June 4. Near Murfreesboro June 6. Tullahoma Campaign June 22-July 7. Christiana June 24. Battle of Liberty Gap June 24–27. Tullahoma June 29–30. Occupation of middle Tennessee until August 16. Passage of Cumberland Mountains and Tennessee River and Chickamauga Campaign August 16-September 22. Davis Ford, Chickamauga Creek, September 17. Battle of Chickamauga September 19–20. Missionary Ridge September 22. Shallow Ford Road September 22. Companies L and M joined the regiment in September 1863. Expedition to eastern Tennessee after Champ Ferguson September–October.

== Casualties ==
The regiment lost a total of 398 men during service; 9 officers and 138 enlisted men killed or mortally wounded, 1 officer and 250 enlisted men died of disease.

== Commanders ==
- Colonel Thomas J. Harrison
- Lieutenant Colonel Fielder A. Jones - commanded at the battle of Stones River

== See also ==
- List of Indiana Civil War regiments
- Indiana in the Civil War
- Horn Brigade
