= Battery A, 1st Ohio Light Artillery =

- Active: September 6, 1861 to July 31, 1865
- Country: United States
- Allegiance: Union
- Branch: Artillery
- Engagements: Battle of Shiloh; Siege of Corinth; Battle of Munfordville; Battle of Stones River; Tullahoma Campaign; Battle of Chickamauga; Siege of Chattanooga; Atlanta campaign Battle of Resaca; Battle of Kennesaw Mountain; Battle of Peachtree Creek; Siege of Atlanta; Battle of Jonesboro; Battle of Spring Hill; Second Battle of Franklin; Battle of Nashville

[[

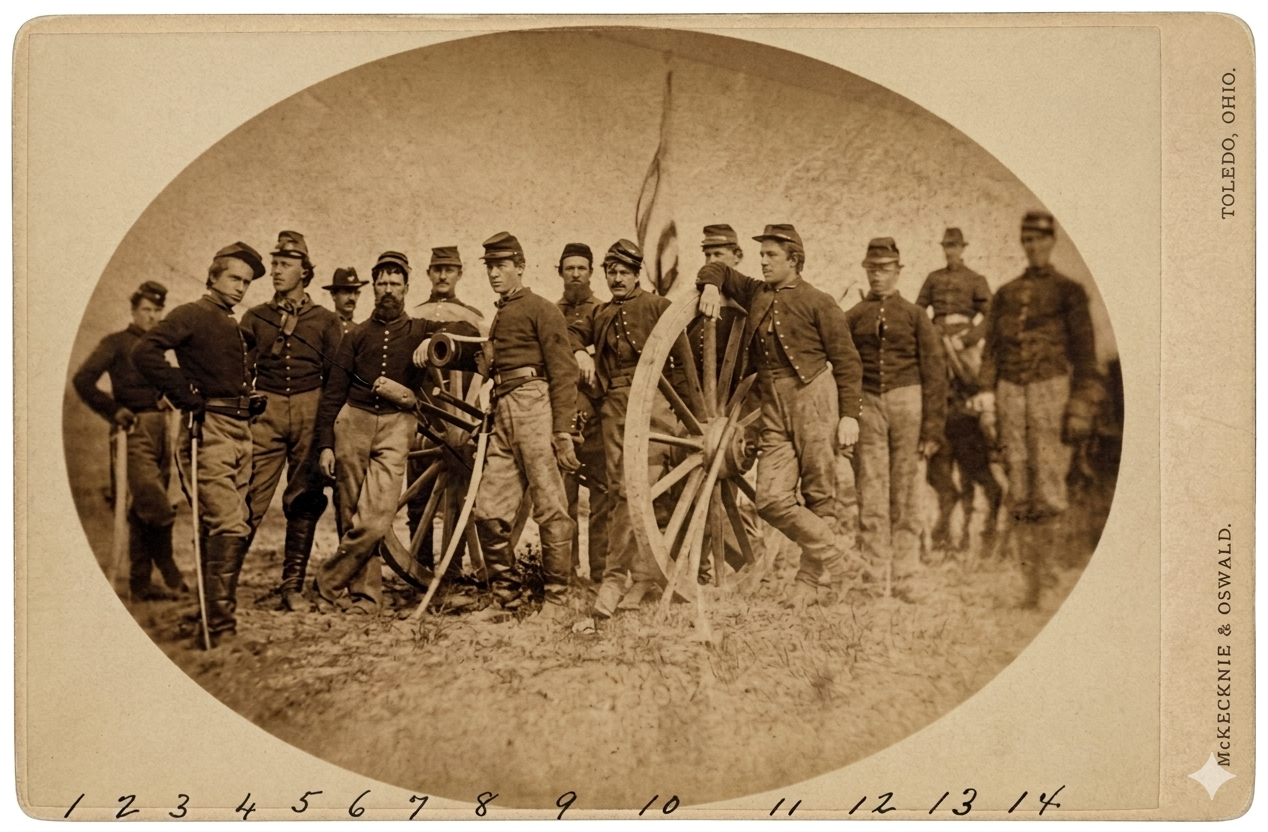
1st Ohio Light Artillery

|thumb|1st Ohio Light Artillery]]

Battery A, 1st Ohio Light Artillery was an artillery battery that served in the Union Army during the American Civil War.

== Service ==
The battery was organized at Camp Chase in Columbus, Ohio and mustered in for a three-year enlistment on September 6, 1861. The regiment was organized as early as 1860 under Ohio's militia laws, under Colonel James Barnett.

The battery was attached to Thomas' Command, Camp Nevin, Kentucky, to November 1861. Negley's Brigade, McCook's Command, at Nolin, Kentucky, to December 1861. 6th Brigade, 2nd Division, Army of the Ohio, to September 1862. Artillery, 2nd Division, I Corps, Army of the Ohio, to November 1862. 1st Brigade, 2nd Division, Right Wing, XIV Corps, Army of the Cumberland, to January 1863. Artillery, 2nd Division, XX Corps, Army of the Cumberland, to October 1863. 1st Division, Artillery Reserve, Department of the Cumberland, to March 1864. 2nd Division, Artillery Reserve, Department of the Cumberland, to April 1864. Artillery, 2nd Division, IV Corps, Department of the Cumberland, to July 1864. Artillery Brigade, IV Corps, to November 1864. District of Nashville, Tennessee, Department of the Cumberland, to March 1865. 4th Sub-District, Middle Tennessee, Department of the Cumberland, to July 1865.

Battery A, 1st Ohio Light Artillery mustered out of service at Cleveland, Ohio on July 31, 1865.

== Detailed service ==
Moved to Louisville, Ky., September 25, thence to Camp Nevin, Ky., October 22. Duty on Green River, Ky., December 10, 1861 to February 13, 1862. Advance on Bowling Green and Nashville, Tenn., February 13-March 3. March to Duck River March 16–21, and to Savannah, Tenn., March 31-April 6. Battle of Shiloh April 7. Advance on and siege of Corinth, Miss., April 29-May 30. March to Battle Creek, Ala., June 10-July 18, and duty there until August 20. March to Louisville, Ky., in pursuit of Bragg August 20-September 26. Siege of Munfordville, Ky., September 14–17. Pursuit of Bragg into Kentucky October 1–16. Lawrenceburg October 8. Dog Walk October 9. March to Nashville, Tenn., October 19-November 7, and duty there until December 26. Advance on Murfreesboro December 26–30. Battle of Stones River December 30–31, 1862 and January 1–3, 1863. At Murfreesboro until June. Reconnaissance from Murfreesboro March 6–7. Duck River Island April 26. Tullahoma Campaign June 23-July 7. Liberty Gap June 24–27. Manchester July 1. Occupation of middle Tennessee until August 16. Passage of Cumberland Mountains and Tennessee River and Chickamauga Campaign August 16-September 22. Battle of Chickamauga September 19–20. Siege of Chattanooga, September 24-October 18. Joined Gen. Spear at Sale Creek October 18. Action at Blythe's Ferry November 13. March through eastern Tennessee to Strawberry Plains November 28, 1863 to January 30, 1864. Duty in eastern Tennessee until April 1864. Atlanta Campaign May to September. Demonstration on Rocky Faced Ridge May 8–11. Buzzard's Roost Gap May 8–9. Battle of Resaca May 14–15. Adairsville May 17. Near Kingston May 18–19. Near Cassville May 19. Advance on Dallas May 22–25. Operations on line of Pumpkin Vine Creek and battles about Dallas, New Hope Church and Allatoona Hills May 25-June 5. Operations about Marietta and against Kennesaw Mountain June 10-July 2. Pine Hill June 11–14. Lost Mountain June 15–17. Assault on Kennesaw June 27. Ruff's Station, Smyrna Camp Ground, July 4. Chattahoochie River July 5–17. Buckhead, Nancy's Creek, July 18. Peachtree Creek July 19–20. Siege of Atlanta July 22-August 25. Flank movement on Jonesboro August 25–30. Battle of Jonesboro August 31-September 1. Lovejoy's Station September 2–6. Operations against Hood in northern Georgia and northern Alabama September 29-November 3. Nashville, Tenn., Campaign November–December. In front of Columbia, Duck River, November 24–27. Spring Hill November 29. Battle of Franklin November 30. Battle of Nashville December 15–16. Moved captured cannon off the field December 17. Duty at Nashville and Gallatin, Tenn., and in District of Middle Tennessee until July.

== Casualties ==
The battery lost a total of 48 men during service; 15 enlisted men killed or mortally wounded, 33 enlisted men died of disease.

== Commanders ==
- Captain Charles S. Cotter
- Captain Wilbur F. Goodspeed
- Lieutenant Edmund B. Belding - commanded at the Battle of Stones River
- Lieutenant Charles W. Scovill - commanded at the Battle of Nashville

== See also ==
- Horn Brigade
- List of Ohio Civil War units
- Ohio in the Civil War
