= 89th Illinois Infantry Regiment =

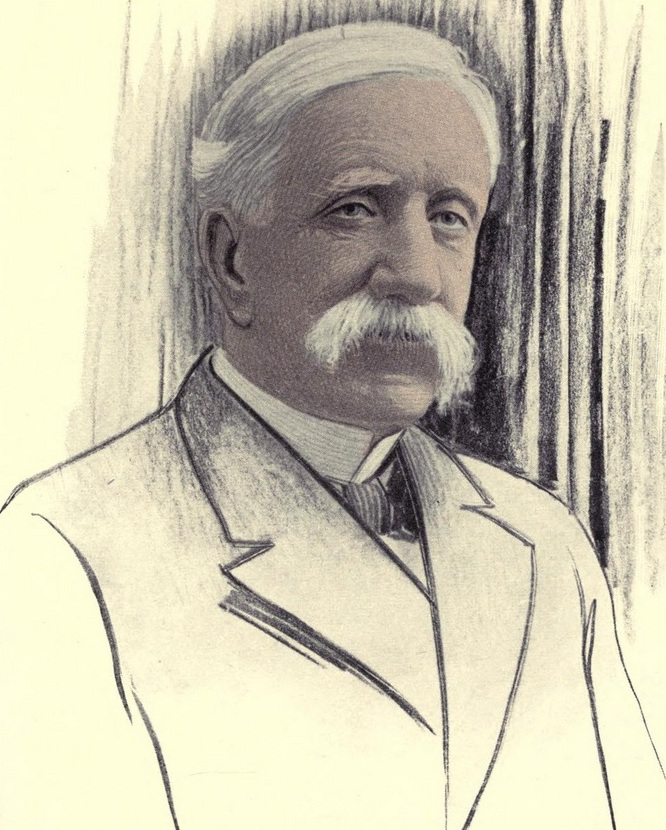
- John M. Farquhar, who received the Medal of Honor, served in the 89th Illinois. He was later a member of United States House of Representatives from New York
- Active: August 27, 1862 – June 24, 1865
- Disbanded: June 24, 1865
- Country: United States
- Allegiance: Union
- Branch: Infantry
- Size: Regiment
- Nickname: Railroad Regiment
- Motto: Clear the Tracks
- Engagements: American Civil War

Commanders
- Colonel: John Christopher
- Colonel: Charles Truman Hotchkiss

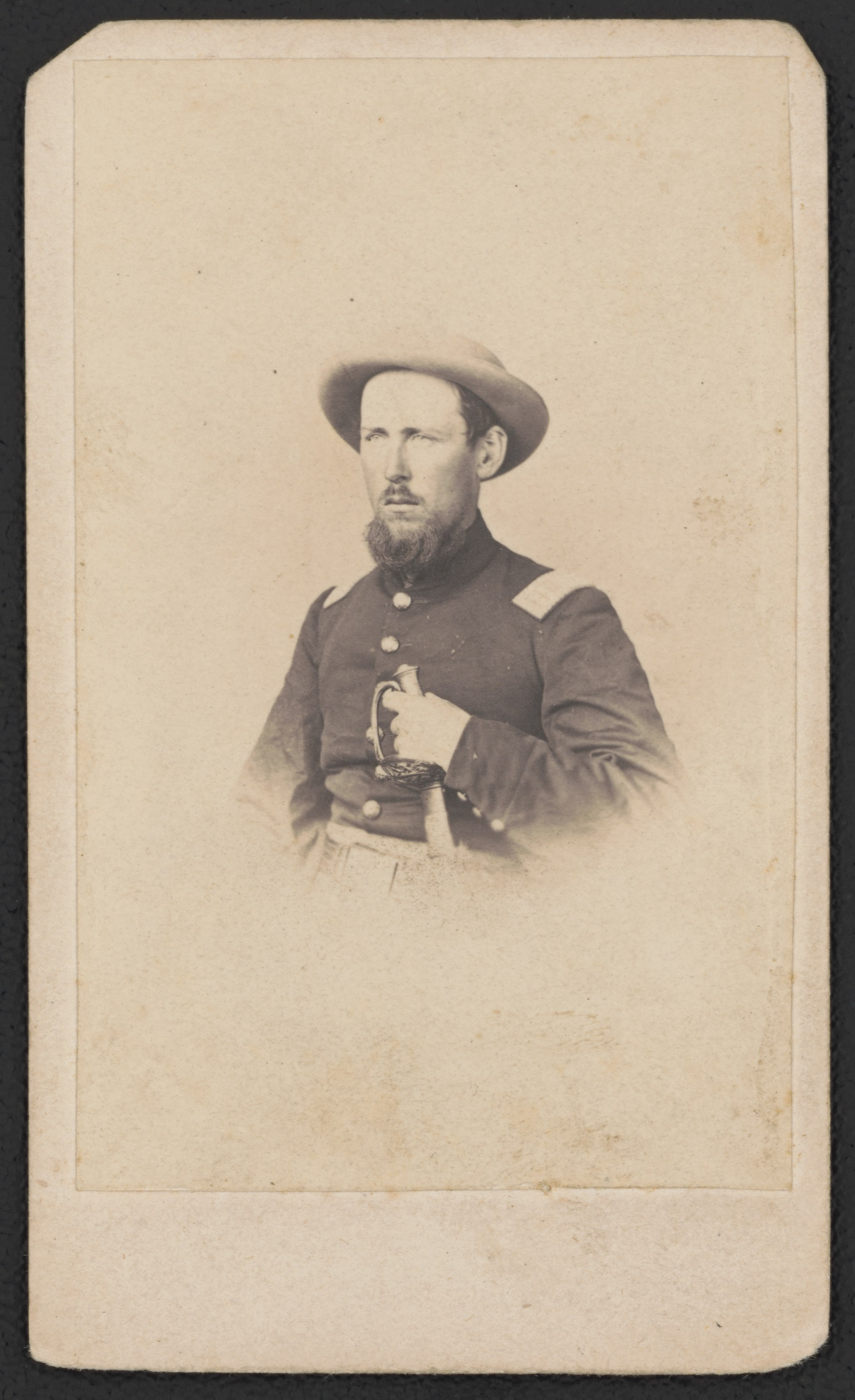
Captain Henry L. Rowell of Co. C, 89th Illinois Infantry Regiment. From the Liljenquist Family Collection of Civil War Photographs, Prints and Photographs Division, Library of Congress

The 89th Illinois Infantry Regiment, nicknamed the Railroad Regiment, was an infantry regiment that served from August 27, 1862, to June 24, 1865, in the Union Army during the American Civil War.

== Service ==
The 89th Illinois Infantry was organized at Chicago, Illinois and mustered into federal service on August 27, 1862. The regiment was nicknamed the "Railroad Regiment" due to the important role Chicago-based railroad companies had in raising and filing the regiment's roster. The regiment's motto, "Clear the Tracks" was stitched onto the national flag. Their regimental flag had a silk blue field with an illustration of a locomotive in the center.

It participated in the battles of Stones River, Liberty Gap, Chickamauga, Orchard Knob and Missionary Ridge, Pickett's Mill, the Atlanta campaign, and Nashville. Its brigade commander for most of the American Civil War was August Willich- regimental commander for most of the war was Charles Truman Hotchkiss. Major John M. Farquhar- then sergeant major- was awarded the Medal of Honor for heroic service at the Battle of Stones River. The regiment was mustered out on June 10, 1865, and discharged at Chicago on June 24, 1865.

== Total strength and casualties ==
12 officers and 121 enlisted men were killed in action or died of their wounds, and 1 officer and 172 enlisted men died of disease, for a total of 306 fatalities.

== See also ==
Horn Brigade

- List of Illinois Civil War Units
