= Battle of Liberty Gap =

Battle of the American Civil War

Coordinates: 35.646°N 86.361°W

- Part of the American Civil War
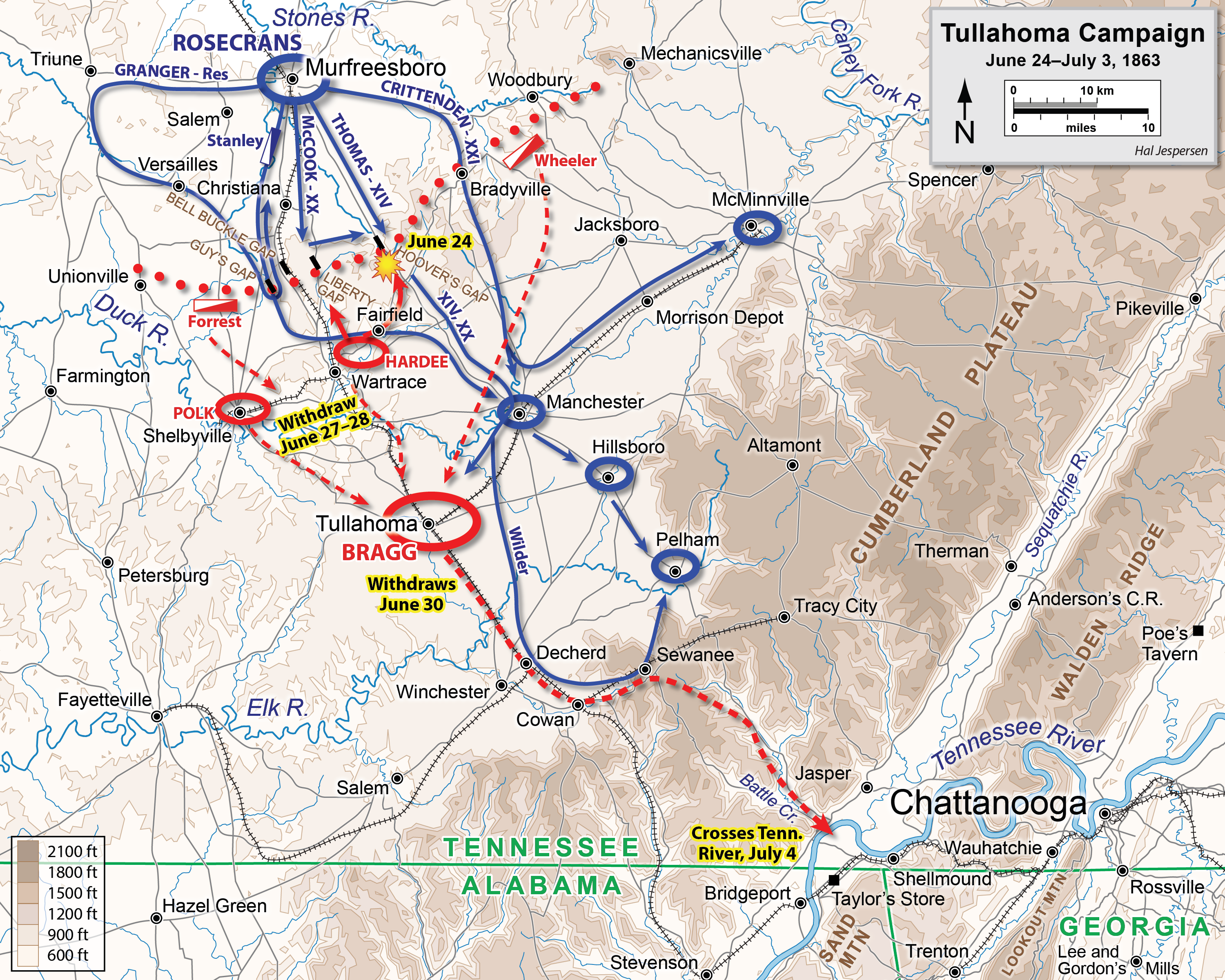
Date	June 24, 1863 – June 26, 1863
Location	Bedford County, Tennessee
Result	Union victory

Belligerents
United States (Union)	(Confederate States of America) CSA (Confederacy)

Commanders and leaders
Alexander M. McCook	St. John R. Liddell

Units involved
XX Corps	Hardee's Corps

Casualties and losses
Unknown	Unknown

The Battle of Liberty Gap was fought during the Tullahoma Campaign of the American Civil War. The battle was an early instance of mounted infantry using Spencer repeating rifles during the war similar to the concurrent battle of Hoover's Gap.

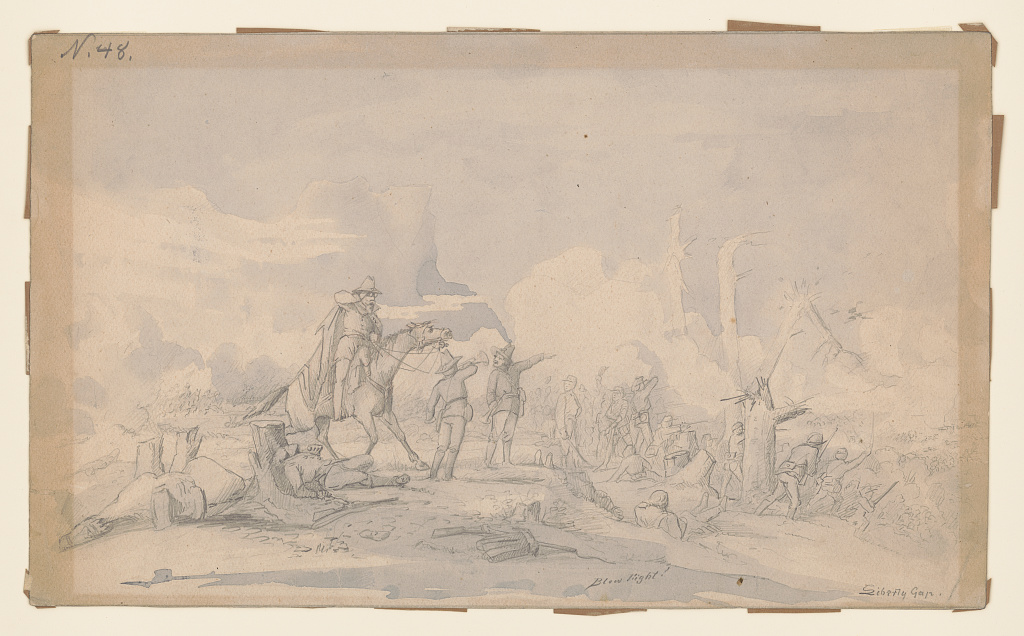
General August Willich at the Battle of Liberty Gap by Adolph Metzner

== Background ==
Following the retreat after the Battle of Stones River, Gen. Braxton Bragg, commander of the Army of Tennessee, established a fortified line along the Duck River from Shelbyville to Wartrace. On the Confederate right, infantry and artillery detachments guarded Liberty, Hoover's, and Bellbuckle gaps through the mountains. Maj. Gen. William S. Rosecrans, commanding the Army of the Cumberland, feigned an attack on Shelbyville but massed against Bragg's right. His troops struck out toward the gaps with George H. Thomas and the XIV Corps moved against Hoover's Gap. Moving against Liberty Gap was Alexander M. McCook and the XX Corps.

== Battle ==
On June 24 McCook sent a brigade under Colonel Luther P. Bradley against the Confederate pickets from General St. John R. Liddell's brigade holding the crossroads at the gap. Bradley's men were screened by Colonel Thomas J. Harrison's 39th Indiana Mounted Infantry Regiment armed with Spencer repeating rifles. Harrison's mounted infantry moved so quickly they captured the crossroad at a cost of only one man wounded. Hearing the gap was lightly defended, McCook wanted to take advantage of the situation and sent Brig. Gen. August Willich's Horn Brigade forward. Though the gap was held in fact only by two Arkansas infantry regiments and an artillery battery, Willich determined they were in a good defensible position. Willich attempted to flank the Confederates with the 32nd Indiana Infantry on the left and Harrison's mounted infantry on the right. The Union and Confederate forces launched attacks and counter-attacks while McCook sent forward the 77th Pennsylvanian and 29th Indiana infantry regiments for support. Liddell saw the futility of attempting to hold the gap and withdrew his forces.

On June 25 Liddell planned to renew the fight by stalling the Union advance through the gap. Liddell's division commander, Patrick R. Cleburne sent forward reinforcements. Late in the morning Liddell opened the fight against Willich's Union brigade. A see-saw battle ensued as both sides brought forward reinforcements. During the fighting Colonel John F. Miller of the 29th Indiana Infantry was seriously wounded, losing an eye. Willich also had an opportunity to test a tactic he developed while a prisoner of war he called “advanced firing”. Using the 49th Ohio Infantry Willich deployed the men in four rows. The first row fired a volley while the fourth row moved forward between the men to fire another volley. Continuing this process allowed the soldiers to keep up a continuous line of fire while moving forward at the same time. Liddell's brigade was finally forced from the field while S.A.M. Wood's neighboring brigade was brought forward but darkness ended the fighting before Wood's men could effectively be brought into action leaving the Federals in control of the gap.

== Aftermath ==
Although slowed by rain, Rosecrans moved on, forcing Bragg to give up his defensive line and fall back to Tullahoma. Rosecrans sent a flying column (Wilder's Lightning Brigade, the same that had spearheaded the thrust through Hoover's Gap on the 24th) ahead to hit the railroad in Bragg's rear. Arriving too late to destroy the Elk River railroad bridge, the Federals tore up much track around Decherd. Bragg evacuated Middle Tennessee.
