= John McCreath Farquhar =

American military figure and politician

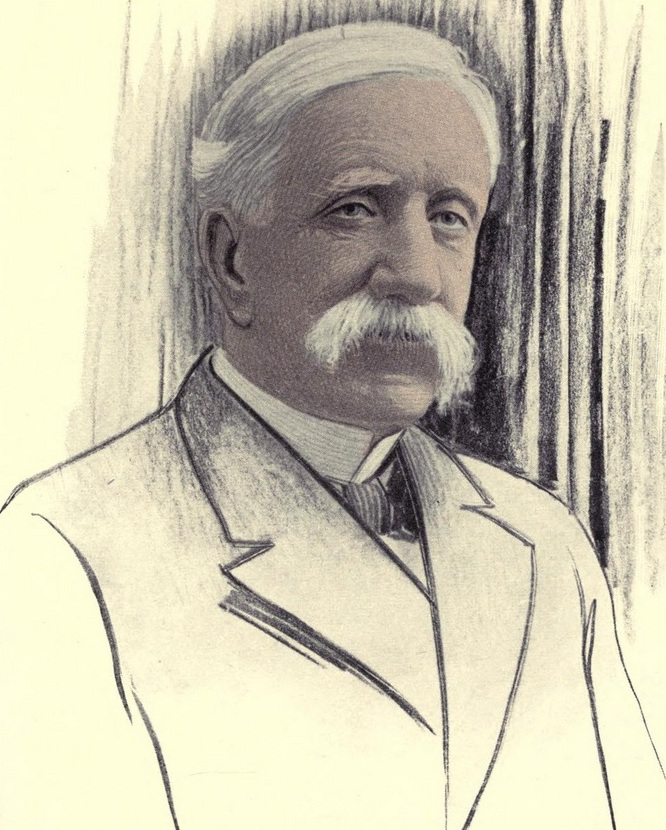
- Medal of Honor recipient, United States Congressman, and printer John McCreath Farquhar c1913
- Born: April 17, 1832 near Ayr, Scotland
- Died: April 24, 1918 (aged 86); Buffalo, New York, U.S.
- Burial place: Forest Lawn Cemetery
- Military career
- Allegiance: United States; Union
- Branch: US Army; Union Army
- Service years: 1862 - 1865
- Rank: Major
- Unit: 89th Illinois Volunteer Infantry Regiment
- Conflicts: American Civil War
- Awards: Medal of Honor

John McCreath Farquhar (April 17, 1832 – April 24, 1918) was a United States representative from New York and a recipient of the United States military's highest decoration, the Medal of Honor.

== Biography ==
Born near Ayr, Scotland, Farquhar attended Ayr Academy. He immigrated to the United States as a boy and settled in Buffalo, New York. He was a printer, editor, and publisher for 33 years, and served as president of the International Typographical Union from 1860 to 1862.

During the Civil War, Farquhar enlisted from Chicago, Illinois, into the Union Army on August 9, 1862, as a private in Company B of the 89th Illinois Volunteer Infantry Regiment. He was promoted to sergeant major and, on December 31, 1862, earned the Medal of Honor at the Battle of Stones River, Tennessee. His official citation reads: "When a break occurred on the extreme right wing of the Army of the Cumberland, this soldier rallied fugitives from other commands, and deployed his own regiment, thereby checking the Confederate advance until a new line was established." His medal was not awarded until several decades later, on August 6, 1902. Promoted again to major, Farquhar served as a judge advocate and inspector in the IV Corps. After his military service, he returned to Buffalo, New York, and resumed his business activities.

Farquhar was elected as a Republican to the 49th, 50th, and 51st congresses (March 4, 1885 – March 3, 1891). He served as chairman of the Committee on Merchant Marine and Fisheries during the 51st Congress. He was not a candidate for renomination to the 52nd Congress.

He served as a member of the United States Industrial Commission from 1898 to 1902, before retiring from public life and active business pursuits.

Farquhar died in Buffalo at age 86 and was interred there in Forest Lawn Cemetery.

== Medal of Honor citation ==
Rank and organization: Sergeant Major, 89th Illinois Infantry. Place and date: At Stone River, Tenn., December 31, 1862. Entered service at: Chicago, Ill. Birth: Scotland. Date of issue: August 6, 1902.

Citation:

When a break occurred on the extreme right wing of the Army of the Cumberland, this soldier rallied fugitives from other commands, and deployed his own regiment, thereby checking the Confederate advance until a new line was established.

== See also ==
- List of American Civil War Medal of Honor recipients: A–F

U.S. House of Representatives
Preceded by William F. Rogers	Member of the U.S. House of Representatives from New York's 32nd congressional district 1885–1891	Succeeded by Daniel N. Lockwood
