= Van Wert, Georgia =

Unincorporated community in Georgia, U.S.

Coordinates: 33°59′14″N 85°02′36″W

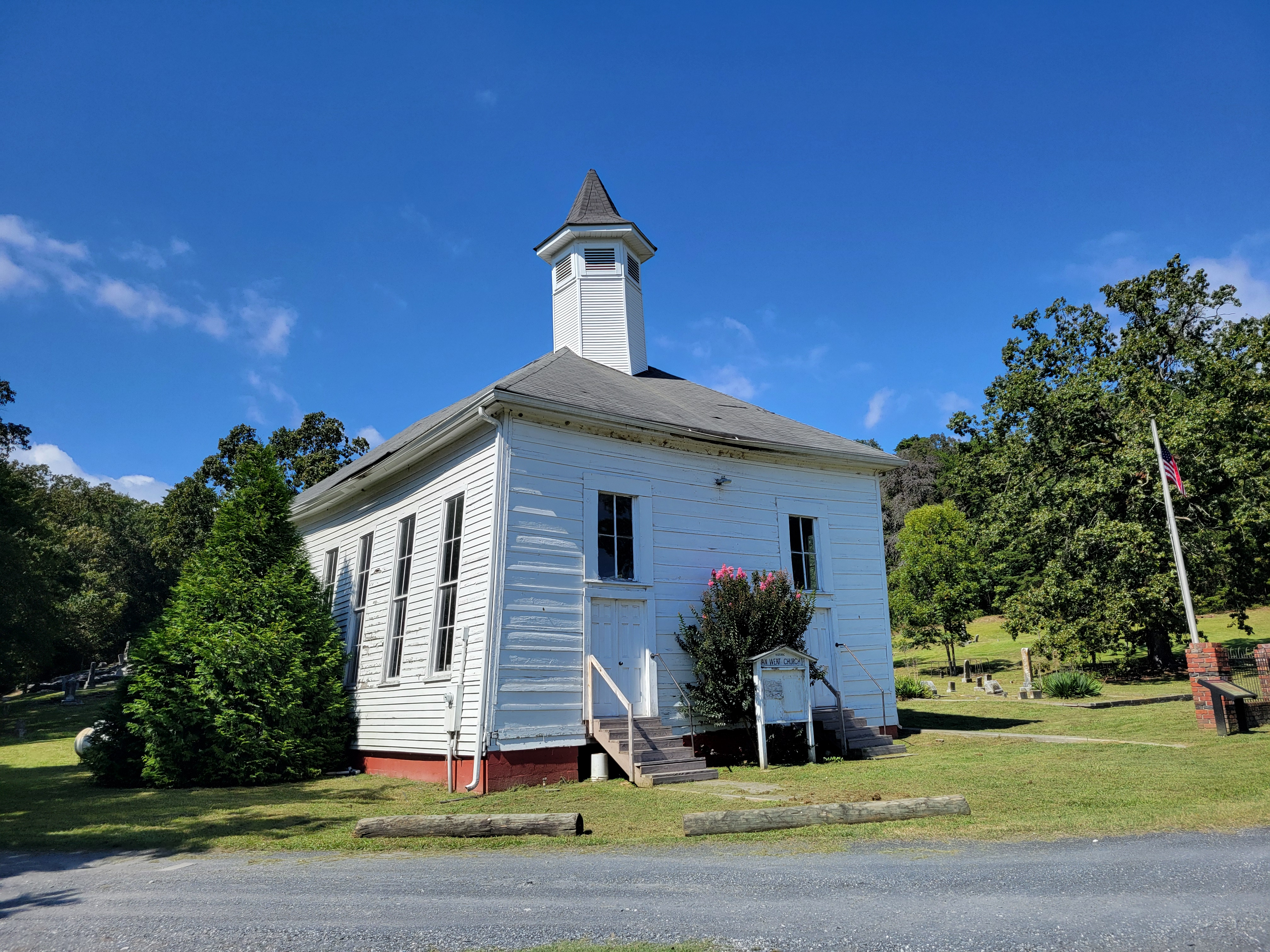
Historic Van Wert Church

Van Wert is an unincorporated community in Polk County, in the U.S. state of Georgia.

== History ==
Van Wert was platted in 1837. The community was named for Isaac Van Wart, a militiaman in the American Revolution. A post office was established at Van Wert in 1837, and remained in operation until being discontinued in 1872.

Van Wert held the county seat of Paulding County from 1838 to 1852, when the area became part of Polk County at the latter's establishment. Dallas replaced Van Wert as the Paulding County seat.

The Georgia General Assembly incorporated Van Wert as a town in 1870. The town's municipal charter was repealed in 1995.
