= XIV Corps (Union army) =

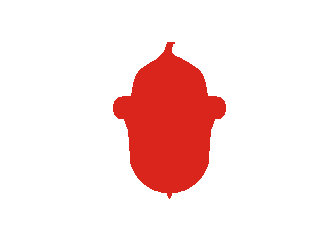
- Union Army 1st Division Badge, XIV Corps
- Active: 1862–1865
- Country: United States of America
- Branch: Union Army
- Type: Corps
- Role: Headquarters
- Part of: Army of the Cumberland; Army of Georgia
- Engagements: American Civil War; Battle of Stones River; Battle of Chickamauga; Battle of Missionary Ridge; Battle of Resaca; Battle of Kennesaw Mountain; Battle of Peachtree Creek; Battle of Utoy Creek; Battle of Jonesboro; March to the Sea; Battle of Bentonville

Commanders
- Notable commanders: William S. Rosecrans; George H. Thomas; John M. Palmer; Richard W. Johnson; Jefferson C. Davis

XIV Corps was a corps of the Union Army during the American Civil War. It was one of the earliest corps formations in the Western Theater of the American Civil War.

== Corps history ==
=== Creation ===
On October 24, 1862, the War Department issued General Orders No. 168, creating both the XIII Corps and the XIV Corps. The XIV Corps was to be organized from troops of the Army of the Cumberland, and to be commanded by General William Rosecrans.

The Army of the Ohio, under the command of Don Carlos Buell was previously divided into three unofficial corps designated I, II and III Corps. When Rosecrans took command the army was reorganized into twelve divisions to be made from 155 regiments of infantry, a regiment of engineers, 35 batteries of artillery, and six regiments of cavalry.

=== Stones River ===
The Army of the Cumberland and XIV Corps were virtually synonymous and therefore command of the corps was divided into three "wings" with the same basic formation as in the former Army of the Ohio. The old I Corps became the Right Wing under Alexander M. McCook. The II Corps became the Left Wing under Thomas L. Crittenden. The III Corps became the Center Wing under George H. Thomas, replacing Charles C. Gilbert. In this formation the corps fought at the Battle of Stones River losing over 25% in killed, wounded or missing.

=== Battle of Chickamauga ===
On January 9, 1863, in the immediate aftermath of Stones River, the XIV Corps wings were given their own official corps designations. McCook's Right Wing became the XX Corps. Crittenden's Left Wing became the XXI Corps. Thomas' Center Wing remained as the XIV Corps. Thomas led the corps to distinction for his defense at Horseshoe Ridge (in particular his actions at Snodgrass Hill) protecting the Federal Army from a complete rout following the Battle of Chickamauga.

=== Battle of Chattanooga ===
Following Chickamauga, Thomas was given command of the Army of the Cumberland and John M. Palmer led the corps at the Battle of Missionary Ridge and during most of the Atlanta campaign.

=== March towards Atlanta ===
Battle of Utoy Creek the XIV Army Corps was placed under the command of the Army of the Ohio MG Schofield 1 August 1864 and the two corps were assigned by Sherman to break the Railroad lines at East Point. The ensuing Battle of Utoy Creek initial assault by Johnson's 1st Division on 5 August and supporting attack on 6 August 1864 came close to success. Due to a disagreement of the date of rank between MG Palmer and MG Schofield after the battle which Schofield unsuccessfully commanded. Richard W. Johnson briefly commanded the corps after Palmer's resignation during the siege of Atlanta 1864. Jefferson C. Davis took command of the corps and led it during the Battle of Jonesboro.

=== Savannah Campaign ===
Following the fall of Atlanta, the XIV Corps was detached from the Army of the Cumberland and assigned to what became the Army of Georgia. Davis remained in command of the corps and fought at the Battle of Bentonville in 1865.

== Corps badge origin ==
This corps's distinctive badge was in the shape of that of an acorn. The acorn was chosen to remind the men of their tough times in late 1863 when they were left in the wilderness without supplies and forced to survive on acorns.
