= XX Corps (Union army) =

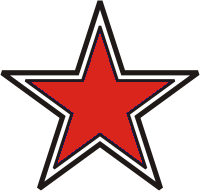
- XX Corps badge
- Active: 1863–1865
- Country: United States of America
- Branch: Union Army
- Type: Army Corps
- Size: Corps
- Part of: Army of the Cumberland
- Engagements: American Civil War

Commanders
- Notable commanders: Joseph Hooker; Henry W. Slocum; Alpheus S. Williams

Insignia
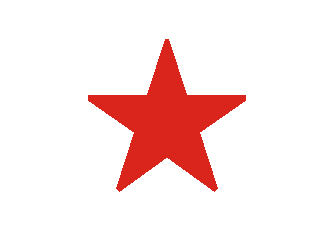
- 1st Division

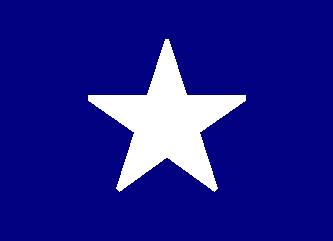
- 2nd Division

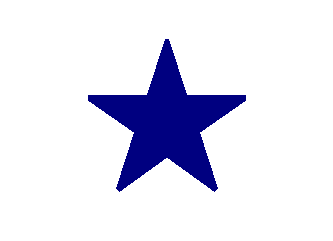
- 3rd Division

Two corps of the Union Army were called XX Corps during the American Civil War. Though both served in the Union Army of the Cumberland, they were distinct units and should be recognized as such.

== McCook's Corps ==
The first XX Corps, under the command of Alexander M. McCook, was organized in the aftermath of the Battle of Stones River in January 1863 from what had been the XIV Corps, or right wing of the army, at that battle. It was so identified with its commander that it was generally referred to by other soldiers and even officers as "McCook's corps".

The corps took part in a skirmish with Bragg's rearguard at Liberty Gap, Tennessee, during the Tullahoma Campaign in June 1863. It fought its only major battle under this designation at Chickamauga, where it suffered horrendous casualties in the two days of fighting. The corps took heavy casualties, and it (along with Thomas L. Crittenden's XXI Corps), became consolidated into the new IV Corps. McCook, blamed in large part for the failure at Chickamauga, was relieved of command.

=== Command history ===
- Alexander M. McCook, January 9, 1863 – October 9, 1863

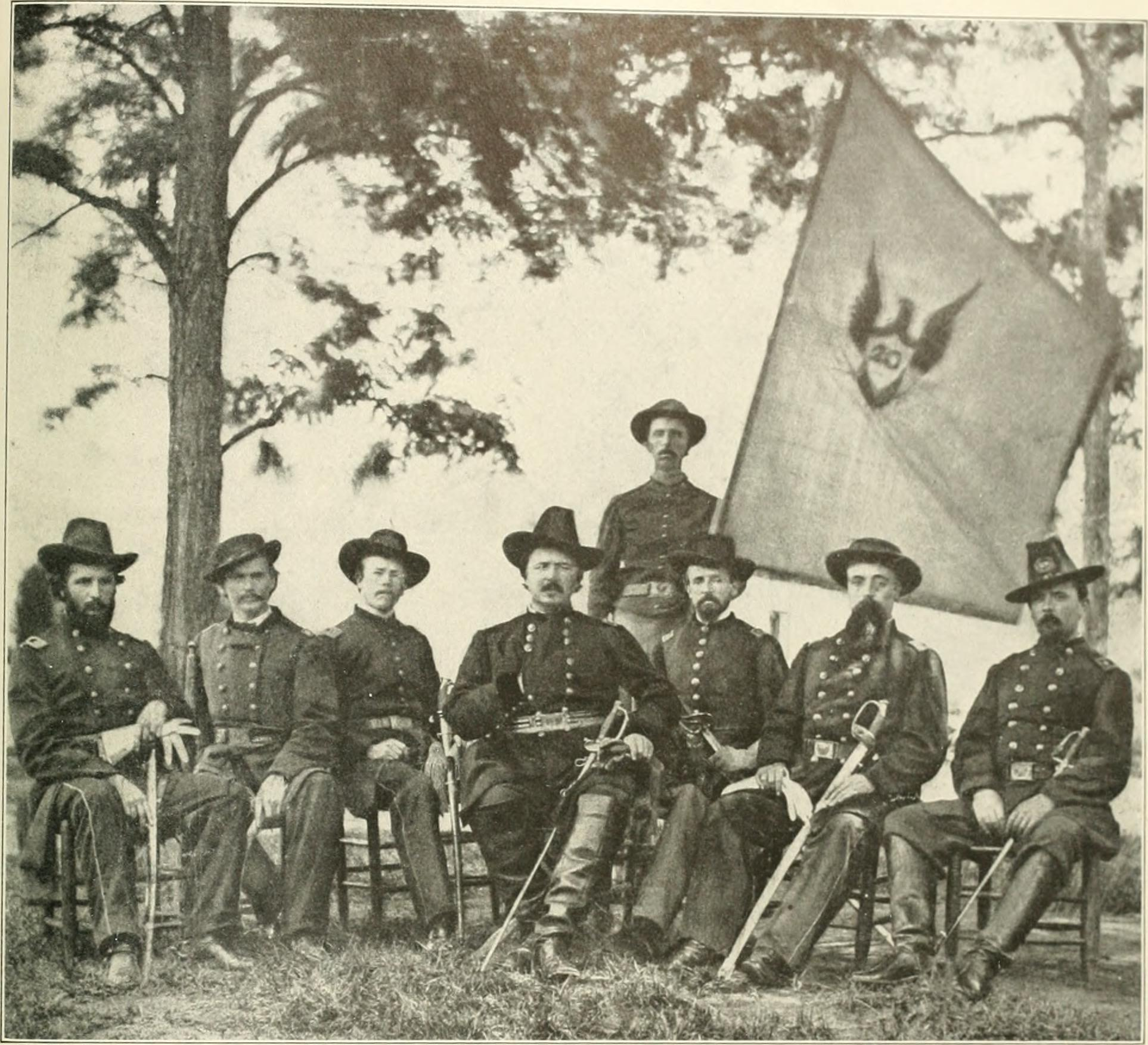
General McCook with the staff at Chickamauga under the Corps banner

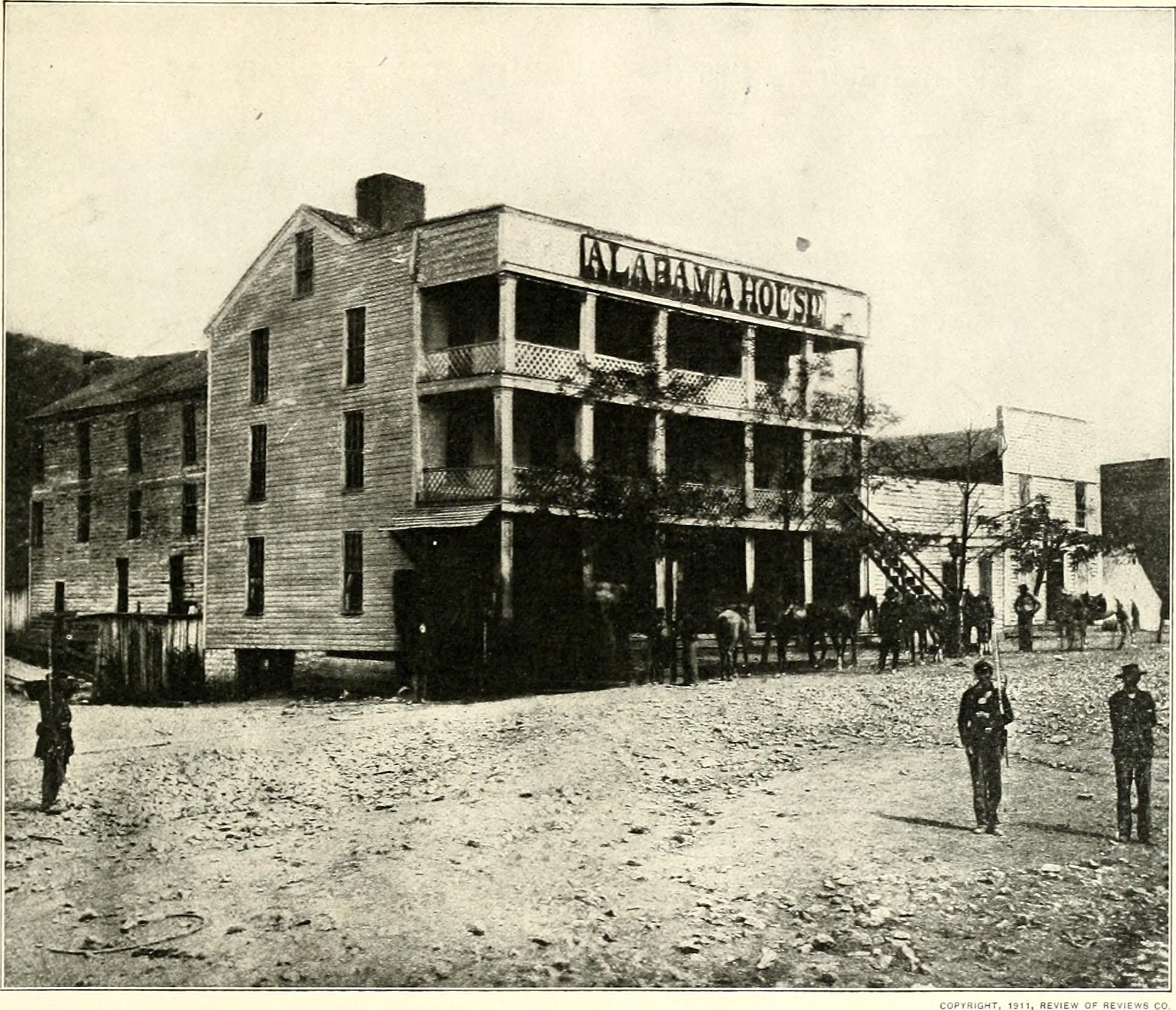
General McCook's headquarters at Stevenson, Alabama

== Hooker's corps ==
After the Battle of Gettysburg, with the armies of the east engaged in stalemate (and a large portion of Robert E. Lee's Army of Northern Virginia, under James Longstreet, was serving with Braxton Bragg in Tennessee), Washington dispatched Joseph Hooker, discredited after his defeat at the Battle of Chancellorsville the previous May, with the XI and XII Corps of the Army of the Potomac to try to relieve Bragg's siege of Chattanooga. The command played a decisive role in the Battle of Wauhatchie, which opened up the "Cracker Line" to the besieged Union army, and seized Lookout Mountain in the famed "Battle Above The Clouds" during the early stages of the Battle of Chattanooga.

On April 4, 1864, just before the onset of the Atlanta campaign, William T. Sherman, authorized the consolidation of XI and XII Corps as XX Corps, under Hooker's command, to serve in the Army of the Cumberland. Units from XI and XII Corps were combined in each division. The corps fought valiantly throughout the Atlanta campaign. After James B. McPherson was killed in the Battle of Atlanta on July 22, Oliver O. Howard was made commander of the Army of the Tennessee. Hooker, partially because Howard was junior to him and partially because he blamed Howard (who had commanded XI Corps at the Battle of Chancellorsville, where it had been routed during Stonewall Jackson's famed flank march) for his part in the defeat of the Army of the Potomac, resigned. He was replaced first by Alpheus S. Williams, and then Henry W. Slocum, both former XII Corps commanders. Its troops were the first to enter Atlanta after its surrender on September 1, and later went with Sherman's Army of Georgia during his March to the Sea. Williams commanded it from then until the Carolinas campaign (Slocum having been promoted to army command in the meantime). It played a major part in the seizure of Savannah in December and was actively engaged throughout the Carolinas Campaign, particularly at Bentonville, where it absorbed the main blow of Joseph E. Johnston's counterattack. Because fighting at Bentonville had not destroyed Johnston's army, Sherman replaced Williams with the more aggressive Joseph A. Mower. It took part in the Grand Review and was disbanded in June 1865.

=== Command history ===
- Joseph Hooker, April 14, 1864 – July 28, 1864
- Alpheus S. Williams, July 28, 1864 – August 27, 1864
- Henry W. Slocum, August 27, 1864 – November 11, 1864
- Alpheus S. Williams, November 11, 1864 – April 2, 1865
- Joseph A. Mower, April 2, 1865 – June 4, 1865
