= Jacob Lavinsky =

American settler and soldier (1832–1901)

- Jagor Lavinsky
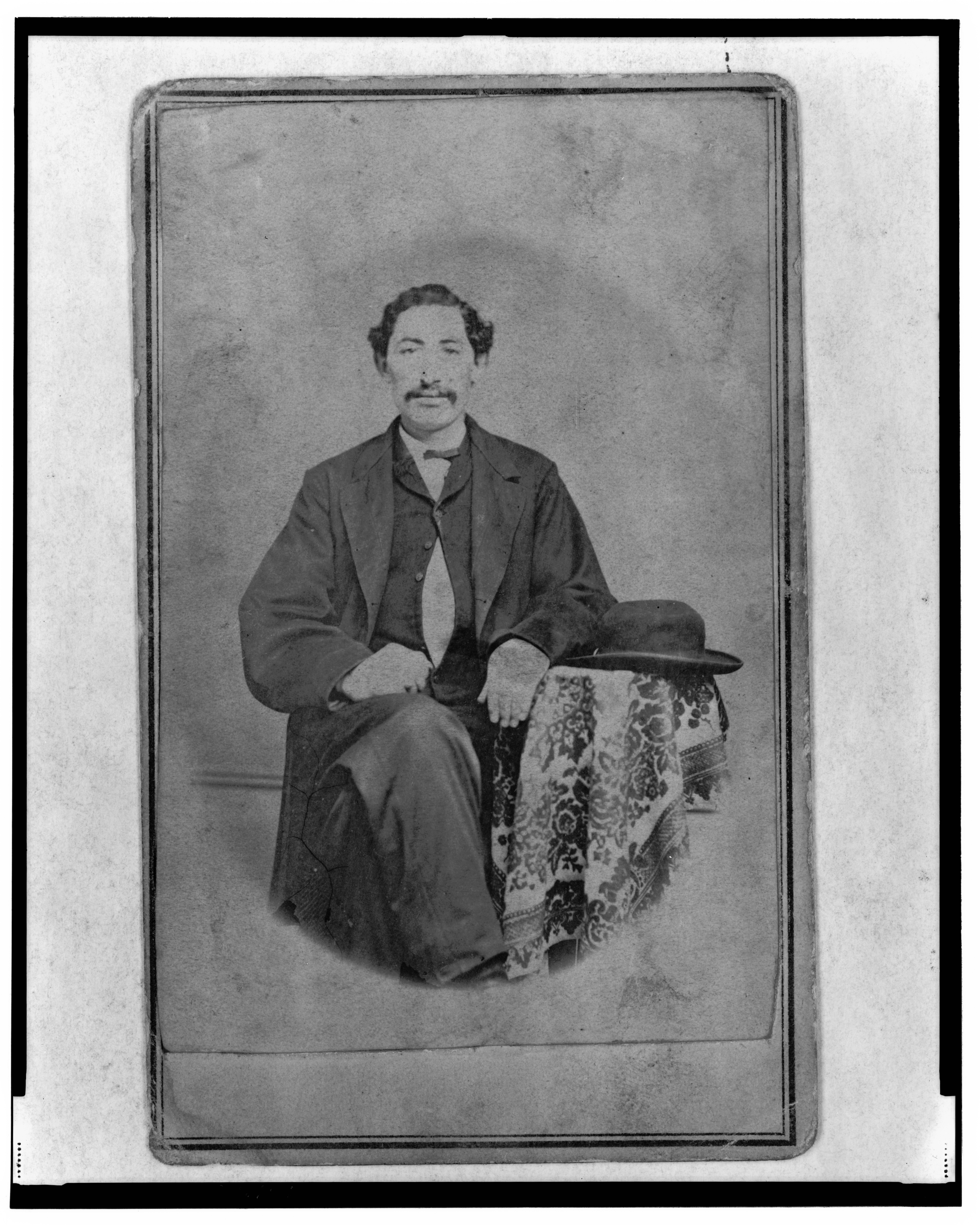
- Lavinsky in 1861
- Born: July 4, 1832; Prussia
- Died: August 27, 1901 (aged 69); Cooper, Chilton County, Alabama, US
- Spouse: Mary A. Mims
- Military career
- Allegiance: Union Army
- Service years: 1861–1865
- Rank: Private
- Units: Company A, 32nd Indiana Infantry Regiment
- Conflicts: American Civil War

Jagor Lavinsky (July 4, 1832 – August 27, 1901), also known as Jacob "Jake" Lavisnky (also spelled as Lewinsky, Lawinsky, or Labinsky) was a farmer, valet, and Turner from Fort Wayne, Indiana. While serving in the 32nd Indiana Infantry Regiment during the American Civil War, Lavinsky became the subject of several artistic works and caricatures by Indiana artist Adolph G. Metzner. Known by Metzner as the "camp comedian", Lavinsky became the regiment's unofficial comedian and was notoriously known throughout the regiment for his practical jokes and witty humor while on campaign during the course of the war.

== Early life and military service ==
Jacob Lavinsky was born on July 4, 1832, in Prussia to a German Jewish family, his birth name is listed as Jagor Lavinsky, possibly a variant of the Slavic name Yegor. Lavinsky's family eventually moved to Fort Wayne, Indiana. While in Fort Wayne Lavisnky became involved with the Turners, a German gymnastics and political society.

Lavinsky volunteered for service in the Union Army during the American Civil War on September 10, 1861, in the Fort Wayne "Turner Company" under Captain Francis Erdelmeyer. In the regiment's official muster roll and on his service reference card he is listed as "Jacob Labinsky". Lavinsky served in Company A in the 32nd Indiana Infantry Regiment, also known as the 1st German Regiment for its high enlistment of German Americans living in Indiana. Company A of the regiment was commanded by Captain Erdelmeyer who had previously served in the 11th Indiana Infantry Regiment under Lew Wallace. While serving in Company A Lavinsky became notoriously known as a jokester within his company and became a favored subject which his 1st Lieutenant, Adolph Metzner routinely sketched. According to the Library of Congress "Metzner's 137 drawings constitute the largest collection of drawings from the Civil War's western front campaigns so far in the Library of Congress collections".

== Later life ==
Following the war during the reconstruction era Lavinsky moved to the state of Alabama where he owned a farm and substantial amount of land. on June 30, 1872, Lavisnky married Mary A. Mims in Chilton County, Alabama. Together they had four children. Lavinsky died on August 27, 1901.

== Gallery ==
"Der Jacob!"

Camp of the Thirty-second Regiment Indiana Volunteers, Company A, near Stones River, Tennessee, January 1863

Captain Francis (Frank) Erdelmeyer and Private Jacob Lawinsky at an outpost near Corinth, Mississippi, April 1862

Captain Adolph Metzner, Lieutenant Louis von Trebra and Jacob Labinsky, Huntsville, Alabama, July 1862

Jacob Labinsky, Company A, 32nd Regiment, Indiana Volunteers "The Camp Comedian"

William G. Mank, 11th Indiana Regiment (left) and Jacob Labinsky, 32nd Indiana Regiment (right)
