= Vine Street Hill Cemetery =

Cemetery in Hamilton County, Ohio

- German Evangelical Protestant Cemetery Chapel
- U.S. National Register of Historic Places
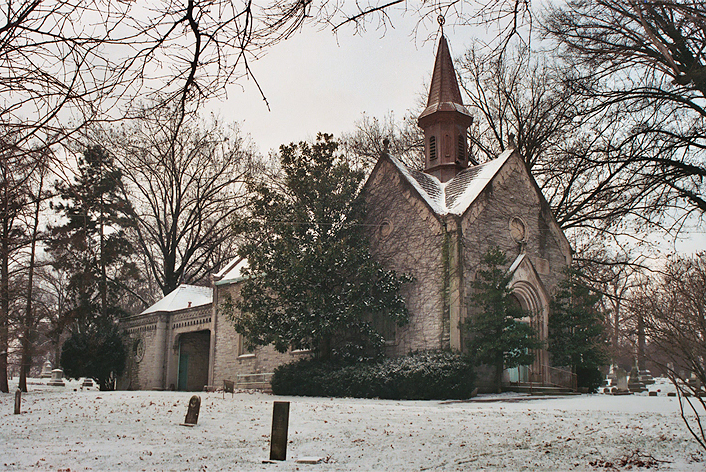
- Distant view

- Location within Ohio Location within the United States
- Location: 3701 Vine St., Cincinnati, Ohio
- Coordinates: 39°9′21″N 84°30′32″W
- Area: Less than 1 acre (0.40 ha)
- Built: 1850
- Architect: George & August Brink
- Architectural style: Romanesque Revival
- NRHP reference No.: 08000115
- Added to NRHP: February 28, 2008

Vine Street Hill Cemetery is a notable nonprofit cemetery located at 3701 Vine Street, Cincinnati, Ohio. The cemetery was originally known as the German Evangelical Protestant Cemetery on Carthage Road or just Carthage Road Cemetery, located three and one half miles from Downtown Cincinnati.

== History ==
=== 19th century ===
Members of the German Evangelical Reform Church of St. Paul and of St. Peter founded the cemetery, now known as the Vine Street Hill Cemetery in 1849. On February 26, 1850, the first land for the cemetery was purchased from Samuel West. In August 1882 additional land was purchased from F. Feldman and S. West.

The cemetery was originally known as the German Evangelical Protestant Cemetery on Carthage Road or just Carthage Road Cemetery, located three and one half miles from the City of Cincinnati. The name of Carthage for this section of the road starting north of Glenmary Avenue was changed to Vine Street after the suburb of Clifton was annexed to Cincinnati in 1896. The original and main entrance to the cemetery is 3701 Vine Street.

The German-American architect-builders George and August Brink of Cincinnati designed the chapel located in the center of the cemetery. Cost estimates for the new chapel complex was $15,000 as reported in an article appearing in The Inland Architect in 1884. George and August Brink are also credited for remodeling the home of John Hauck, a prominent German-American brewer in Cincinnati whose home is now a museum within the Dayton Street Historic District.

=== 20th and 21st centuries ===
The cemetery became known as the Vine Street Hill Cemetery in 1941.

The German Evangelical Protestant Cemetery Chapel was named to the National Register of Historic Places on February 28, 2008. The chapel's architectural details and craftsmanship expands knowledge of the work and contributions of German-American architects-builders and the specific contributions of George and August Brink to late nineteenth century Cincinnati.

== Notable burials ==
- August Bloedner, designer of the 32nd Indiana Monument
- August "Garry" Herrmann, Cincinnati politician, owner of Cincinnati Reds, chairman of the National Baseball Commission
- Nick Altrock, Major League Baseball player
- Edward William Boers, Medal of Honor recipient
- Phelps "Catfish" Collins, guitarist
- William Edward Voll (1893-1982), Pitcher for the Cincinnati Red Stockings

== Sources ==
- The Hamilton County Chapter of the Ohio Genealogical Society, Hamilton County, Ohio Burial Records. Volume Three; “Vine Street Hill Cemetery 1852-1977.” Cincinnati, OH 1991
- Segal, Alfred. Cincinnati Post & Times Star. “In Which We Report on 3701 Vine.” (June 30, 1962)
- Vine Street Hill Cemetery Association, History of Vine Street Hill Cemetery
- The Inland Architect, IV, 2 (September 1884), p. 31
- Cook, William A., August "Garry" Herrmann, A Baseball Biography, McFarland & Company, Inc. Publishers, Jefferson, NC 2008
- Langsam, Walter E. Great Houses of the Queen City, Two Hundred Years of Historic and Contemporary Architecture and Interiors in Cincinnati and Northern Kentucky. The Cincinnati Historical Society, Cincinnati, OH 1997
