= August Bloedner =

Christian Friedrich August Bloedner
- Born: c1825 Altenburg, Duchy of Saxe-Altenburg
- Died: November 14, 1872 (aged c47); Cincinnati, Ohio, United States
- Burial place: Vine Street Hill Cemetery
- Military career
- Allegiance: United States
- Branch: Union Army
- Rank: First Sergeant
- Unit: 32nd Regiment Indiana Infantry
- Conflicts: American Civil War
- Other work: marble/stone cutter

Christian Friedrich August Bloedner (c. 1825 - 1872) was a Saxe-Altenburg-born carpenter from Cincinnati, who served with the 32nd Regiment Indiana Infantry during the American Civil War. He built the 32nd Indiana Monument.

== Biography ==
August Bloedner was born around 1825 in Altenburg, Duchy of Saxe-Altenburg. Emigrating to the United States, he lived in Cincinnati, Ohio until enlisting in the 32nd Regiment Indiana Infantry in August 1861. He commemorated the deaths of his comrades killed in action at the Battle of Rowlett's Station, Kentucky, in December 1861, by building the first American Civil War monument. This was the 32nd Indiana Monument, completed in January 1862. It was placed in Cave Hill Cemetery in Louisville, Kentucky after the Civil War.

Following the conclusion of the war, Bloedner returned to Cincinnati, where he worked as a marble and stone cutter until his death from heart disease on November 14, 1872.
