= Heinrich von Trebra =

German-American Military Officer (1861–1863)

Colonel Heinrich von Trebra
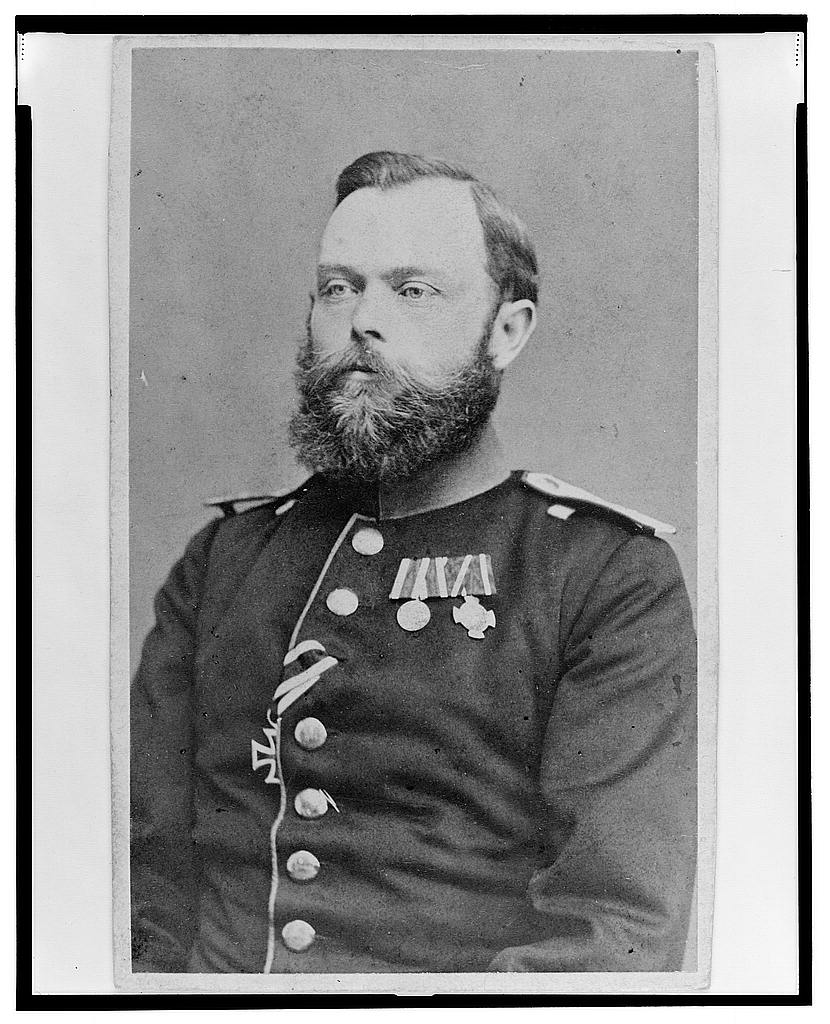
- Trebra c.1850 in Prussian uniform
- Born: Karl Friedrich Heinrich von Trebra; October 23, 1830; Lübben, Prussia
- Died: August 7, 1863 (aged 32); Arcola, Illinois
- Cause of death: Typhoid fever
- Burial place: Arcola Township Cemetery; Arcola, Illinois
- Spouse: Janet von Trebra
- Children: 1
- Relatives: Louis von Trebra (brother)
- Military career
- Allegiance: Kingdom of Prussia; United States; Union
- Branch: Prussian Army; United States Army; Union Army
- Service years: 1861–1863
- Rank: Colonel
- Nickname: Henry
- Units: Company F, 32nd Indiana Infantry Regiment
- Commands: 32nd Indiana Infantry Regiment
- Conflicts: German Revolution; American Civil War
- Awards: Iron Cross 2nd Class

Karl Friedrich Heinrich "Henry" von Trebra (October 23, 1830 – August 7, 1863), also known in some sources as Henry von Trebra, was a German American soldier and military officer who served in the German revolutions of 1848–1849 and the American Civil War. Trebra is most noted for defeating Terry's Texas Rangers with a significantly smaller force at the Battle of Rowlett's Station in 1861, one of the only times an infantry square was used to defeat cavalry during the war. For a brief time Trebra commanded the 32nd Indiana Infantry Regiment, an ethnic German regiment raised in Indiana.

== Early life ==
Karl Friedrich Heinrich von Trebra was born on October 23, 1830, in the city of Lübben, then part of the Kingdom of Prussia. He was the son of Carl Gustav and Louise Voss von Trebra. Trebra had one brother, Louis Ernst von Trebra (1841–1911), who served with him later during the American Civil War. Trebra was from a military family and served as a cadet in the Kriegsschules in both Potsdam and Berlin. Trebra later served in the Prussian Army as a Leutnant (Lieutenant) during the German revolutions of 1848–1849 on the side of Frederick William IV of Prussia before defecting to British North America with his family in 1854. According to the Chicago Daily Tribune, while in the United States Trebra was engaged in the milling of flour in Chicago, Illinois. During his time in Illinois Trebra and his younger brother Louis lived on a farm in Madison, Illinois.

== American Civil War ==
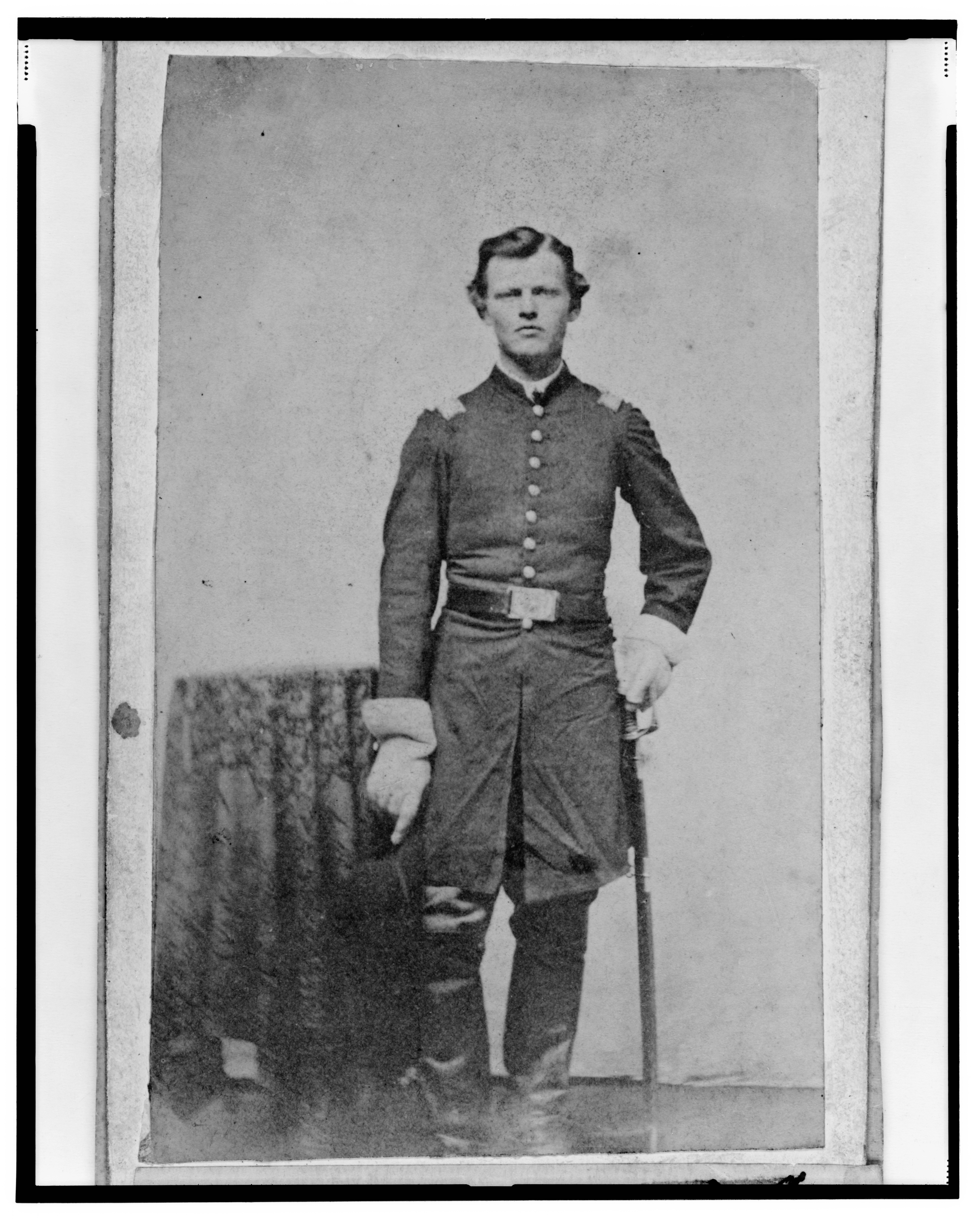
Trebra's younger brother, Captain Louis Ernst von Trebra c.1863

At the outbreak of the American Civil War Trebra and his brother Louis volunteered for service in the Union Army in Indianapolis. In August 1861 the Trebra brothers volunteered for service in the 32nd Indiana Infantry Regiment which was primarily made up of ethnic German volunteers from Ohio, Indiana, Kentucky, and Illinois. Trebra was initially appointed as the regiment's drillmaster by the 32nd Indiana's Colonel, August Willich before being promoted to the rank of Lieutenant Colonel of the 32nd Indiana and placed on the Field and Staff of the regiment. Upon his arrival to Indianapolis in 1861 Trebra was immediately a figure who was made into a caricature by local Indianapolis artist and Lieutenant of Company A Adolph G. Metzner (see Gallery).

=== Rowelett's Station ===
The regiment's first engagement was at the Battle of Rowlett's Station (also known as Battle of Woodsonville or the Battle of Green River) on December 17, 1861, in Hart County, Kentucky. A detachment of two companies under the command of Trebra scouted ahead of the 500-man battalion near Munfordville, Kentucky, and eventually engaged the Confederate cavalry force of Terry's Texas Rangers under the command of Benjamin Franklin Terry. Trebra was able to repel Terry's cavalry by forming an infantry square with bayonets which he did so successfully and repulsed the cavalry and infantry force under Terry and Thomas C. Hindman.

Trebra was promoted to the rank of Colonel on August 18, 1862, after Willich was promoted to the rank of Brigadier General and appointed to command the Horn Brigade. Trebra would lead the 32nd Indiana from August 1862 until his death a year later in August 1863.

== Death ==
Trebra had been sick with typhoid fever since October 16, 1862 when he first contracted it after arriving in Crab Orchard, Kentucky, following the Battle of Shiloh. Trebra was later medically evacuated to Louisville, Kentucky, in 1863 and eventually medically discharged from service due to the illness. Trebra died on August 7, 1863, in Arcola, Illinois. Following his death Trebra's Lieutenant Colonel, Francis Erdelmeyer of Indianapolis, assumed command of the regiment for the remainder of the war. Trebra is buried at the Arcola Township Cemetery in Arcola.

Trebra's younger brother Louis would eventually rise to the rank of Captain and command Company E of the 32nd Indiana. Louis married Trebra's widow, Janet von Trebra, and raised Trebra's son (Louis's nephew), Henry Carl. Louis and Janet eventually had four girls and moved to Manhattan, Kansas, where Louis would die in 1911.

== Gallery ==
The images below of Trebra by Indianapolis artist and Lieutenant Adolph G. Metzner are held by the Library of Congress:

Field staff, 32nd Regiment, Indiana Volunteers (Trebra is second from left)

Attention! Lieutenant Colonel Henry von Trebra August 26, 1861

Lieutenant Colonel Henry von Trebra

Henry Von Trebra & Louis V. Trebra arriving at Camp Morton in Indianapolis from their farm in Madison, Illinois

Hans, the cook of Company "A" and Henry von Trebra, Indianapolis, August 1861

Captain Adolph Metzner, Lieutenant Louis von Trebra and Jacob Labinsky, Huntsville, Alabama, July 1862

== See also ==
- Von Trebra
