= August Willich =

Prussian-American general and communist revolutionary

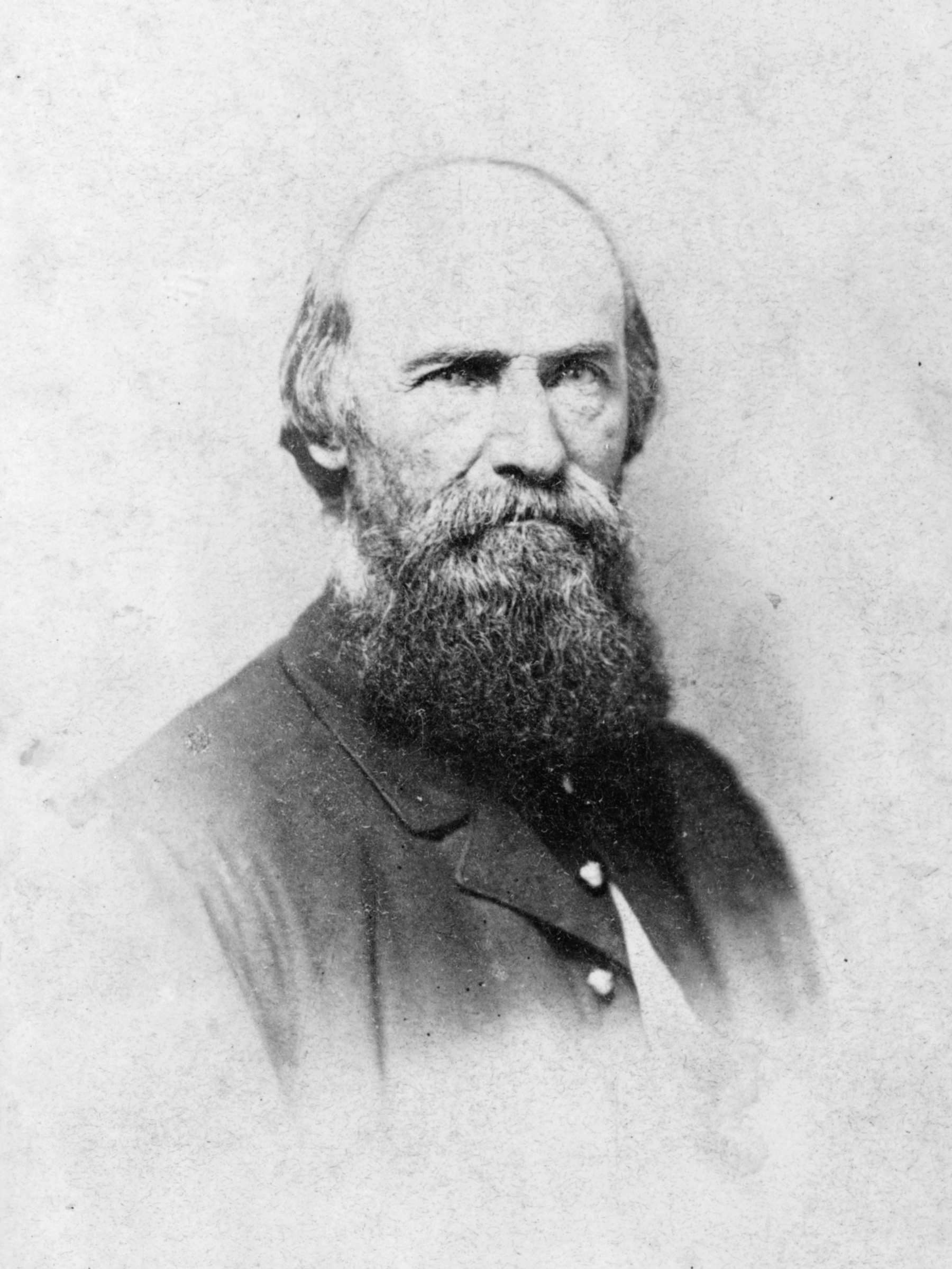
- Willich in 1861

Hamilton County Auditor
- In office 1867–1869
- Preceded by: S. W. Seiburn
- Succeeded by: George S. LaRue

Personal details
- Born: Johann August Ernst von Willich; November 19, 1810 Braunsberg, East Prussia, Prussia
- Died: January 22, 1878 (aged 67) St. Marys, Ohio, U.S.
- Resting place: Elmgrove Cemetery, St. Marys, Ohio
- Party: Communist League (1847–1852); Republican (after 1854)
- Other political affiliations: National Union (1865)

Military service
- Allegiance: Prussia; United States (Union)
- Branch/service: Prussian Army; Union Army
- Years of service: 1828–1846; 1861–1865
- Rank: Second Lieutenant (Prussian Army); Brigadier General; Brevet Major General
- Unit: 7th (1st Westphalian) Field Artillery Regiment; 9th Ohio Infantry Regiment
- Commands: 32nd Indiana Infantry Regiment; Horn Brigade
- Battles/wars: German revolutions of 1848–49; Palatine uprising; American Civil War; Battle of Rich Mountain; Battle of Rowlett's Station; Battle of Shiloh; Battle of Stones River (POW); Battle of Liberty Gap; Battle of Chickamauga; Battle of Orchard Knob; Battle of Missionary Ridge; Battle of Resaca

August Willich (November 19, 1810 – January 22, 1878), born Johann August Ernst von Willich, was a military officer in the Prussian Army, later enlisting and receiving a commission in the United States Army. Born into Prussian nobility, he formally discarded his title in 1847 and actively participated in the Revolutions of 1848. Willich's militant attitudes towards revolution made him a leading early proponent of communism. Although these revolutions were unsuccessful, he remained an ardent communist.

Disagreements with Karl Marx, as Willich saw Marx as unacceptably conservative, swayed his decision to emigrate to the United States alongside many German radicals. His political beliefs greatly influenced his decision to serve in the Union Army during the American Civil War. Willich saw combat in several high-profile battles including the Battle of Shiloh and Chickamauga. After the war's conclusion and Lincoln's assassination, Willich left the Union Army and offered his expertise to the Prussian military during the Franco-Prussian War but was refused on account of his political beliefs. Willich returned to the United States and lived the remainder of his life quietly in Ohio until his death in 1878. Following his death he was eulogized by his rival Marx and the First International.

== Early life and career ==
Willich was born in Braunsberg, Province of East Prussia. His father, a captain of hussars during the Napoleonic Wars, died when Willich was three years old. With an elder brother, Willich found a home in the family of Friedrich Schleiermacher, a theologian, whose wife was a distant relative. He received a military education at Potsdam and Berlin. Initially an officer in the Prussian Army, serving in the 7th (1st Westphalian) Field Artillery Regiment, he resigned from the army in 1846 as a convinced republican. Willich was not the only republican emerging from that regiment. One of his fellow officers in Münster and Wesel was Fritz Anneke, who also was to become a revolutionary commander in Palatinate 1849 and later a commander in the Union Army. Willich tendered his resignation from the army in a letter written in such terms that, instead of its being accepted, he was arrested and tried by a court-martial. He was acquitted and was permitted to resign.

With Karl Schapper, he was the leader of the left faction of the Communist League. He took an active part in the Revolutions of 1848–49. In 1849, he was leader of a Free Corps in the Baden-Palatinate uprising. Revolutionary thinker Friedrich Engels served as his aide-de-camp. Among his revolutionary friends were Franz Sigel, Friedrich Hecker, Louis Blenker, and Carl Schurz. After the suppression of the uprising, he emigrated to London via Switzerland. He had learned the trade of a carpenter while in England, and so earned his livelihood. In 1850, when the League of Communists split, he (together with Schapper) was leader of the anti-Karl Marx grouping.

In London, Willich became an associate of the French revolutionary and political exile Emmanuel Barthélemy. According to Wilhelm Liebknecht, Willich and Barthélemy plotted to kill Karl Marx for being too conservative. Willich publicly insulted Marx and challenged him to a duel, which Marx refused to fight. Instead Willich was challenged by a young associate of Marx, Konrad Schramm. The pistol duel was fought in Belgium with Barthélemy acting as Willich's second; (Note: Willich was much more active as a revolutionary and advocated more action to disturb the peace and actively revolt against the upper classes. He considered Marx a traitor because Marx was enjoying a very comfortable life in academia in England, much like a "bourgeois", while Willich had left the class he was born into and became a working man.) Schramm was wounded but survived the encounter. Barthélemy was hanged in London in 1855 after shooting and killing his employer and another man.

Coming to the United States in 1853, Willich first found employment at his trade in the Brooklyn Navy Yard. Here his attainments in mathematics and other scientific studies were soon discovered, and he found more congenial work in the coastal survey. In 1858, he was induced to go to Cincinnati as editor of the Cincinnati Republikaner, a German-language free labor newspaper, which he continued until the opening of the Civil War in 1861. Willich became known as one of the "Ohio Hegelians" (followers of German philosopher Georg Wilhelm Friedrich Hegel), along with John Bernhard Stallo, Moncure Daniel Conway, and Peter Kaufmann. Also, in 1853, Willich prompted the establishment of the Milwaukee Turners.

== Civil War ==
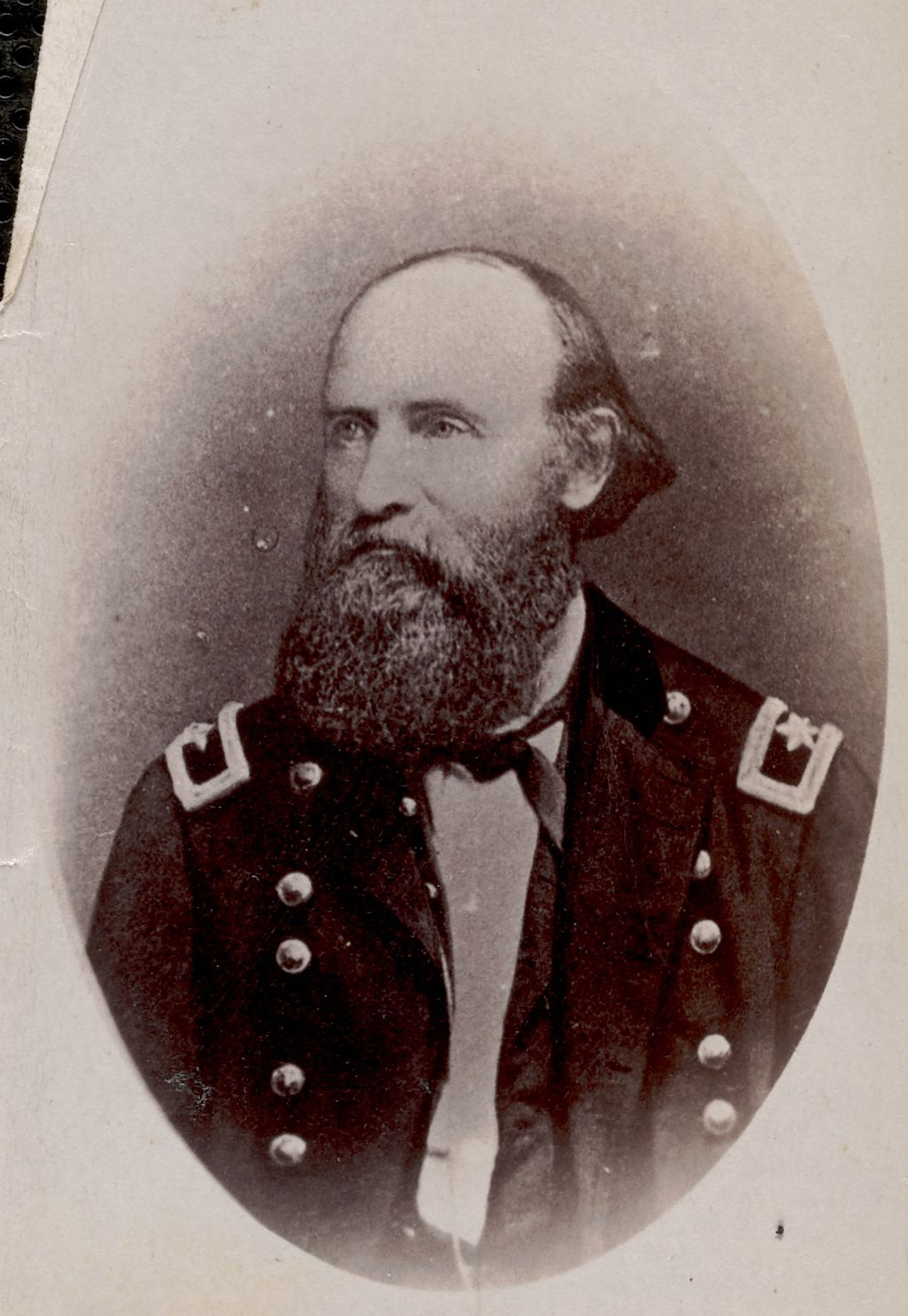
Brigadier general Willich in uniform c. 1862–1865

With the outbreak of the Civil War in early 1861, Willich actively recruited German immigrants in the southwestern Ohio region. He joined the 9th Ohio Infantry ("Die Neuner") as regimental adjutant with the rank of first lieutenant, and was promoted to major in August of that year. He served in western Virginia, seeing action at the Battle of Rich Mountain. Willich then returned to the Ohio River valley over the winter and resumed his recruiting activities. Governor Oliver P. Morton commissioned Willich a colonel of the 32nd Indiana Infantry Regiment, also called the First German (an all-German regiment).

At the request of Governor Oliver P. Morton, Willich assumed command of the 32nd Indiana. He drilled his regiment, in German, to a high degree of professionalism. It made a favorable impression wherever it served. An innovative officer, he suggested construction of special wagons convertible to pontoon boats by removal of wheels. To speed up troop movement and assure combat-ready condition of troops upon arrival on the battlefield, he recommended wagon transport of troops. Though his superiors rejected both ideas, Willich's concern for his men's well-being earned him the nickname "Papa". When possible, he ordered bakery ovens constructed so that troops would have fresh bread.

The 32nd gained nationwide recognition for its stand against Confederate forces at Rowlett's Station, Kentucky. A detachment of 500 men under Lt. Col. Henry von Trebra fought off 1,300 men of Terry's Texas Rangers and infantry under General Hindman. The 32nd formed the "hollow square", and drove the attackers back, losing 10 troopers and 22 wounded, but killing 33 of the enemy, including Col. Terry, and wounding fifty others.

The 32nd saw action at Shiloh on the second day, during which Col. Willich displayed great leadership. When his troops became unsteady under fire, he stood before them, his back to the enemy, and conducted the regiment through the manual of arms. He had the regimental band play "La Marseillaise", the anthem for all republican movements in Europe. Recovering its stability, the 32nd launched a bayonet attack. Afterwards Willich was given command of the Horn Brigade. The 32nd remained in his brigade, under command of von Trebra and, later, Francis Erdelmeyer.

"The Capture of General August Willich at Stone's River Tennessee, 1862" by Adolph Metzner

Rewarded by a promotion to brigadier general of volunteers in July 1862, Willich fought at the Battle of Perryville under Maj. Gen. Don Carlos Buell in Kentucky. He commanded the 1st Brigade, 2nd Division, XIV Corps in December at the Battle of Stones River. He was captured by the Confederates when his horse was shot out from under him. He was sent to Libby Prison for four months, but was paroled and exchanged in May 1863. On May 8, he met with President Lincoln and talked about Richmond's defenses.Returning to the federal army later that year, he was assigned to command of the 1st Brigade, 2nd Division, XX Corps and served with distinction during the Tullahoma Campaign, where his brigade played a key role in holding Liberty Gap. He led a division at the Battle of Chickamauga and saw additional action during the Chattanooga Campaign.

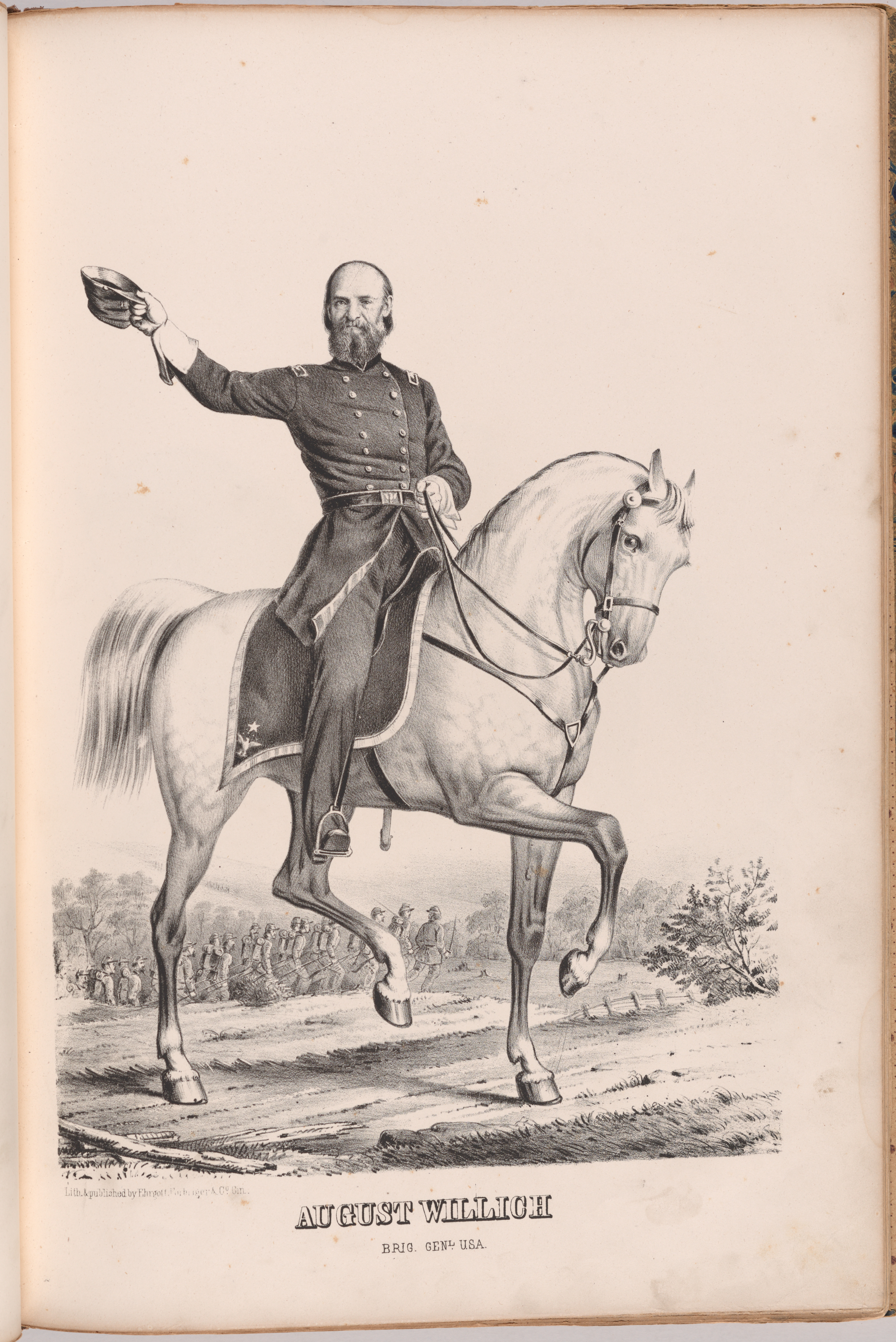
Lithograph of Willich on horseback c. 1862–1864

During the Siege of Chattanooga, the 32nd played a conspicuous part, as Willich's Brigade captured Orchard Knob. Despite only having orders to clear the base of the ridge, Willich ordered the assault up Missionary Ridge that routed the Confederate forces, breaking the siege and clearing the way for the invasion of Georgia. The 32nd Indiana and the 6th Ohio were the first to reach the top. The 32nd participated in the Atlanta campaign with General William Tecumseh Sherman. Before the fall of Atlanta, the 32nd was pulled back and sent via Nashville, Tennessee, to Indianapolis. En route, the 32nd was assigned to counter Confederate guerrilla forces in Kentucky. After three days' fighting, the 32nd returned to Indianapolis. In 1864, Willich led his brigade through Tennessee and Georgia during the Atlanta campaign. He suffered a severe wound in the Battle of Resaca that forced him to leave the field. For the rest of the war, he served in various administrative roles, commanding Union posts in Cincinnati, Covington, Kentucky, and Newport, Kentucky. He received a brevet promotion to major general of US Volunteers on October 21, 1865, then resigned from the army to return to civilian life.

Due to the anti-German sentiment in the nation, and the army in particular, veterans of the 32nd did not re-enlist. Nor did most other all-German regiments. It rankled the German-American soldier that General Joseph Hooker had blamed German troops of the 11th Corps for his defeat at Chancellorsville. The New York Times labeled the 11th Corps "Dutch cowards." Actually, of the corps's 12,000 men, 7,000 were American. Of the remaining 5,000, only one-third were German, these having been the units offering the stiffest resistance to the Confederate attack made by Stonewall Jackson.

The three-year veterans were mustered out on September 7, 1864. The remaining 200 replacements whose terms had not expired were organized into a battalion of four companies under Hans Blume. At war's end they were stationed with General Sheridan's occupation forces in central Texas. They returned to Indianapolis and were mustered out on December 4, 1865.

== Postwar career ==
After the war, Willich returned to Cincinnati and went into government service. He held a series of responsible positions, including auditor of Hamilton County from 1867 to 1869. His home at 1419 Main Street still stands in Cincinnati.

In 1870, he returned to Germany, offering his services to the Prussian army during the Franco-Prussian War. His age, health, and communist views caused him to be refused, however. He stayed in Germany long enough to receive a college degree in philosophy, graduating from the University of Berlin at the age of sixty. Returning to the United States, he died in St. Marys, Ohio, and was buried there in Elmgrove Cemetery.

In his concluding note to the Revelations Concerning the Communist Trial in Cologne, Marx wrote: "In the Civil War in North America, Willich showed that he is more than a visionary".

In honor of Willich's efforts for the Communist struggle, the East German Air Force gave the 31st Nachrichtenbataillon the honor name "August Willich".

== See also ==
- List of American Civil War generals (Union)
- German Americans in the Civil War
