= Peter Kaufmann (philosopher) =

American philosopher

Peter Kaufmann (1800-1869) was known as one of the "Ohio Hegelians", along with John Bernhard Stallo, Moncure Daniel Conway and August Willich. His 1858 book titled, The Temple of Truth, or the Science of Ever-Progressing Knowledge, discussed the process and formation of knowledge according to Hegel's dialectical method, and socialist utopian reform ideals for perfecting humankind.

== See also ==
- American philosophy
- List of American philosophers
