= 32nd Indiana Infantry Regiment =

32nd Indiana Infantry Regiment (1st German)
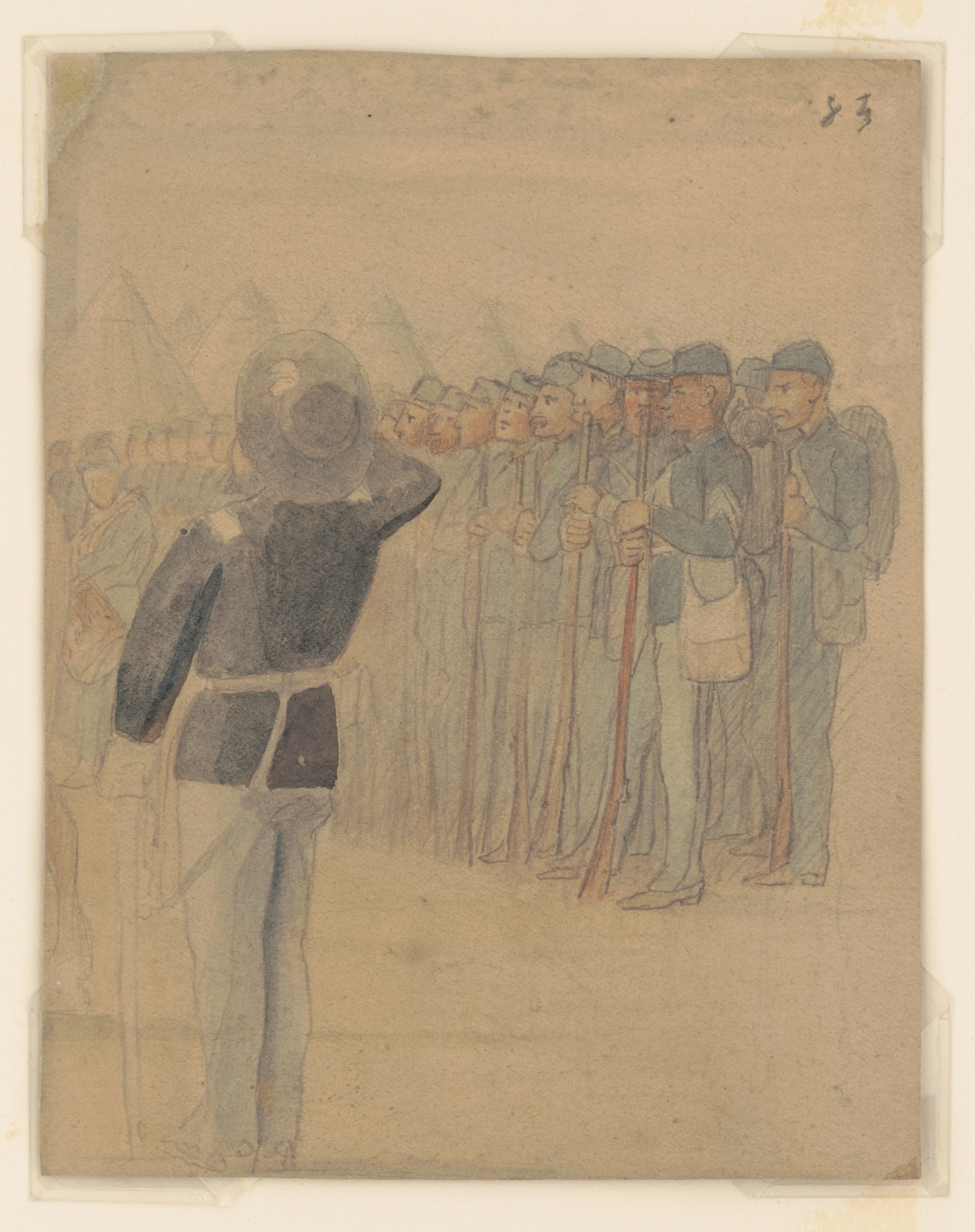
- Troops of the 32nd Regiment, Indiana Volunteers by Adolph Metzner
- Active: August 24, 1861–December 4, 1865
- Country: United States
- Allegiance: Union
- Branch: Infantry
- Size: Regiment
- Engagements: American Civil War: Battle of Rowlett's Station; Battle of Shiloh; Siege of Corinth; Battle of Stones River; Tullahoma Campaign; Battle of Liberty Gap; Chickamauga Campaign; Battle of Chickamauga; Chattanooga campaign; Orchard Knob; Battle of Missionary Ridge; Atlanta campaign; Battle of Rocky Face Ridge; Battle of Resaca; Battle of Adairsville; Battle of New Hope Church; Battle of Dallas; Battle of Pickett's Mill; Battle of Marietta; Battle of Kennesaw Mountain; Battle of Peachtree Creek; Battle of Atlanta; Battle of Jonesborough; Battle of Lovejoy's Station

Commanders
- Col.: August Willich
- Lt. Col.: Heinrich von Trebra
- Lt. Col.: Francis Erdelmeyer

32nd Regiment Indiana Volunteer Infantry was a Union Army infantry regiment during the American Civil War. It was also known as Indiana's "1st German" regiment because its members were mainly of German descent. Organized at Indianapolis, the regiment's first recruits mustered into service on August 24, 1861. From 1861 to 1865, the 32nd Indiana was attached to the first Army of the Ohio and the Army of the Cumberland, where it served in the Western Theater.

The regiment's major engagements included the Battle of Rowlett's Station, the Battle of Shiloh, and Battle of Stones River during 1861 and 1862. The 32nd Indiana also participated in the Tullahoma Campaign, the Chickamauga Campaign, and the Chattanooga campaign in 1863, and in numerous battles during the Atlanta campaign in 1864. After its first group of three-year enlisted men mustered out at Indianapolis on September 7, 1864, the remaining troops in the regiment fought at the Battle of Jonesborough and the Battle of Lovejoy's Station. A reorganized 32nd Indiana, which included a battalion of four companies, was attached to the Department of Texas and served in Texas until its remaining men mustered out of service on December 4, 1865.

== Organization ==
Shortly after the Battle of Fort Sumter in April 1861, Indiana's German community responded to Governor Oliver P. Morton's call for recruits to enlist in the Union Army and urged the governor to establish the state's first German regiment, which became the 32nd Indiana. Governor Morton selected August Willich of Cincinnati, Ohio, at that time a major of the 9th Ohio Volunteer Infantry (Ohio's first German regiment), to organize a new regiment for Indiana. Willich was commissioned as a colonel on August 12, 1861, and arrived in Indianapolis the following day. He established a recruiting headquarters at Union Hall, located at Pennsylvania and Market Streets in Indianapolis, and began the selection process to fill the ranks of his new regiment. Regimental leaders looked for men among the new recruits arriving at Indianapolis's Camp Morton who had fighting experience and were in good physical condition. The first 434 men who enlisted in the regiment for three years mustered into service on August 24, 1861.

Regimental officers at the time it was organized:

- August Willich, colonel
- Carl Schmitt, adjutant
- Heinrich von Trebra, drillmaster

Organization of Regiment in August, 1861.
Company	Moniker	Primary Place of Recruitment	Earliest Captain
A	Turner Company	Indianapolis and Marion County	Francis Erdelmeyer
B		Madison and Jackson County	Jacob Glass
C	The Aurora Company	Aurora and Dearborn County	John L. Geigoldt
D		Dearborn County	John Schwartz
E		Terre Haute and Vigo County	Philip H. Monninger
F	The Cincinnati Company	Cincinnati and Ohio	Frederick August Mueller
G		Lafayette and Tippecanoe County	Peter Joseph Welschbillig
H		New Albany and Floyd County	Franz "Frank" Kodalle
I			William Seivers
K		Evansville and Vanderburgh County	Andreas Winter

== Service ==
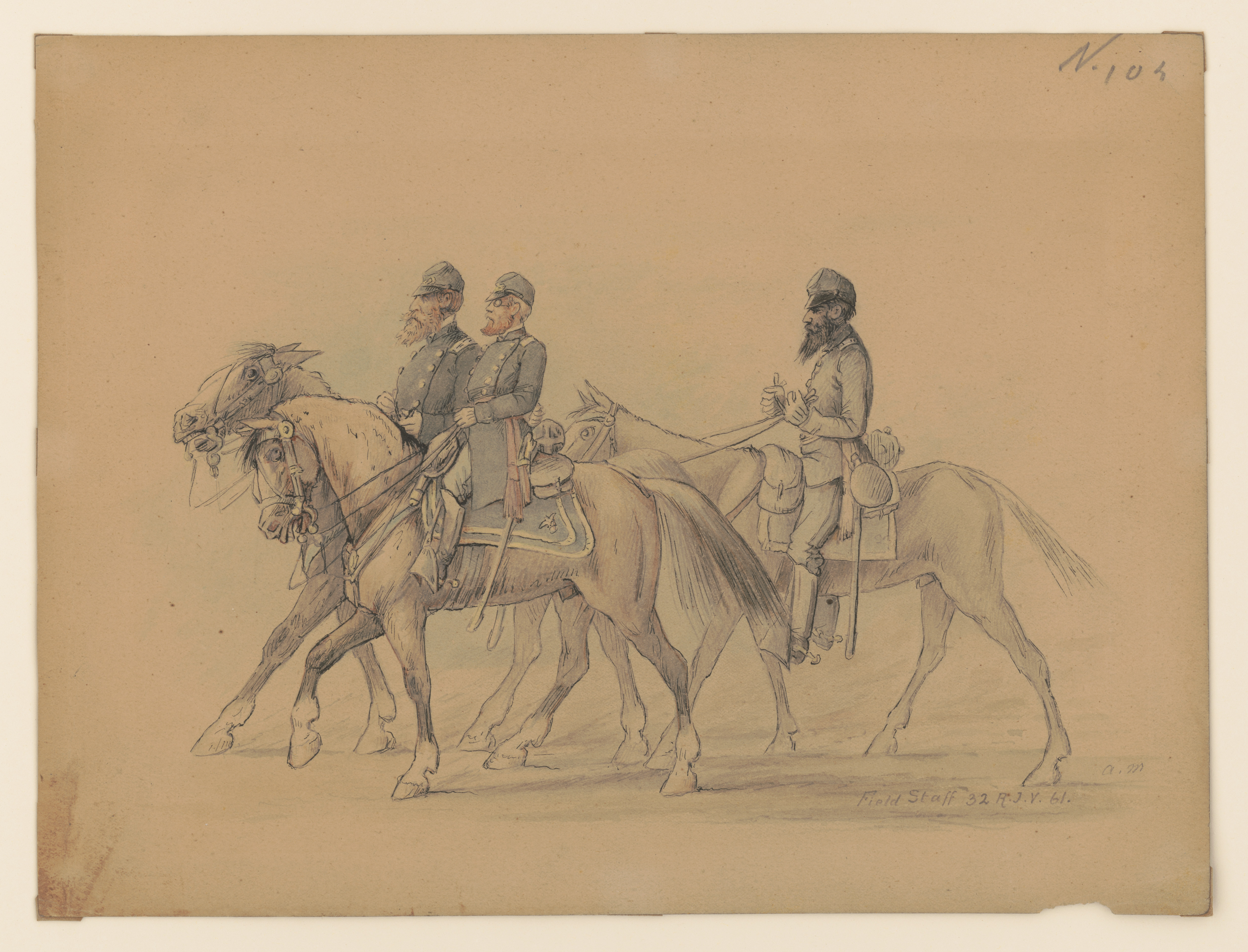
Field staff, 32nd Regiment, Indiana Volunteers by Adolph Metzner

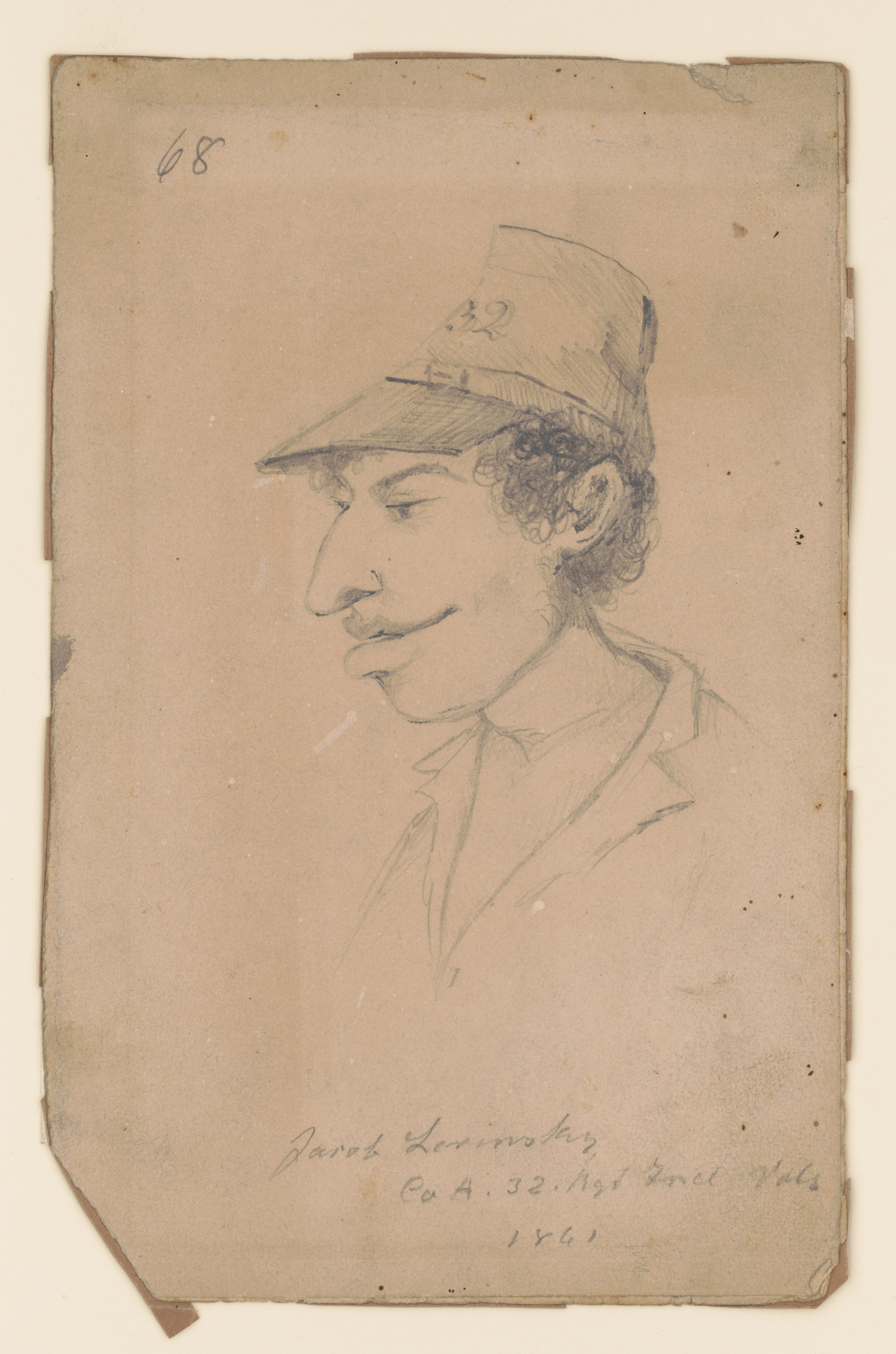
Jacob Labinsky, Company A, 32nd Regiment, Indiana Volunteers "The Camp Comedian", by Adolph Metzner

The 32nd Indiana left Indianapolis for Kentucky in September 1861. In mid-October 1861 the regiment became one of four attached to Brigadier General Richard W. Johnson's 6th Brigade, under Brigadier General Alexander McDowell McCook's first Army of the Ohio. The 32nd Indiana served in the 6th Brigade, Army of the Ohio, to December 1861; the 6th Brigade, 2nd Division, Army of the Ohio, to September 1862; and the 6th Brigade, 2nd Division, 1st Corps, Army of the Ohio, to November 1862. The 32nd Indiana was attached to the 1st Brigade, 2nd Division, Right Wing 14th Army Corps, Army of the Cumberland, from November 1862 to January 1863; and the 1st Brigade, 2nd Division, 20th Army Corps, Army of the Cumberland, to October 1863; and the 1st Brigade, 3rd Division, 4th Army Corps, Army of the Cumberland, to October 1864. The regiment posted at Chattanooga, Tennessee, Department of the Cumberland, until November 1864.

After the regiment's three-year men returned to Indiana in August 1864, its remaining soldiers consolidated into the three companies (A, B, and C). In September 1864 they joined with a fourth company of recent recruits (Company D) to form a battalion. The reorganized 32nd Indiana was attached to the 2nd Brigade, 1st Separate Division, District of the Etowah, Department of the Cumberland, to June 1865, then the 1st Brigade, 3rd Division, 4th Army Corps, to August 1865. The 32nd Indiana served in the Department of Texas until its remaining troops mustered out of service on December 4, 1865.

== Commanders ==
- Col. August Willich
- Lt. Col. Henry von Trebra
- Lt. Col. Francis Erdelmeyer

During July and August 1862, Col. Willich received a promotion and assumed command of the 6th Brigade. The 32nd Indiana remained in Willich's brigade under command of Henry von Trebra, who was promoted to colonel. Francis "Frank" Erdelmeyer assumed command of the regiment after Von Tebra's death.

== Campaigns and battles ==
From its initial formation in August 1861, the regiment became known as one of Indiana's most highly disciplined regiments because of its infantry maneuvers, which were based on Prussian infantry tactics and bugle calls, and the general good health of its men. During 1861 and 1862 the regiment's major engagements included the Battle of Rowlett's Station, the Battle of Shiloh, the Siege of Corinth, and the Battle of Stones River. In 1863 the 32nd Indiana participated in three major campaigns: the Tullahoma Campaign, the Chickamauga Campaign, and the Chattanooga campaign. In 1864 the regiment joined the Atlanta campaign and fought in battles at Resaca, Adairsville, New Hope Church, Dallas, Pickett's Mill, Marietta, Kennesaw Mountain, Peachtree Creek, Atlanta, Jonesborough, and Lovejoy's Station. The 32nd Indiana completed its service in Texas, and mustered out on December 4, 1865.

=== 1861–62 ===
In late September 1861, still 130 men short of a full regiment, the 32nd Indiana was dispatched to Louisville, Kentucky, and was assigned to protect the Louisville and Nashville Railroad. On October 15 the regiment was ordered to Camp Nevin, Kentucky, where it remained until December 9, 1861, protecting workers who were repairing a railroad bridge.

The 32nd Indiana experienced its first major action at the Battle of Rowlett's Station (December 17, 1861), south of Munfordville, Kentucky. The regiment's service at Rowlett's Station became notable as one of the few occasions during the war when Union infantry successfully defended itself in the open against repeated cavalry assaults from the Confederates. The 32nd Indiana received national recognition in the newspapers for its stand against Confederate forces. A detachment from the 32nd Indiana (fewer than 500 men) under Lt. Col. Henry von Trebra fought off 1,300 Confederate troops, including men from Terry's Texas Rangers, Arkansas infantry, and Mississippi artillery under Brig. Gen. Thomas C. Hindman. The outmanned 32nd Indiana infantry successfully repelled the charging Confederate cavalry. The 32nd Indiana's casualties from the battle varied, depending on the source, but the final count was 46 (13 killed, 28 wounded, and 5 captured).The regiment's success in battle with so few casualties has been partially attributed to its thorough training during the early months of the war. After the battle, the 32nd Indiana performed garrison duty and helped with construction projects at Munfordville.

The 32nd Indiana saw action at Battle of Shiloh (April 6−7, 1862). On March 16, 1862, the regiment began its march west to join Ulysses S. Grant's Union Army at Pittsburgh Landing on the Tennessee River, but destroyed bridges along the route slowed its progress. On April 6, 1862, the 32nd Indiana heard artillery fire in the distance and quickly prepared for the 20-mile (32 km) march to the battlefield, arriving on the eastern shore of the river, opposite Pittsburgh Landing, to witness the aftermath of the day's fighting. On April 7, the regiment crossed the river to join McCook's division on the battlefield. During the second day of battle, Col. Willich displayed his leadership abilities when his troops became unsteady under heavy fire. After ordering the 32nd Indiana to assemble in a double column facing the enemy, Willich took up a position on horseback in the front of the formation, with his back to the enemy, and drilled his men until they regained their composure. Once the 32nd Indiana had recovered its stability, it advanced with the 77th Pennsylvania to prevent the Confederates from attacking the Union line. The 32nd Indiana suffered 119 casualties, including 19 dead, at Shiloh.

In the months following Shiloh, the 32nd Indiana took part in the advance on Confederate troops at Corinth, Mississippi; the Siege of Corinth (April 29–May 30); and Don Carlos Buell's campaign in northern Alabama and middle Tennessee (June to August 1862). In early October 1862 the regiment pursued Braxton Bragg's Confederate troops into Kentucky (October 1–15), before marching to Nashville, Tennessee, where they remained until December 26, 1862. The regiment took part in the advance on Murfreesboro, Tennessee (December 26–30).

=== 1863–64 ===
The 32nd Indiana fought at the Battle of Stones River (December 30–31, 1862, and January 1–3, 1863). The regiment estimated its casualties at 12 men killed, 40 wounded, and 115 captured. Confederates took the prisoners to Libby Prison at Richmond, Virginia, where they remained until their release as part of prisoner exchanges over the next four months. In the meantime, the 32nd Indiana remained at Murfreesboro.

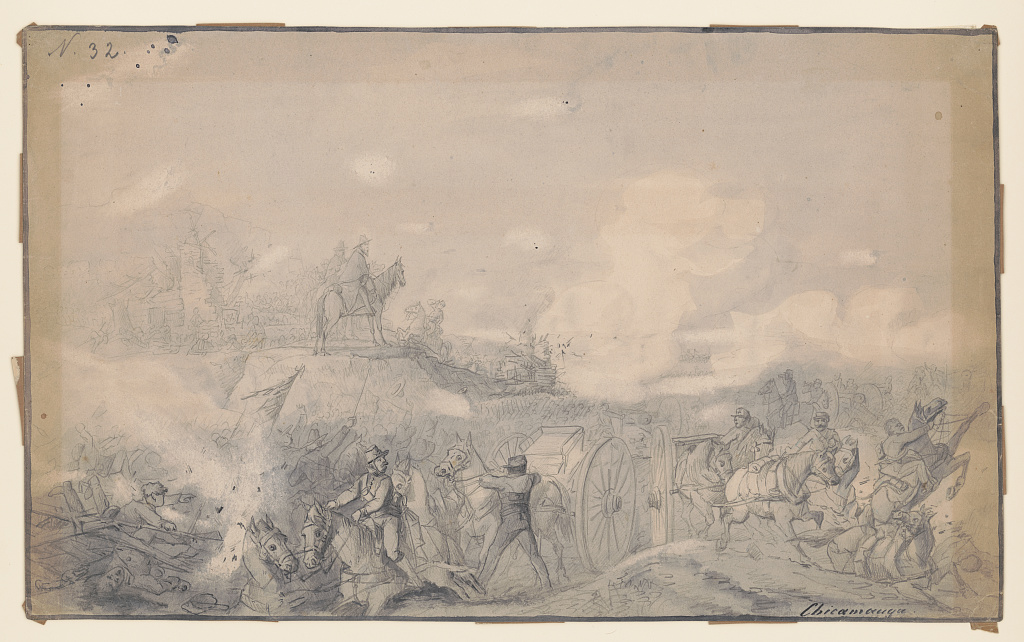
Troops of the Thirty-second Indiana at Chickamauga, September 1863

During 1863 the regiment took part in the Tullahoma Campaign (June 22–July 7), including the Battle of Liberty Gap (June 22–24 and June 24–27), and the Chickamauga Campaign (August 16–September 22), including the Battle of Chickamauga (September 19–20). The regiment's casualties at Chickamauga were 21 dead, 81 wounded, and 20 missing. The 32nd Indiana also participated in the Chattanooga campaign (September 24–November 23), including the fighting at Orchard Knob (November 23–24) and the Battle of Missionary Ridge (November 25). The regiment remained in eastern Tennessee until April 1864.

In May 1864 the 32nd Indiana joined William T. Sherman’s Atlanta campaign (May 1–September 8, 1864) and fought at the Battle of Rocky Face Ridge (May 8–13); the Battle of Resaca (May 14–15); the Battle of Adairsville (May 17); the advance on Dallas (May 22–25); in battles around New Hope Church, Dallas, and Allatoona Hills (May 25–June 5); and at the Battle of Pickett's Mill (May 27). The 32nd Indiana also fought at the Battle of Marietta (June 10–July 2), the Battle of Kennesaw Mountain (June 27), and the Battle of Peachtree Creek (July 19–20), before taking part in the Battle of Atlanta (July 22–August 25, 1864).

On August 2, 1864, the regiment's three-year enlisted men were ordered to Indiana, where they were scheduled to muster out of service. En route to Indianapolis these soldiers took part in an expedition from Mount Vernon, Indiana, into Kentucky, (August 16–22, 1864) that included skirmishes at White Oak Springs (August 17), Gouger's Lake (August 18), and Smith's Mills (August 19). They mustered out of service at Indianapolis on September 7, 1864.

=== After consolidation ===
About 285 men whose mustering into service dated after 1862 remained in the 32nd Indiana and consolidated into a battalion garrisoned at Chattanooga, Tennessee. The reorganized 32nd Indiana took part in the Battle of Jonesborough (August 31–September 1, 1864) and the Battle of Lovejoy's Station (September 2–6, 1864). In mid-June 1865, new orders moved the 32nd Indiana to New Orleans, Louisiana, and in July 1865 to Texas, where it served at Green Lake and San Antonio, before its remaining soldiers mustered out of service on December 4, 1865.

== Casualties ==
Of the 905 original members of the 32nd Indiana who left Indianapolis in 1861, 281 returned three years later to muster out of service; 89 men were mustered out "in absentia." The total number of casualties reported for the regiment is 278, which includes 7 officers and 174 enlisted men killed and mortally wounded, and 1 officer and 96 enlisted men who died from disease.

== Tributes ==
August Bloedner, a private in the 32nd Indiana from Cincinnati, Ohio, to commemorate his comrades who died at the Battle of Rowlett's Station in December 1861. Dedicated in 1862, the 32nd Indiana Monument is generally considered to be the oldest surviving monument of the American Civil War. It was installed in the Frazier History Museum lobby, Louisville, Kentucky, in August 2010.

Adolph G. Metzner, a German-born pharmacist who immigrated to the United States in 1856 and served in the 32nd Indiana from August 1861 to September 1864, made numerous sketches and drawings during his wartime service with the regiment. His illustrations, which were published in Blood Shed in This War, provide a visual record of the 32nd Indiana’s camp life and battle experiences as well as his impressions of the people, places, and major events the regiment encountered during the war.

Francis Erdelmeyer, Colonel and commander of the 32nd Indiana Infantry Regiment from 1863-1864. Erdelmeyer was a German-born immigrant to Indianapolis who worked in the upholstery trade before the war. Erdelmeyer had previously served as the Sergeant of Company E of the 11th Indiana Infantry Regiment in 1861 for three months before re-enlisting in the 32nd Indiana.

== See also ==
Horn Brigade

- List of Indiana Civil War regiments
- Indiana in the Civil War
- 32nd Indiana Monument
