= Vine Street, Cincinnati =

Street in Cincinnati, Ohio, United States

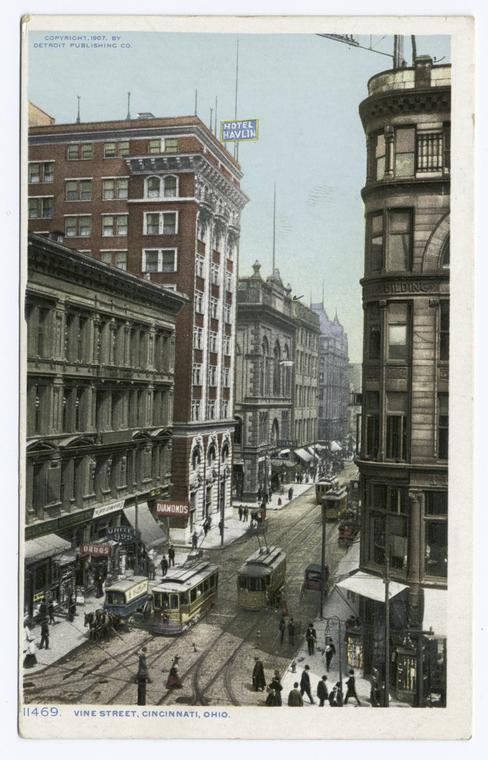
Vine Street in 1907.

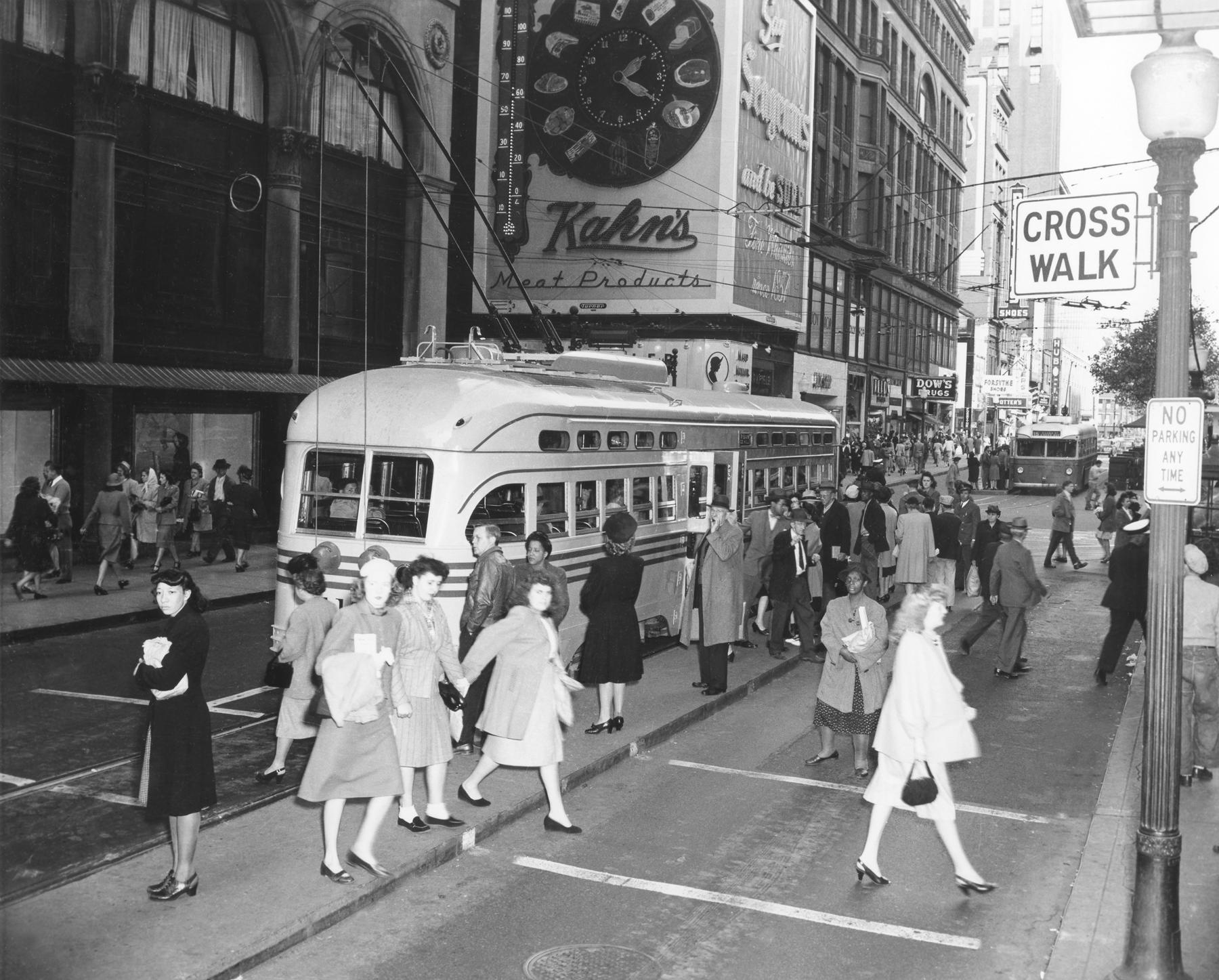
Busy scene on Vine at 5th circa the early 1940s, with streetcar and Kahn's clock. Every building depicted in the photo has since been demolished.

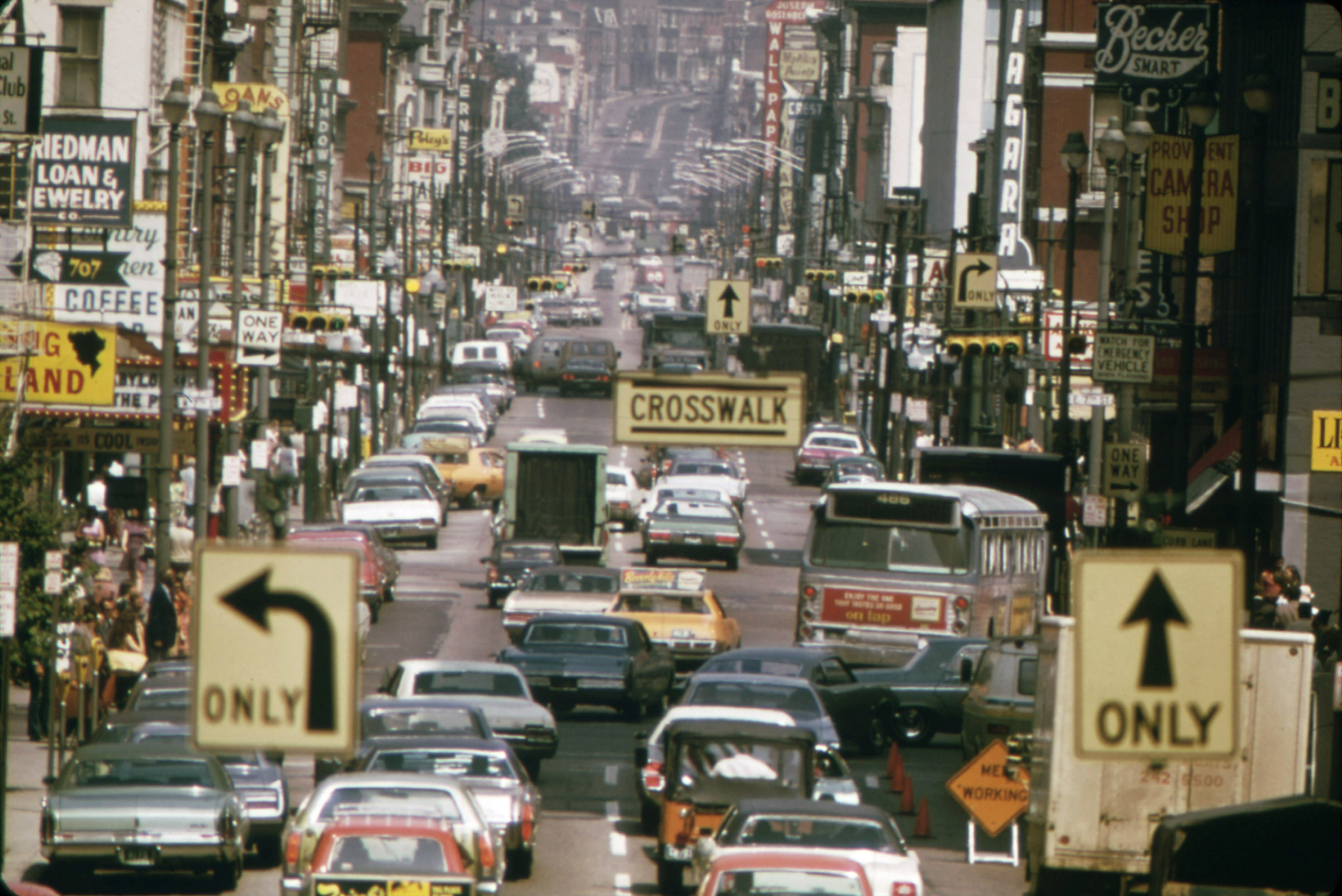
Vine Street in 1973.

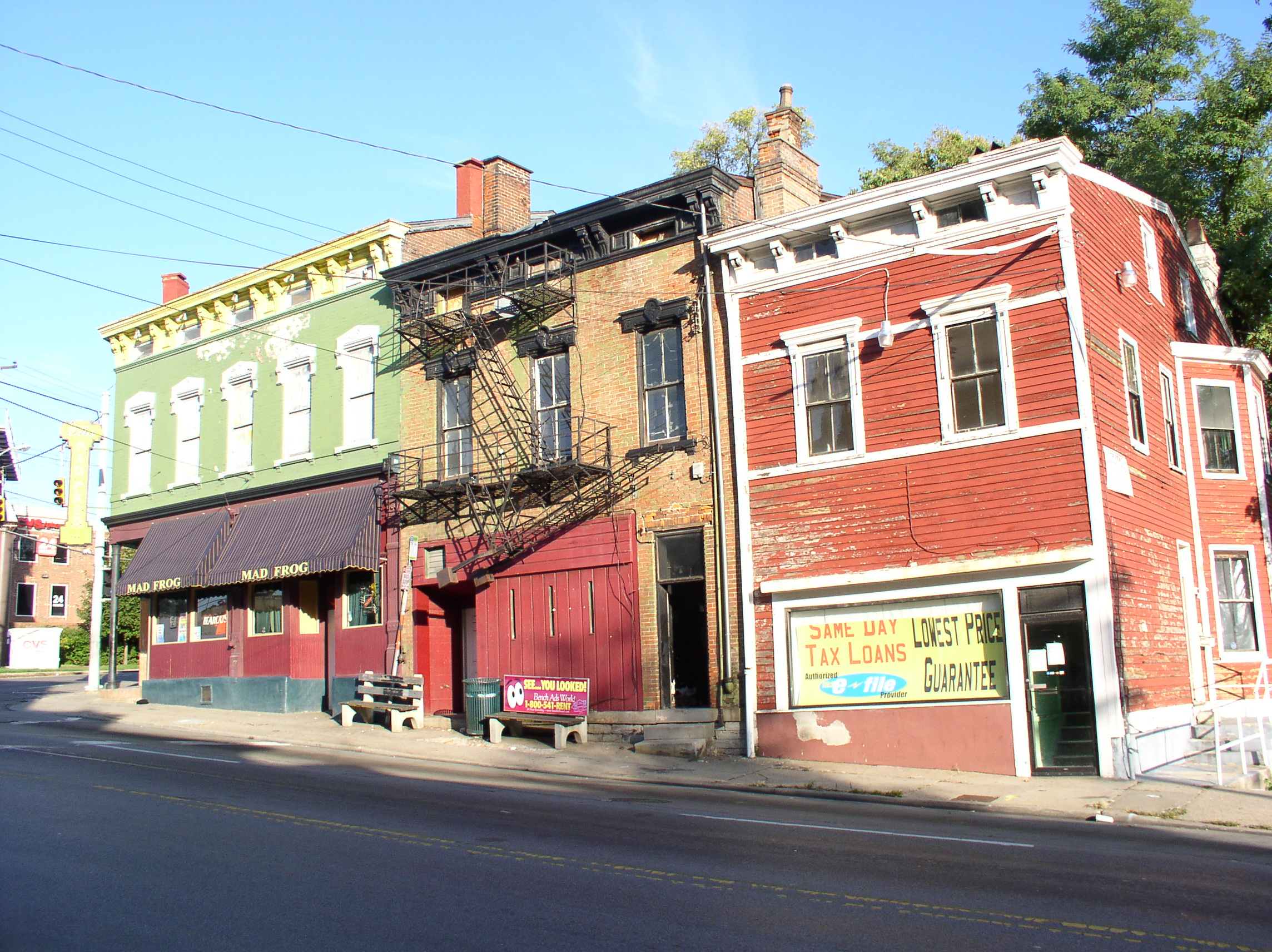
Corner of Vine Street and McMillan St in 2009.

Vine Street functions as Cincinnati's central thoroughfare. It bisects the downtown neighborhood, as well as the adjacent Over-the-Rhine neighborhood. The street also serves as the dividing line for the "east" and "west" sides of the city. All east-west addresses in the city start at zero at Vine Street.

It heads mostly north-northeast from the riverfront area through the Over-the-Rhine neighborhood, ascending between Clifton Heights and Mount Auburn until it courses the uptown plateau past the University of Cincinnati. As the eastern perimeter of the campus and the Environmental Protection Agency's regional offices, Vine is called Jefferson Avenue, though it directly connects with Vine Street on its north and south ends. An adjunct, known as Short Vine, essentially parallels Jefferson Avenue and functions as a central artery of the neighborhood of Corryville, an off-campus business district with a number of shops, music venues, and restaurants.

Vine Street and Jefferson Avenue were both realigned in the 1970s to provide a bypass around the Corryville Neighborhood Business District. Previously, Vine St and Short Vine formed a five-leg intersection with Auburn Avenue and East and West Corry Streets. The south legs of Vine and North leg of Auburn were removed to make room for a commercial shopping center. However, Vine St and Short Vine still divide the east and west sides of Cincinnati. The Jefferson Avenue "bypass" is still on the west side of the city. The north end of Short Vine connects to Vine Street at the Martin Luther King, Jr. Drive intersection.

Vine Street (north of Jefferson) descends past the Cincinnati Zoo and the Vine Street Hill Cemetery. Near the bottom of Vine Street Hill, the street leaves the City of Cincinnati and takes a northwestern heading through the independent entities of Saint Bernard, Ohio, home of Ivorydale (Manufacturing heart of Procter & Gamble). In Saint Bernard, it passes beneath the Mill Creek Expressway, as this segment of Interstate 75 is known. After a railroad crossing near Ivorydale, it meets Spring Grove Avenue.

Vine Street then enters Elmwood Place and serves as the municipality's central boulevard. Vine continues in a northerly direction through the Cincinnati city neighborhood of Carthage, where it merges with Ohio State Route 4 at the terminus of Paddock Road. The Ronald Reagan Cross County Highway crosses over Vine Street. Passing on through the Cincinnati neighborhood of Hartwell, Vine Street then becomes Springfield Pike when it enters Wyoming, Ohio. Springfield Pike continues through Woodlawn, Ohio. At the north end of Woodlawn, entering Glendale, Ohio, there is a fork in the road. Ohio State Route 4 and Springfield Pike veer off to the left towards downtown Springdale, Ohio, while Ohio State Route 747 continues straight north as Congress Avenue through Glendale, and later as Princeton Pike into Springdale near the former Tri-County Mall.

Most of the buildings on Vine Street are commercial, and represent the city's historic business district. Vine Street is also known for its large amount of pedestrian traffic, particularly around Fountain Square.

== Places of interest ==
- Fountain Square
- Cincinnati Zoo
- University of Cincinnati
- Corporate Headquarters of Kroger
- Over-the-Rhine Neighborhood
- Bogart's Marquee
- Vine Street Hill Cemetery
- Main Branch of Cincinnati Public Libraries
