= Francis Erdelmeyer =

Indiana military officer

Colonel Francis W. Erdelmeyer
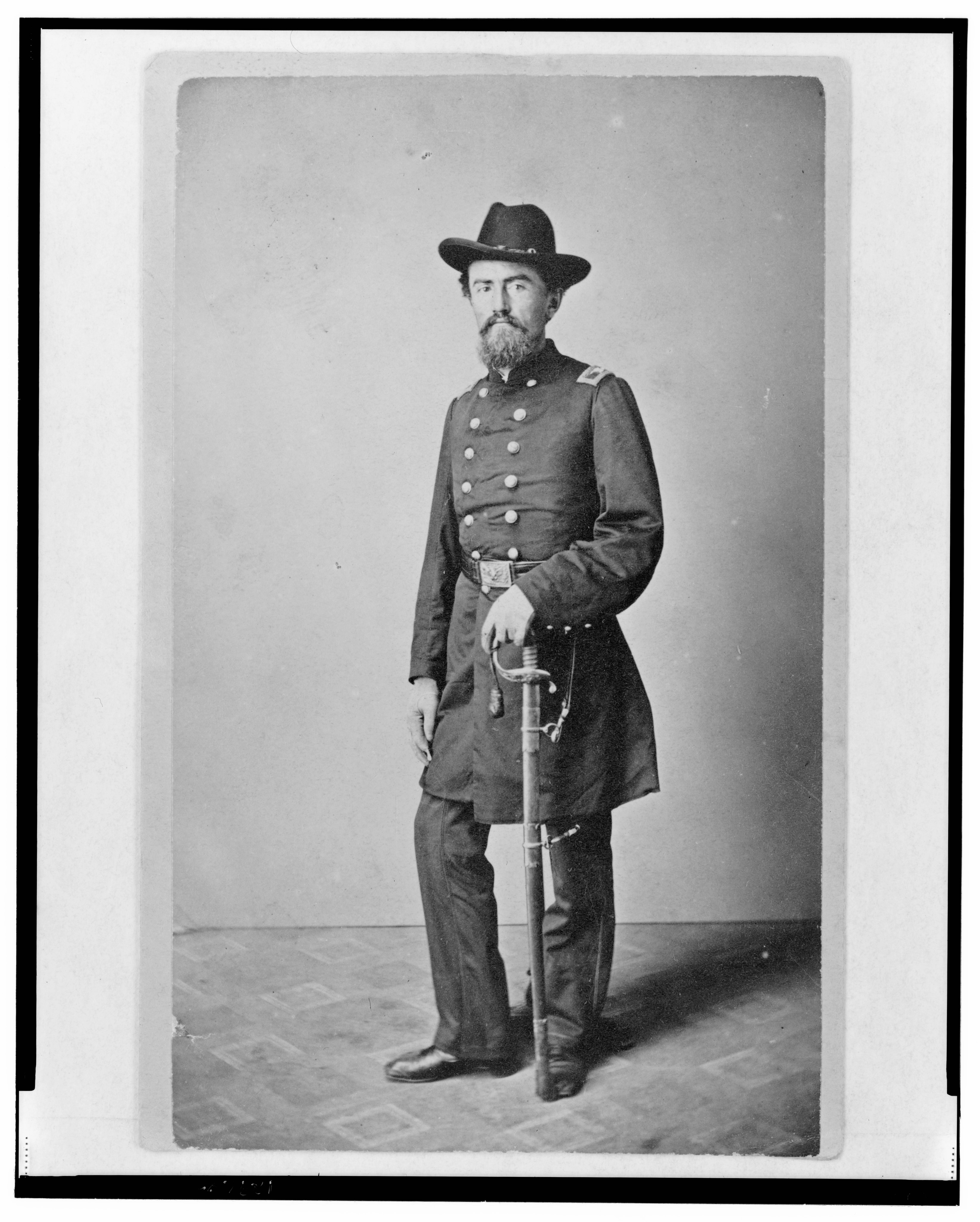
- Erdelmeyer in 1861

Treasurer of Marion County, Indiana
- In office 1869–1871

Personal details
- Born: November 2, 1835 Worms, Germany
- Died: October 16, 1926 (aged 90) Indianapolis, Indiana
- Resting place: Crown Hill Cemetery; Indianapolis, Indiana

Military service
- Allegiance: United States of America
- Branch/service: (United States) Union Army
- Years of service: 1861–1864
- Rank: Colonel
- Unit: Company E, 11th Indiana Infantry Regiment; Company A, 32nd Indiana Infantry Regiment
- Commands: 32nd Indiana Infantry Regiment
- Battles/wars: American Civil War

Francis "Frank" W. Erdelmeyer (November 2, 1835 – October 16, 1926) was a German-American Turner, businessman, upholsterer, pharmacist, and American Civil War veteran who lived in Indianapolis, Indiana. During his service from 1861 to 1864 in the Union Army, Erdelmeyer served in both the 11th Indiana Infantry Regiment under Lew Wallace and later commanded the 32nd Indiana Infantry Regiment. Erdelmeyer was later involved in the creation of the German-English School Society (1849–1882) of Indianapolis and was elected as the treasurer of Marion County in 1869.

== Early life ==
Francis W. Erdelmeyer was born on November 2, 1835, in Herrnsheim in the German city of Worms, then part of the Grand Duchy of Hesse. Erdelmeyer emigrated to New York in 1852 before later settling in Indianapolis by 1858. While in Indianapolis he worked in the upholstery trade under John Ott Sr. of the Ott Lounge Company and belonged to the local Turner club, the Turngemeinde (Gymnastic Society/ Union). The Turngemeinde was one of the two major Turner Halls in Indianapolis alongside the Indianapolis Socialistisher Turnverein.

== Military service ==
A sketch of Captain Erdelmeyer at Camp Nevin, Kentucky by Adolph G. Metzner c.1861

At the outbreak of the American Civil War Erdelmeyer volunteered for service as a Sergeant in the 11th Indiana Infantry Regiment initially only for 3-months service. Erdelmeyer served in Company E of the 11th Indiana under Captain Dewitt Clinton Rugg. Rugg was later the commander of the 48th Indiana Infantry Regiment. The 11th Indiana Infantry Regiment was initially nicknamed "Wallace's Zouaves" after the regiment's Colonel and commander Lew Wallace.

At the expiration of his initial enlistment in July 1861, Erdelmeyer re-enlisted into the Union Army after raising a company of infantry in Indianapolis nicknamed the "Turner Company" on August 24, 1861, from the local Turnverein. Erdelmeyer's company would form the bulk of Company A of the newly raised 32nd Indiana Infantry Regiment – also known as the "1st German" regiment – under the command of the German Revolutionary and Forty-eighter, August Willich.

Lieutenant Colonel Erdelmeyer, November 14, 1862, by Adolph G. Metzner

Erdelmeyer was promoted to Lieutenant Colonel on October 20, 1862. Following Willich's promotion to Brigadier General, Heinrich "Henry" von Trebra would replace Willich as commander. Trebra later died on August 7, 1863, in Arcola, Illinois, from typhoid fever. Erdelmeyer was promoted to the rank of Colonel the following day.

Erdelmeyer would command the regiment until the end of the war through some of the regiment's bloodiest actions including; the Battle of Chickamauga, Orchard Knob, the Battle of Missionary Ridge, the Battle of Rocky Face Ridge, the Battle of Resaca, the Battle of Adairsville, the Battle of New Hope Church, the Battle of Dallas, the Battle of Pickett's Mill, the Battle of Marietta, the Battle of Kennesaw Mountain, the Battle of Peachtree Creek, the Battle of Atlanta, the Battle of Jonesborough, and the Battle of Lovejoy's Station. Erdelmeyer mustered out with the rest of the regiment on September 7, 1864.

== Postwar ==
In 1865 following the war Erdelmeyer was an early subscriber and advocate of the German-English School Society and pledged $5 and later $25 to the schools construction and various programs. In August 1869 Erdelmeyer was elected as the Marion County Treasurer. According to his 1926 obituary in the Indianapolis Times, Erdelmeyer was a Freemason and an active member in both the Grand Army of the Republic and the Military Order of the Loyal Legion of the United States. Erdelmeyer was a member of the Center Lodge No. 23 located in Indianapolis since 1857.

=== Assassination attempt ===
In October 1900 Erdelmeyer was involved in a drugstore shooting by a patron named Frank Bohren while at his business located at 1020 College Avenue in Indianapolis. Bohren, operator at the American Press Association Office, had recently been involved in a divorce with his wife Vernic Fisher who consistently called Erdelmeyer's pharmacy so often that Erdelmeyer requested that she stop calling. Bohren, suspected Erdelmeyer and his wife of infidelity without further investigation and plotted to kill Erdelmeyer. Luckily, Erdelmeyer spotted Bohren's revolver in-time to wrestle it out of his hands, one bullet however, struck Erdelmeyer in his knee, another struck Bohren in his hand. Erdelmeyer survived the altercation, Bohren was later arrested for manslaughter with intent to kill.

== Personal life and death ==
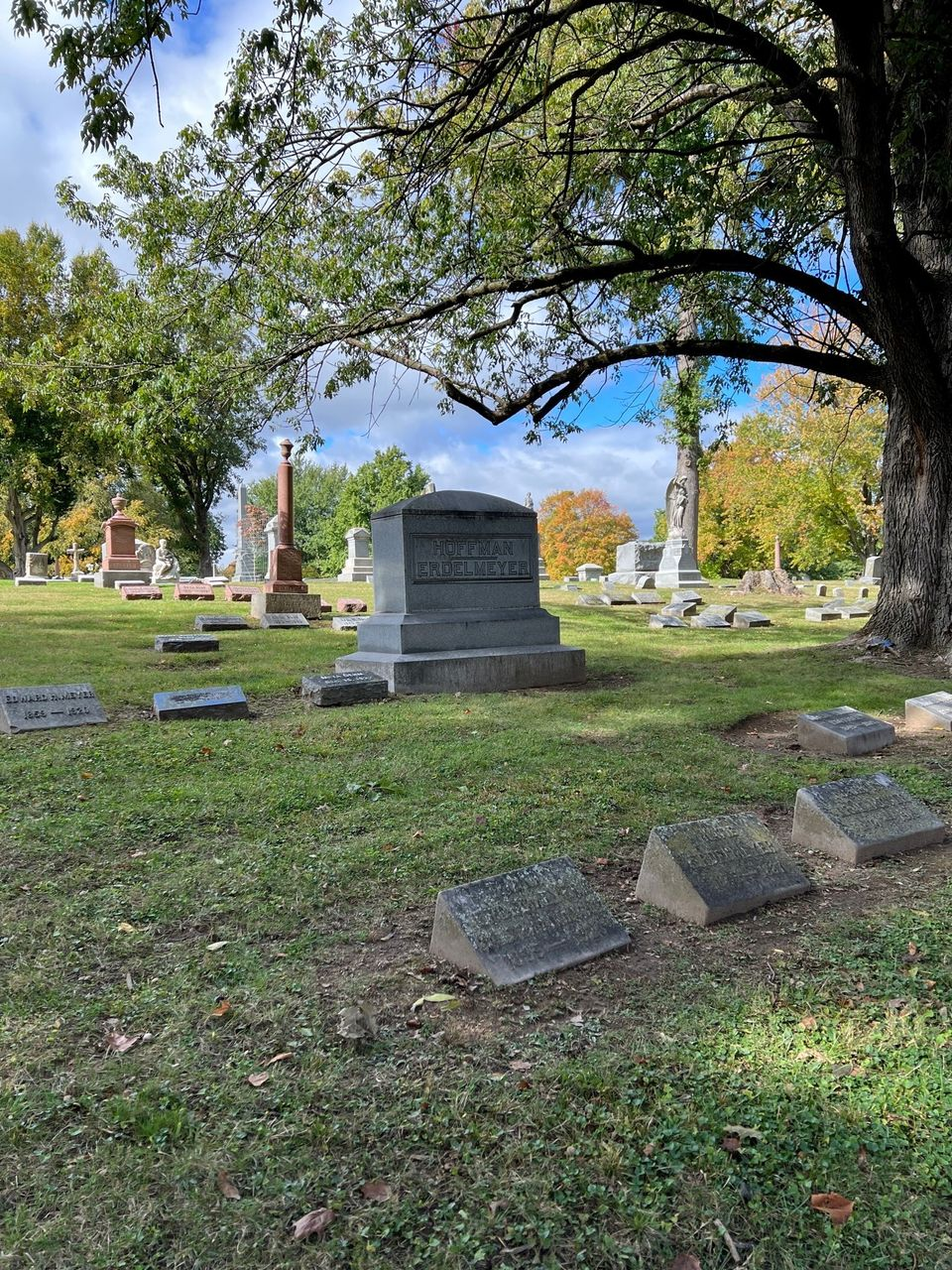
The grave of Francis Erdelmeyer located at Crown Hill Cemetery

Erdelmeyer was married to Catharine "Katie" Hoffman, together the Erdelmeyer's had three children. Erdelmeyer's grandson was Lieutenant Frank Buschmann who served in the Indiana National Guard Artillery Battery A of Indianapolis who served during World War I. Erdelmeyer died on October 16, 1926, in Indianapolis. He is buried at Crown Hill Cemetery and is located in Section 12, Lot 35.
