= Battery A, 1st Kentucky Light Artillery =

Battery "A" Kentucky Light Artillery
- Active: September 27, 1861 to November 17, 1865
- Country: United States
- Allegiance: Union
- Branch: Artillery
- Engagements: Siege of Corinth; Battle of Perryville; Battle of Stones River; Tullahoma Campaign; Battle of Chickamauga; Second Battle of Franklin; Battle of Nashville

Battery "A" 1st Kentucky Light Artillery was an artillery battery that served in the Union Army during the American Civil War. It was often referred to as Stone's Battery.

== Service ==
The battery was organized at Camp Joe Holt from the Louisville Legion and mustered in at Camp Muldraugh's Hill for a three-year enlistment on September 27, 1861, under the command of Captain David C. Stone.

The battery was attached to Rousseau's Brigade, McCook's Command at Nolin, to December 1861. Artillery, 2nd Division, Army of the Ohio, to August 1862. 28th Brigade, 3rd Division, Army of the Ohio, to October 1862. Artillery, 3rd Division, III Corps, Army of the Ohio, to November 1862. 3rd Brigade, 1st Division, Center, XIV Corps, Army of the Cumberland, to January 1863. Artillery, 1st Division, XIV Corps, Army of the Cumberland, to October 1863. Unassigned, Army of the Cumberland, to December 1863. Post of Murfreesboro, Tennessee, Department of the Cumberland, to March 1864. 2nd Division, Artillery Reserve, Department of the Cumberland, to November 1864. Artillery Brigade, IV Corps, to August 1865. Department of Texas to November 1865.

Battery "A" 1st Kentucky Light Artillery mustered out of service on November 17, 1865.

== Detailed service ==
Moved to Muldraugh's Hill, Ky., September 17, 1861. At Camp Muldraugh's Hill and Nolin until February 1862. Advance on Bowling Green, Ky., and Nashville, Tenn., February 10-March 2. March to Savannah, Tenn., March 16-April 7. Advance on and siege of Corinth, Miss., April 29-May 30. Buell's Campaign in northern Alabama and middle Tennessee June to August. March to Louisville, Ky., in pursuit of Bragg August 20-September 26. Pursuit of Bragg into Kentucky October 1–16. Battle of Perryville, Ky., October 8. March to Nashville, Tenn., October 16-November 7, and duty there till December 26. Advance on Murfreesboro, Tenn., December 26–30. Jefferson December 30. Battle of Stones River December 30–31, 1862 and January 1–3, 1863. At Murfreesboro till June. Expedition to McMinnville March 20–30. Tullahoma Campaign June 23-July 7. Hoover's Gap June 24–26. Occupation of Tullahoma July 1. Occupation of middle Tennessee till August 16. Passage of Cumberland Mountains and Tennessee River, and Chickamauga Campaign August 16-September 22. Davis Cross Roads, near Dug Gap, September 11. Battle of Chickamauga September 19–21. At Murfreesboro, Tenn., till March 1864, and at Nashville, Tenn., as Garrison Artillery, until November 1864. Nashville Campaign November–December. Columbia, Duck River, November 24–27. Battle of Franklin, November 30. Battle of Nashville, December 15–16. Warfield's, near Columbia, December 23. At Huntsville, Ala., until March 1865. Expedition to Bull's Gap and operations in eastern Tennessee March 15-April 22. At Nashville till June. Moved to New Orleans, thence to Texas June–July. Duty at San Antonio, Texas, and at Victoria, Texas, until November.

== Casualties ==
The battery lost a total of 32 men during service; 10 enlisted men killed or mortally wounded, 1 officer and 21 enlisted men died of disease.

== Commanders ==
- Captain David C. Stone
- Captain Theodore S. Thomasson

== See also ==
- List of Kentucky Civil War Units
- Kentucky in the Civil War
