= 32nd Indiana Monument =

US Civil War monument

- August Bloedner Monument
- Formerly listed on the U.S. National Register of Historic Places
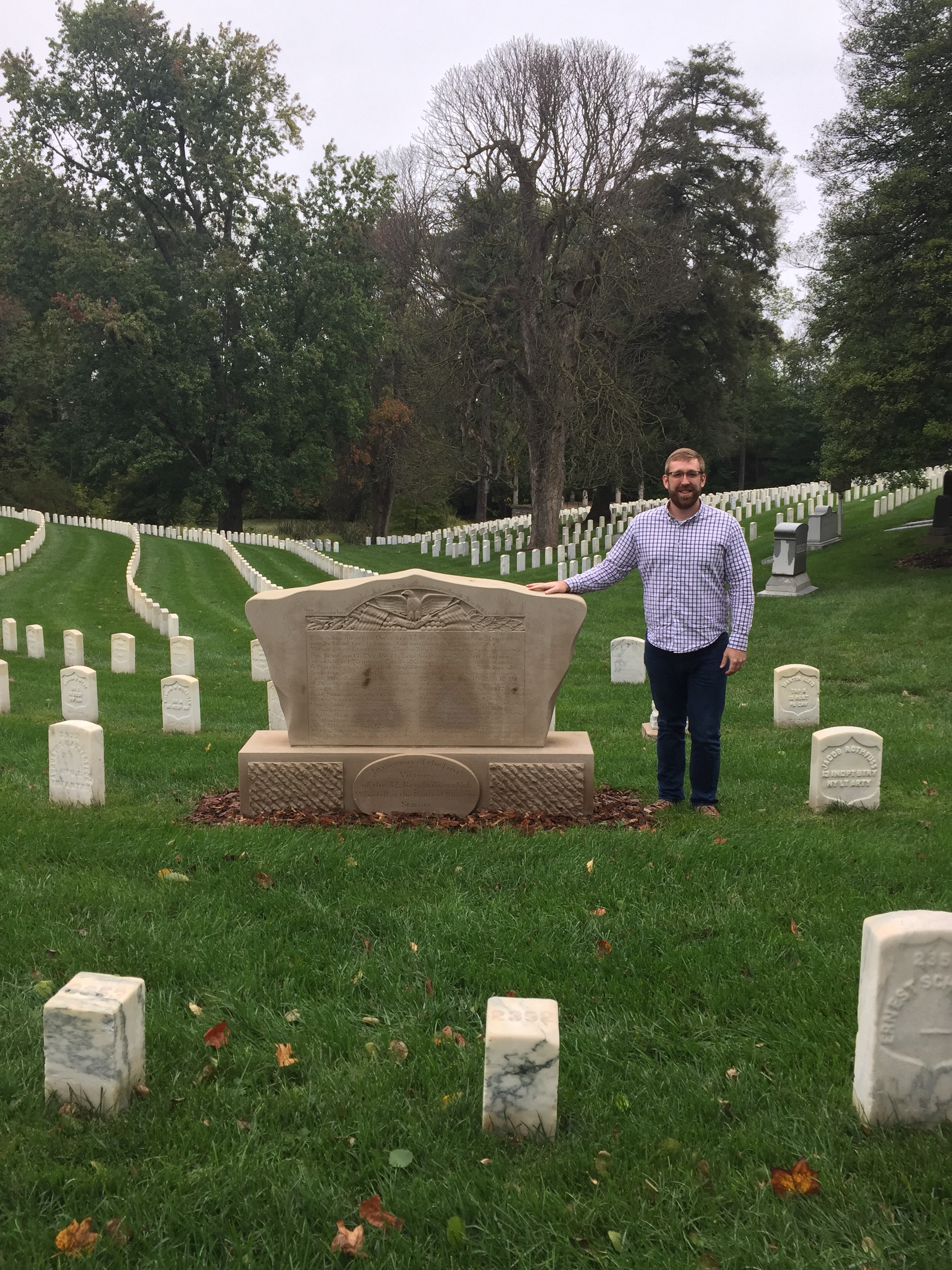
- The Monument, during restoration
- Location: Louisville, Kentucky
- Built: December 1861 or January 1862
- Architect: August Bloedner
- MPS: Civil War Monuments of Kentucky MPS
- NRHP reference No.: 97000688

Significant dates
- Added to NRHP: July 17, 1997
- Removed from NRHP: November 19, 2010

The 32nd Indiana Monument, also known as the August Bloedner Monument, honors the Union soldiers of the 32nd Indiana Volunteer Infantry Regiment, also known as Indiana's "1st German" regiment, who died in the Battle of Rowlett's Station on December 17, 1861, near Munfordville, Kentucky. Originally placed at Fort Willich, near Munfordville, in January 1862, the monument was moved to Cave Hill National Cemetery at Louisville, Kentucky, in June 1867. Due to its fragile condition, the monument was removed from the national cemetery in 2008. After undergoing conservation treatment at the University of Louisville, it was placed on display at the Frazier History Museum lobby in August 2010. Although it is no longer in its original location, the 32nd Indiana Monument is generally considered to be the oldest surviving memorial to the American Civil War. A replacement monument at Cave Hill National Cemetery was dedicated in December 2011.

== History ==
On December 17, 1861, the 32nd Indiana Volunteer Infantry Regiment experienced its first major action during the American Civil War at the Battle of Rowlett's Station, south of Munfordville, Kentucky. Its efforts to successfully defend a crucial bridge received national recognition in the newspapers for its stand against Confederate forces. The battle became notable as one of the few occasions during the war when the Union infantry successfully defended itself in the open against repeated Confederate cavalry assaults. The 32nd Indiana's battle casualties were 46 (13 killed, 28 wounded, and 5 captured).

Shortly after the battle, Christian Friedrich August Bloedner of Cincinnati, Ohio, who served as a Union private in the 32nd Indiana, carved a limestone memorial to honor his comrades who had died. The monument was placed at the Union soldiers' gravesite at Fort Willich, near Munfordville, Kentucky, in mid-January 1862. In June 1867, after Cave Hill National Cemetery was established at Louisville, Kentucky, the monument and the remains of 21 Union soldiers, 14 of them from the 32nd Indiana, were moved from the Cemetery at Fort Willich to the national cemetery.

On July 17, 1997, the 32nd Indiana Monument was added to the National Register of Historic Places. The porous limestone monument has been severely damaged over time by artificial pollutants and natural weathering, and most of the original inscription has faded away. A wooden structure was erected to protect the monument from further decay. Due to its deteriorating condition, the monument was removed from the national cemetery in December 2008 for conservation treatment at the University of Louisville. Conservation Solutions, Inc. (CSI), who treated the monument, recommended that it should be removed to an indoor display. Conservation methods included "cleaning, re-attaching flaking and spalled stone surfaces, removal of inappropriate patch materials and patching".

Due to its fragile condition, one plan to preserve the monument suggested that it be moved indoors to the Hart County Historical Society Museum in Munfordville, with granite copies placed at Cave Hill National Cemetery and at its original location at Fort Willich. In addition to the Hart County museum, the Frazier History Museum at Louisville and the Patton Museum at Fort Knox, Kentucky, vied to display the monument after conservation efforts were completed. The Frazier History Museum was selected to house the monument on long-term loan from the National Cemetery Administration. In August 2010 the refurbished monument was installed in the museum's lobby, where visitors need not pay to see it.

On November 19, 2010, the monument was removed from the National Register of Historic Places. A new monument to the 32nd Indiana that contains German and English inscriptions was dedicated at Cave Hill National Cemetery on December 16, 2011.

== Description ==
The monument was originally intended to lie flat on the ground; however, after its move to Cave Hill National Cemetery, it was installed upright on a stone base, a contribution from Louisville's German community. The base measured 16 inches (41 cm) wide, 67 inches (170 cm) long, and 8 inches (20 cm) above ground. The monument weighs 3,500 pounds (1,600 kg).

On the front of the monument, near the top, a relief carving of an eagle clutches a brace of cannon with two stacks of cannonballs paired below. Olive and oak branches border American flags on each side. Below the frieze a stone-carved tablet bears a German inscription and the names of 13 soldiers from the 32nd Indiana who died at the Battle of Rowlett's Station, along with their ranks and birth years.

Although the German inscription is no longer legible, the National Cemetery records inscription, transcribed into English, reads as follows:

HERE REST THE FIRST HEROES OF THE 32ND INDIANA GERMAN REGIMENT WHO LAID DOWN THEIR LIVES FOR PRESERVATION OF THE FREE CONSTITUTION OF THE UNITED STATES OF NORTH AMERICA. THEY WERE KILLED DECEMBER 17, 1861, IN A FIGHT WITH THE REBELS AT ROWLETT'S STATION, KENTUCKY, IN WHICH ONE REGIMENT TEXAS RANGERS, TWO REGIMENTS OF INFANTRY, AND A BATTERY OF SIX CANNON, OVER 3,000 STRONG, WERE DEFEATED BY 500 GERMAN SOLDIERS.

An English inscription on the monument's base reads:

IN MEMORY OF THE FIRST VICTIMS OF THE 32. REG. INDIANA VOL. WHO FELL AT THE BATTLE OF ROWLETTS STATION DECEMBER 17, 1861

== Legacy ==
Although the 32nd Indiana Monument has been moved from its original location, it is generally considered to be the oldest surviving memorial to the American Civil War. The National Park Service considers the Hazen Brigade Monument at Stones River National Battlefield, Tennessee, placed in 1863, a year after the 32nd Indiana Monument's installation at Fort Willich, the oldest intact Civil War monument in the United States. An earlier monument erected after First Battle of Bull Run (1861) in Virginia has not survived.

== See also ==
- Union Monument in Louisville
- Confederate Monument in Louisville
- List of American Civil War monuments in Kentucky
- Indiana in the American Civil War
- Louisville, Kentucky, in the American Civil War
- National Register of Historic Places listings in The Highlands, Louisville, Kentucky
