= Adolph G. Metzner =

American businessman

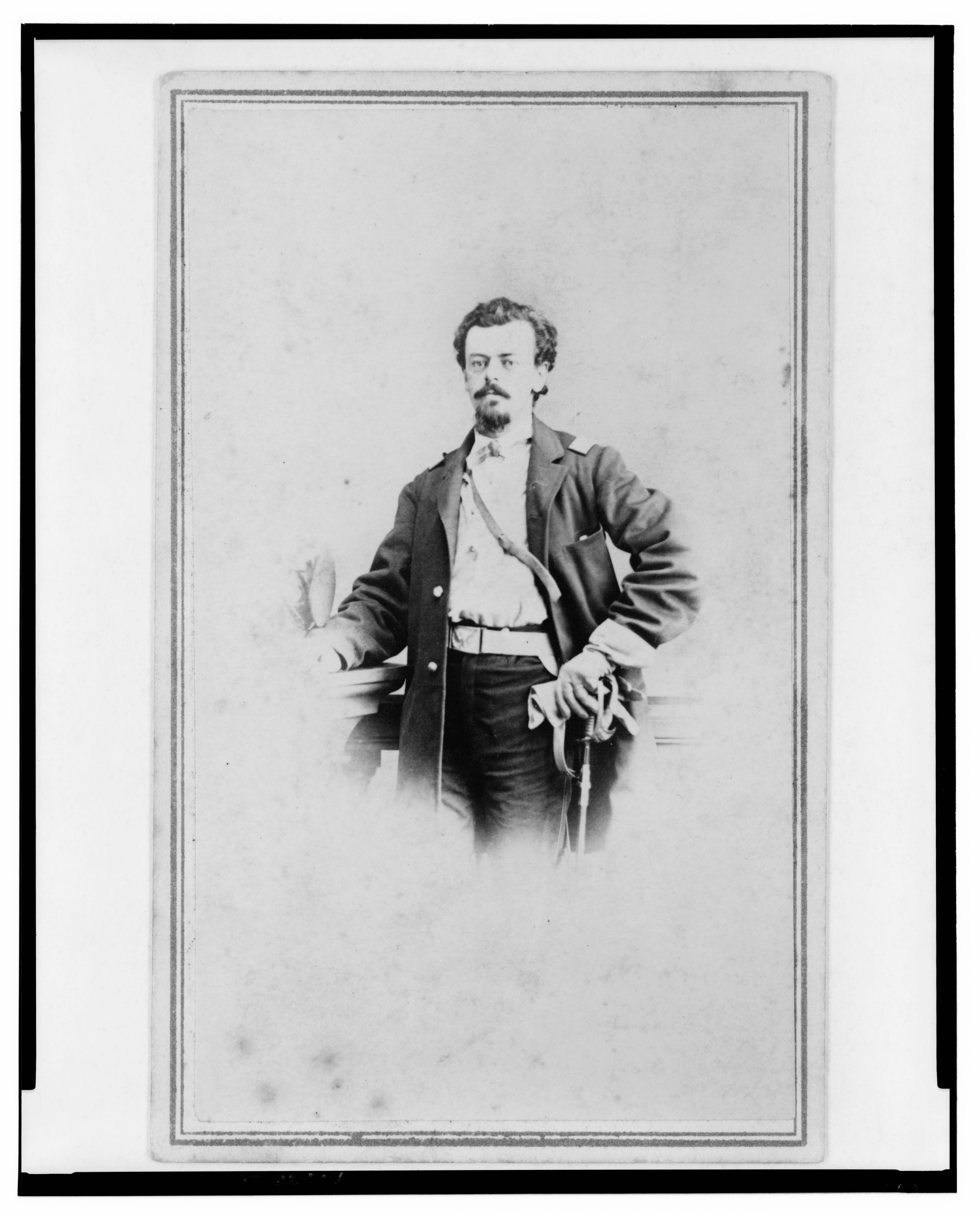
- Born: August 16, 1834; Lörrach, Baden-Württemberg, Germany
- Died: February 13, 1918 (aged 83); Bayonne, New Jersey
- Resting place: Crown Hill Cemetery, Indianapolis, Indiana
- Education: University of Freiburg, Grand Duchy of Baden, Germany
- Occupations: Pharmacist, American Civil War soldier, business entrepreneur
- Spouses: Louise Reutti (d. 1877) Emma Hess (m. 1880)

Adolph G. Metzner was a pharmacist from Lörrach, Grand Duchy of Baden. He immigrated to the United States in 1856 and served as a captain in the Union Army, 32nd Indiana Volunteer Infantry Regiment, during the American Civil War. Metzner co-founded the Metzner and Hatt Tile Company around 1880 at Hamilton, Ohio, and served as its vice president for more than ten years; in 1884 the company was renamed the Hamilton Tile Works. In 1900 he helped reestablish the C. Pardee Works at Perth Amboy, New Jersey. Metzner died in 1918 and is buried at Crown Hill Cemetery in Indianapolis, Indiana.

== Early life and education ==
Metzner was born on August 16, 1834, in the village of Lörrach, Baden-Württemberg, Germany. He attended the University of Freiburg in the Grand Duchy of Baden, Germany, where he earned a degree as a pharmacist. Metzner immigrated to the United States in 1856 and entered into a business partnership as a druggist with Henry J. Stein in Louisville, Kentucky.

== Military service ==
In August 1861 Metzner traveled to Indianapolis, Indiana, where he enlisted for three years of service in the Union Army during the American Civil War. Metzner helped organize Lieutenant Colonel Francis Erdelmeyer's Turner Company, a part of the 32nd Indiana Volunteer Infantry Regiment, also known as Indiana's 1st German Regiment because most of its members were of German descent. Metzner was named First Lieutenant, Company A, 32nd Indiana, effective May 19, 1862; he was promoted to captain on February 4, 1863, and transferred to Company K. During Metzner's term of service from August 1861 until September 1864, his infantry regiment was attached to the first Army of the Ohio and the Army of the Cumberland, and served in the Western Theater.

Metzner and his regiment left Camp Morton in Indianapolis in September 1861 and was ordered to Camp Nevin, Kentucky, in mid-October. The 32nd Indiana's major engagements included the Battle of Rowlett's Station (December 17, 1861), the second day at the Battle of Shiloh (April 7, 1862), and the Battle of Stones River (December 30–31, 1862, and January 1–3, 1863). The 32nd Indiana also participated in the Tullahoma Campaign (June 22–July 7, 1863) and the Chickamauga Campaign (August 16–September 22, 1863), including the Battle of Chickamauga (September 19–20), where Metzner was shot in his right leg. The 32nd Indiana also took part in the Chattanooga campaign (September 24–November 23, 1864) and joined William T. Sherman's Atlanta campaign (May 1–September 8, 1864). The regiment's three-year enlisted men mustered out of service at Indianapolis on September 7, 1864.

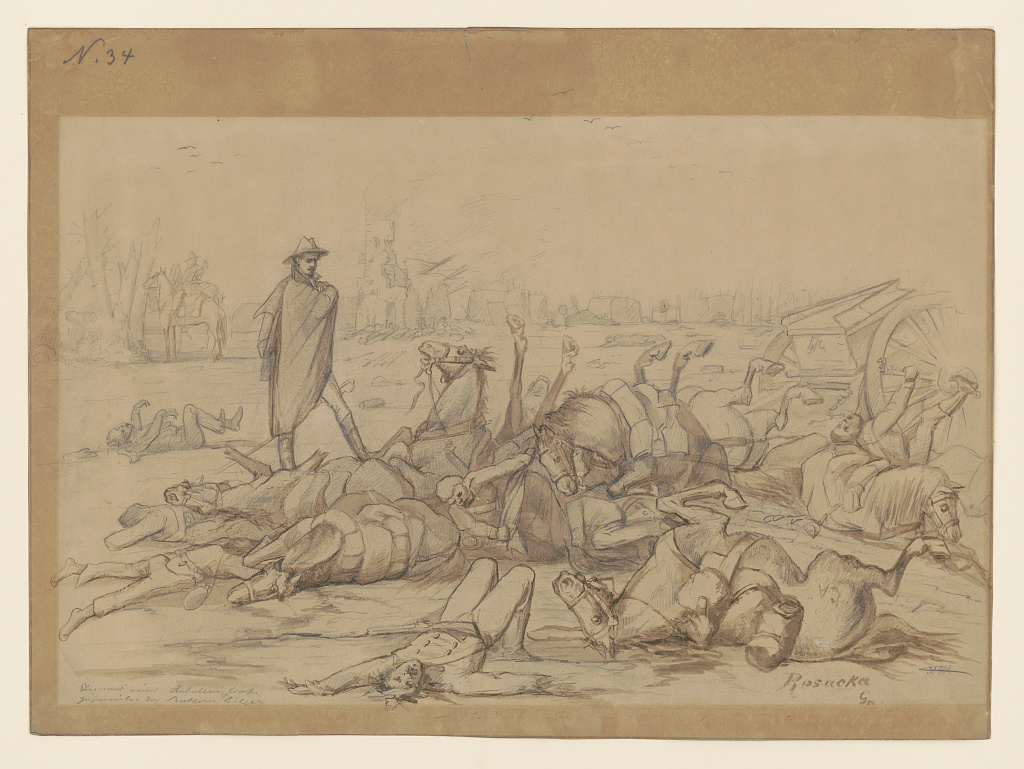
Metzner's graphite and ink wash depiction of a view inside a Confederate fortification at Resaca, Georgia (Battle of Resaca)

Metzner, who achieved the rank of captain during the war, maintained a visual record of his experiences with the 32nd Indiana through numerous sketches. His illustrations included the daily life of the Union soldiers during training, in camp, and in battle. When artists' supplies were unavailable in the field, Metzner used materials such as scraps of cardboard instead of canvas. His training as a pharmacist also may have provided him with the knowledge to produce tints for his drawings from natural sources such as berries and bark. After the Battle of Stones River, Metzner was assigned as a topographical engineer with the 2nd Division, Army of the Cumberland, where artists' materials were more readily available for sketching during his idle hours. Upon his return to Indianapolis in 1864, Metzner created at least one oil painting from his wartime sketches. An 18.5 inches (47 cm) by 23.25 inches (59.1 cm) oil on canvas scene of artillerymen in battle was Metzner's last known work before he pursued other interests.

== Marriage and family ==
Metzner's first wife, Louise Reutti, suffered from kidney disease and died on January 27, 1877; he married his second wife, Emma Hess, on August 16, 1880, at Indianapolis. At the time of his death in 1918, Metzner was survived by his wife, Emma, and six of his children. One son, Adolph, from his first marriage, died in infancy.

== Career ==
After completion of his military service in 1864, Metzner returned to civilian life at Indianapolis. In 1865 he partnered with Frank Erdelmeyer, his former Union Army commander, to open A. Metzner and Company, a local pharmacy. In 1868 Metzner sold his interest in the business to Erdelmeyer, and opened another drugstore closer to his home. Around the same time, Metzner became interested in developing glazes for pottery and tile as a hobby. Following his first wife's death in 1877, Metzner left the pharmacy business, but continued his work on developing glazes and ceramic artwork.

Around 1880 Metzner learned through his family friends that the Royal Pottery Company in Hamilton, Ohio, was for sale. With a partner he purchased the company, its stock, and kilns, to found the Metzner and Hatt Tile Company, and relocated with his family to Hamilton. In partnership with Jacob Louis Bieler, an Indianapolis brewer, Metzner and his sons, Otto and Max, continued to perfect a technique to produce high quality enameled artistic tile and ceramic glazes. In 1884 Metzner and his new partners, Dr. Theodore Wild of Chicago, who served with Metzner in the military and bought Bieler's business interest, and Julius Bunsen, renamed their company the Hamilton Tile Works. Metzner served as the company's vice president for more than ten years. After the company's reorganization in 1897, Metzner left it to work for the American Encaustic Tiling Company in Zanesville, Ohio. In 1900, Metzner and his son, Max, helped reestablish the C. Pardee Works, a decorative tile manufacturer in Perth Amboy, New Jersey. The New Jersey firm later acquired the Grueby Faience Company of Boston.

== Later years and legacy ==
Metzner retired from business in 1912, and moved to Bayonne, New Jersey; he died at home on February 13, 1918, at the age of 83. Metzner's remains were returned to Indianapolis, where he was interred at Crown Hill Cemetery.

Metzner's business ventures contributed to the development of glazes for ceramic tile-relief panels, which were popular decorative items in Victorian-era America. His American Civil War sketches of the 32nd Indiana Infantry Regiment in camp, on the march, and in battle were published in Blood Shed in This War by the Indiana Historical Society in 2010, and provide a visual, firsthand account of his impressions of the people, places, and major events his regiment experienced during the war.

== Sources ==
- Dyer, Frederick H. (1908). A Compendium of the War of the Rebellion: Compiled and Arranged from Official Records of the Federal and Confederate Armies, Reports of the Adjutant Generals of the Several States, the Army Registers, and Other Reliable Documents and Sources. Des Moines, IA: Dyer Publishing Company. pp. 1131–32. OCLC 08697590.
- Nemerov, Alexander (June 2012). "Reviews: Blood Shed in This War: Civil War Illustrations by Captain Adolph Metzner, 32nd Indiana by Michael A. Peake". Indiana Magazine of History. 108 (2). Bloomington: Indiana University: 186. doi:10.5378/indimagahist.108.2.0186.
- Peake, Michael A. (2010). Blood Shed In This War. Indianapolis: Indiana Historical Society Press. ISBN 978-0-87195-269-1.
