= Battle of Adairsville =

Battle of the American Civil War

Coordinates: 34.4083°N 84.9389°W

- Part of the American Civil War
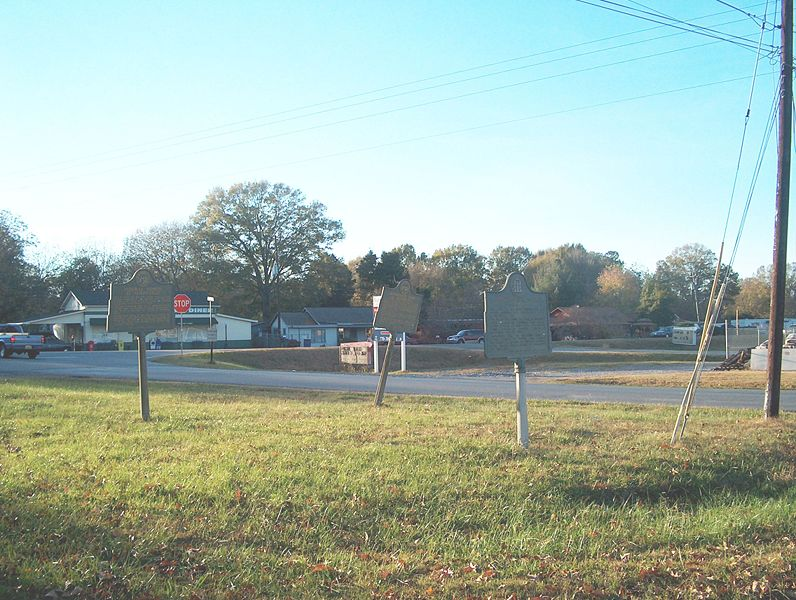
- Three marker signs in Adairsville Cemetery, site of part of the battlefield, describe the battle
Date	May 17, 1864
Location	Bartow County, Georgia
Result	Union victory

Belligerents
United States	(Confederate States of America) Confederate States

Commanders and leaders
William T. Sherman	Joseph E. Johnston

Units involved
Military Division of the Mississippi	Army of Tennessee

Strength
4,174	4,477

Casualties and losses
200	Unknown

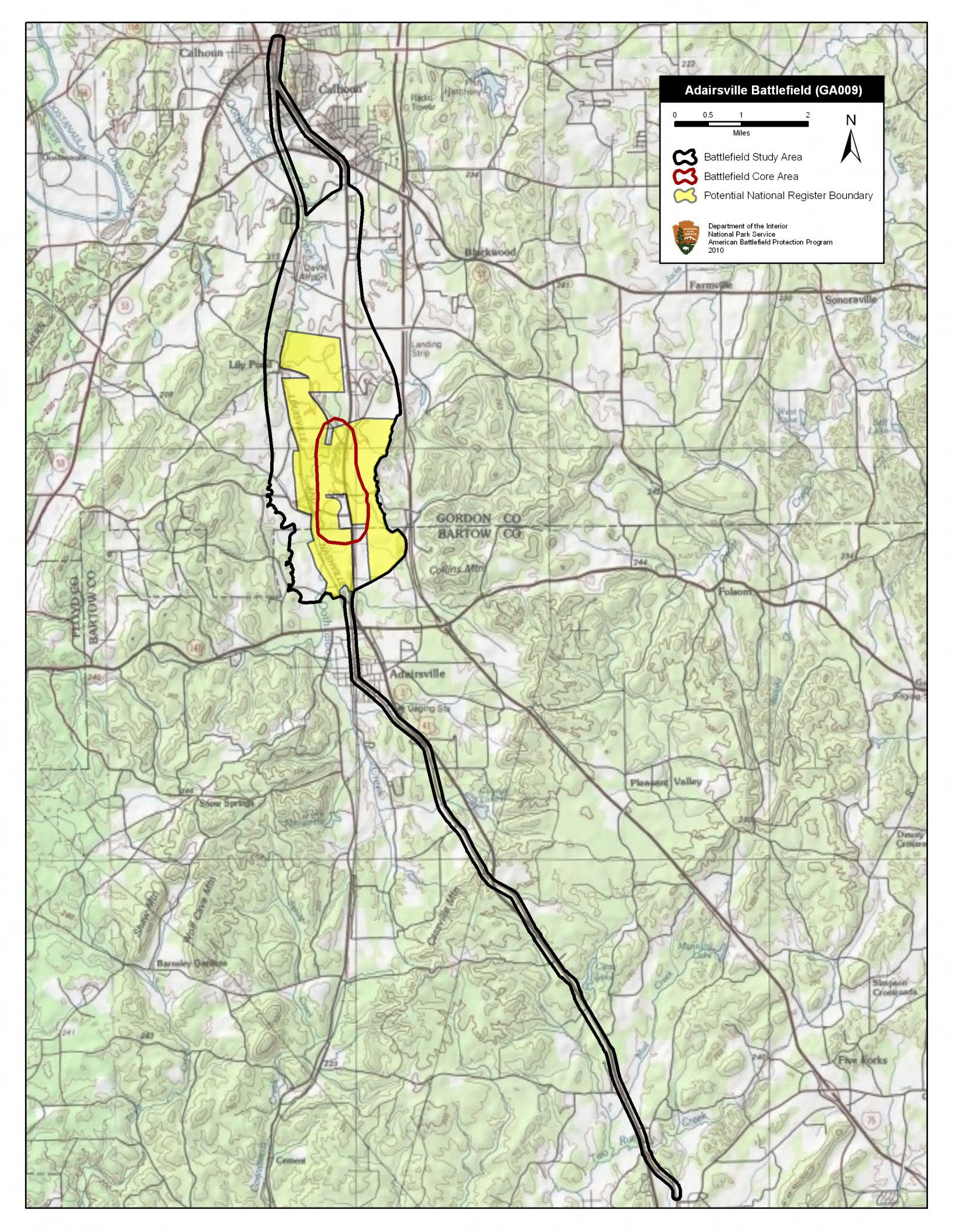
Map of Adairsville Battlefield core and study areas by the American Battlefield Protection Program

The Battle of Adairsville was a part of the Atlanta campaign fought during the American Civil War on May 17, 1864, just northeast of Rome, Georgia. The brief engagement was a Confederate delaying action that allowed General Joseph E. Johnston to bait a trap for the Union army at Cassville.

== Prelude ==
Following the Battle of Resaca, May 13–15, General Joseph E. Johnston's army retreated southward while Major General William Tecumseh Sherman pursued. Failing to find a good defensive position south of Calhoun, Georgia, Johnston continued to Adairsville, while the Confederate cavalry fought a skillful rearguard action and kept Sherman away from Atlanta.

== The battle ==
Once across the Oostanaula River, Johnston sought to make a stand and draw the Federals into a costly assault. He expected to find favorable terrain near Calhoun, but in this he was disappointed and during the night of May 16–17 he led the Confederates southward toward Adairsville. Sherman followed, dividing his forces into three columns, and advancing on a broad front. There were skirmishes all along the route, but the main bodies were not engaged.

Two miles north of Adairsville Oliver Otis Howard and the Union IV Corps began skirmishing with entrenched units of William J. Hardee's Confederate corps. The 44th Illinois and 24th Wisconsin infantry regiments led by Maj. Arthur MacArthur, Jr. (father of Douglas MacArthur) attacked Benjamin F. Cheatham's division and suffered heavy losses. The rest of Howard's corps prepared for battle but further attacks were called off by General Thomas. At Adairsville, Johnston again hoped to find a position in which he could give battle but there too the terrain was unsuitable for further defense and the Confederate commander was forced to continue his withdrawal. As he fell back, however, Johnston devised a strategy that he hoped would lead to the destruction of a part of Sherman's forces. There were two roads leading south from Adairsville—one south to Kingston, the other southeast to Cassville. It seemed likely that Sherman would divide his armies so as to use both roads. This would give Johnston the opportunity to attack one column before the other could come to its aid.

When the Southerners abandoned Adairsville during the night of May 17–18, Johnston sent William J. Hardee's Corps to Kingston, while he fell back toward Cassville with the rest of his army. He hoped that Sherman would believe most of the Southerners to be in Kingston and concentrate the bulk of his forces there. Hardee would then hold off the Northerners at Kingston while Johnston, with Leonidas Polk and John Bell Hood, destroyed the smaller Federal column at Cassville.

Sherman reacted as Johnston hoped, ordering James B. McPherson and the bulk of George Henry Thomas's army toward Kingston while sending only John Schofield and one corps of Thomas' army along the road to Cassville. On the morning of May 19, Johnston ordered Hood to march along a country road a mile or so east of the Adairsville-Cassville Road and form his corps for battle facing west. While Polk attacked the head of the Federal column, Hood was to assail its left flank. As Hood was moving into position, he ran into Daniel Butterfield's Federal brigade to the east. This was a source of great danger, for had Hood formed facing west, these Federals would have been in position to attack the exposed flank and rear of his corps. After a brief skirmish with the Northerners, Hood fell back to rejoin Polk. Johnston, believing that the opportunity for a successful battle had passed, ordered Hood and Polk to move to a new line east and south of Cassville, where they were joined by Hardee who had been pushed out of Kingston. Johnston formed his army on a ridge and hoped that Sherman would attack him there on May 20. As usual, the Southern commander was confident of repulsing the enemy.

During the night, the Confederates withdrew across the Etowah River. As they fell back, their feelings were mixed. They had lost a very strong position at Dalton, and had fallen back from Resaca, Calhoun, and Adairsville. Now they were retreating again under cover of darkness. That morning as they prepared for battle, their spirits had been high. Now their disappointment was bitter. Although morale would revive in the next few days, many Southern soldiers would never again place as much confidence in Johnston's abilities as they once had.
