= Battle of Marietta =

Battle of the American Civil War

Coordinates: 33.9531°N 84.5499°W

- Part of the American Civil War
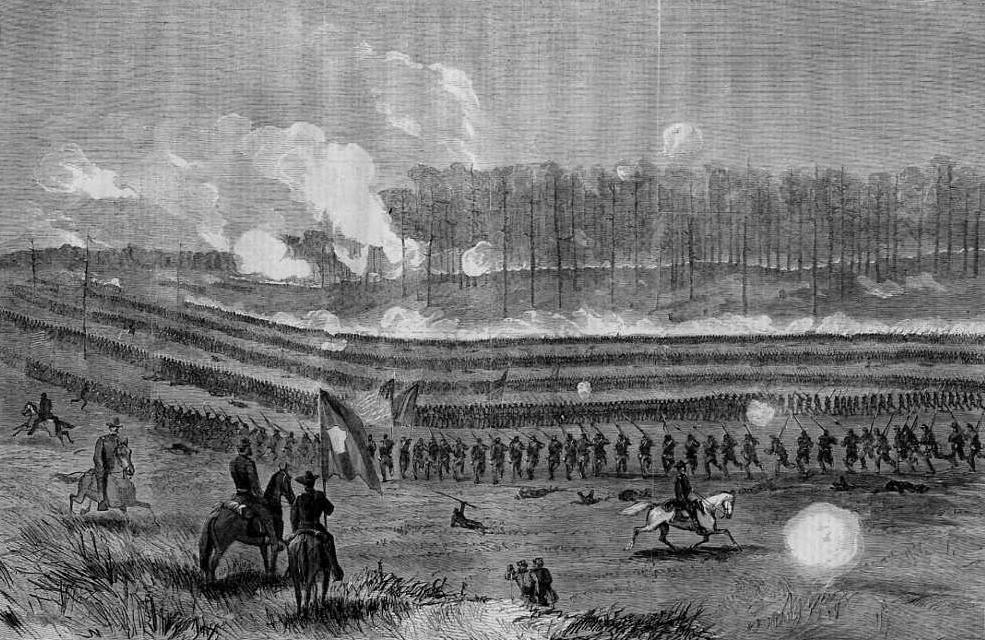
- Attack on the Enemy's Centre, Near Marietta, Georgia
| Date | June 9, 1864– July 3, 1864 (3 weeks and 3 days) |
| Location | Cobb County, Georgia |
| Result | Union victory |

Belligerents
| United States (Union) | (Confederate States of America) CSA (Confederacy) |

Commanders and leaders
| (United States) William T. Sherman | (Confederate States of America) Joseph E. Johnston (Confederate States of America) Leonidas Polk † |

Units involved
| Military Division of the Mississippi | Army of Tennessee |

Casualties and losses
| Unknown | Unknown |

The Battle of Marietta was a series of military operations from June 9 through July 3, 1864, in Cobb County, Georgia, between Union and Confederate forces during the American Civil War. The Union forces, led by Maj. Gen. William Tecumseh Sherman, encountered the Confederate Army of Tennessee, led by Gen. Joseph E. Johnston, entrenched near Marietta, Georgia.

== Battles ==
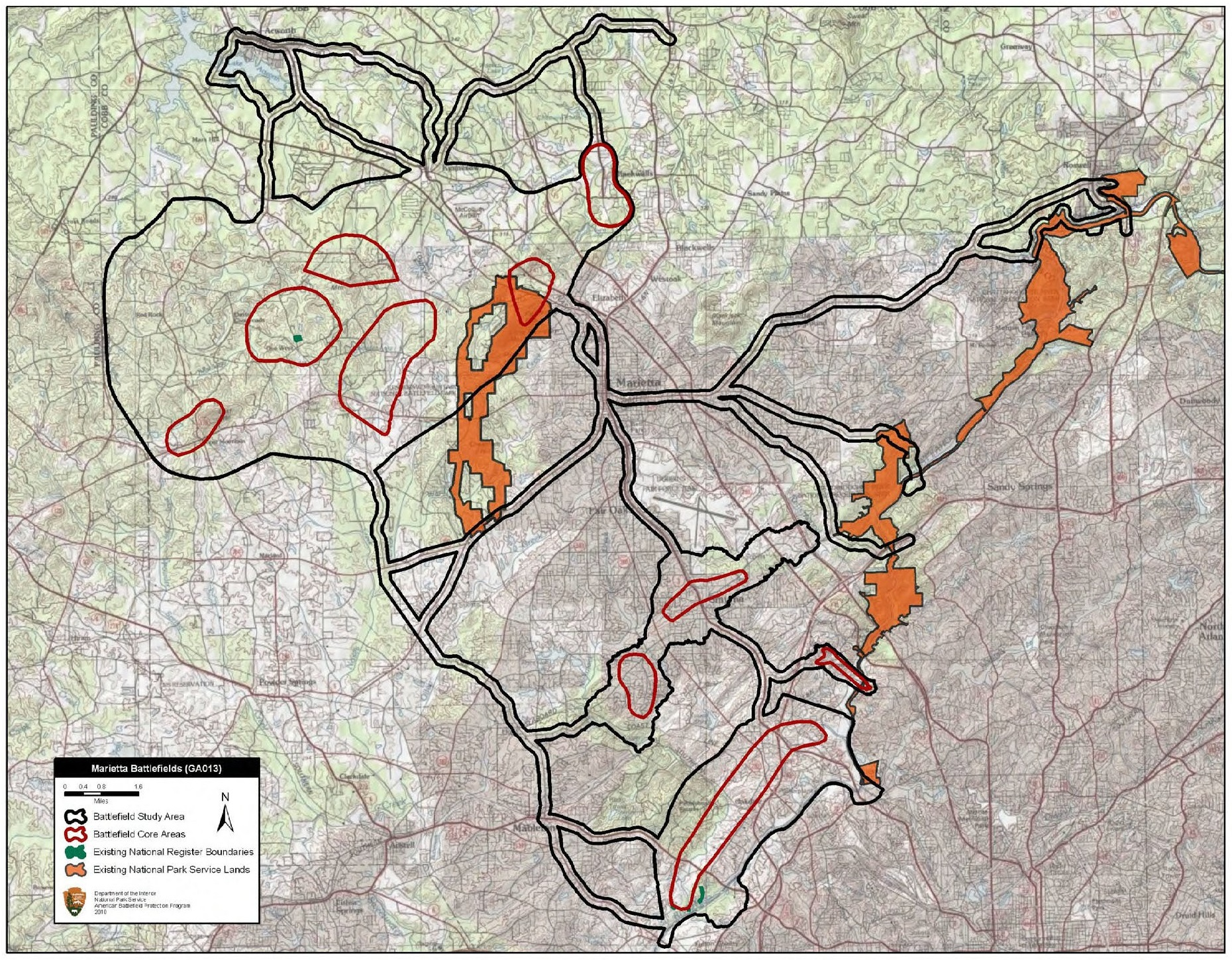
Map of Marietta Battlefields core and study areas by the American Battlefield Protection Program.

Several engagements were fought during this four-week period, including the battles of Pine Mountain (June 14), Gilgal Church (June 15), Kolb's Farm (June 22), and Kennesaw Mountain (June 27). Sherman forced Johnston to withdraw partially on June 18 to protect his supply lines, but the Union forces were not fully victorious until July 3.

== Death of Lieutenant General Polk ==
On June 14, 1864, Confederate General Leonidas Polk, second cousin of former United States president James K. Polk was scouting enemy positions near Marietta, Georgia with his staff when he was killed in action by a Federal 3-inch (76 mm) shell at Pine Mountain. The artillery fire was initiated when Sherman spotted a cluster of Confederate officers—Polk, William J. Hardee, Johnston, and their staffs—in an exposed area. He pointed them out to Maj. Gen. Oliver O. Howard, commander of the IV Corps, and ordered him to fire on them. The 5th Indiana Battery, commanded by Capt. Peter Simonson, obeyed the order within minutes. The first round came close and a second even closer, causing the men to disperse. The third shell struck Polk's left arm, went through the chest, and exited hitting his right arm then exploded against a tree, cutting Polk nearly in two.
