= 78th New York Infantry Regiment =

- Active: January 1862 to July 12, 1864
- Country: United States
- Allegiance: Union
- Branch: Infantry
- Nickname: 78th Highlanders
- Engagements: Battle of Cedar Mountain; Battle of South Mountain; Battle of Antietam; Battle of Chancellorsville; Battle of Gettysburg; Chattanooga campaign Battle of Lookout Mountain; Battle of Missionary Ridge; Battle of Ringgold Gap; Atlanta campaign Battle of Resaca; Battle of Dallas; Battle of New Hope Church; Battle of Allatoona; Battle of Gilgal Church; Battle of Kennesaw Mountain

The 78th New York Infantry Regiment ("78th Highlanders") was an infantry regiment in the Union Army during the American Civil War.

== Service ==
The 78th New York Infantry was organized at New York City, New York January through April 1862 and mustered in April 12, 1862 for a three-year enlistment under the command of Colonel Daniel Ullman.

The regiment was attached to Defenses of Washington, D.C., to May 1862. 2nd Brigade, Sigel's Division, Army of the Shenandoah, to June 1862. 2nd Brigade, 2nd Division, II Corps, Pope's Army of Virginia, to August 1862. 3rd Brigade, 2nd Division, II Corps, Army of Virginia, to September 1862. 3rd Brigade, 2nd Division, XII Corps, Army of the Potomac, to October 1863. 3rd Brigade, 2nd Division, XII Corps, Army of the Cumberland, to April 1864. 3rd Brigade, 2nd Division, XX Corps, Army of the Cumberland, to July 1864.

The 78th New York Infantry ceased to exist on July 12, 1864 when it was consolidated with the 102nd New York Volunteer Infantry.

== Detailed service ==
Left New York for Washington, D.C., April 29, 1862. Duty in the defenses of Washington until May 24, 1862. Moved to Harpers Ferry, Va., May 24. Defense of Harpers Ferry May 28–30. Operations in the Shenandoah Valley until August. Battle of Cedar Mountain August 9. Pope's Campaign in northern Virginia August 16-September 2. Battle of Sulphur Springs August 23–24. Battle of Groveton August 29. Second Battle of Bull Run August 30. Maryland Campaign September 6–12. South Mountain, Md., September 14. Battle of Antietam, Md., September 16–17. Duty at Bolivar Heights until December. Reconnaissance to Rippon, Va., November 9. Reconnaissance from Bolivar Heights to Winchester December 2–6. March to Fredericksburg, Va., December 9–16. Duty at Fairfax until January 20, 1863. "Mud March" January 20–24. Chancellorsville Campaign April 27-May 6. Battle of Chancellorsville May 1–5. Gettysburg Campaign June 11-July 24. Battle of Gettysburg July 1–3. Pursuit of Lee to Manassas Gap, Va., July 5–24. Duty on line of the Rappahannock until September 24. Movement to Bridgeport, Ala., September 24-October 3. Reopening Tennessee River October 26–29. Battle of Wauhatchie, Tenn., October 28–29. Chattanooga-Ringgold Campaign November 23–27. Battle of Lookout Mountain November 23–24. Battle of Missionary Ridge November 25. Battle of Ringgold Gap, Taylor's Ridge, November 27. Duty at Bridgeport, Ala., until May 1864. Atlanta Campaign May 1 to July 12, 1864. Operations about Rocky Faced Ridge, Tunnel Hill, and Buzzard's Roost Gap May 8–11. Battle of Resaca May 14–15. Near Cassville May 19. New Hope Church May 25. Battles about Dallas, New Hope Church, and Allatoona Hills May 26-June 5. Operations about Marietta and against Kennesaw Mountain June 10-July 2. Pine Hill June 11–14. Lost Mountain June 15–17. Gilgal or Golgotha Church June 15. Muddy Creek June 17. Noyes' Creek June 19. Kolb's Farm June 22. Assault on Kennesaw June 27. Ruff's Station, Smyrna Camp Ground, July 4. Chattahoochie River July 5–12.

== Casualties ==
The regiment lost a total of 131 men during service; 3 officers and 55 enlisted men killed or mortally wounded, 73 enlisted men died of disease.

== Commanders ==
- Colonel Daniel Ullman
- Colonel Herbert von Hammerstein
- Lieutenant Colonel Jonathan Austin - commanded at the Battle of Antietam
- Major Henry R. Stagg - commanded at the Battle of Antietam while still at the rank of captain after Ltc. Austin was promoted to brigade command

== See also ==
- List of New York Civil War regiments
- New York in the Civil War
