= Battle of Gilgal Church =

1864 American Civil War battle

Coordinates: 33.97013°N 84.66372°W

- Part of the American Civil War
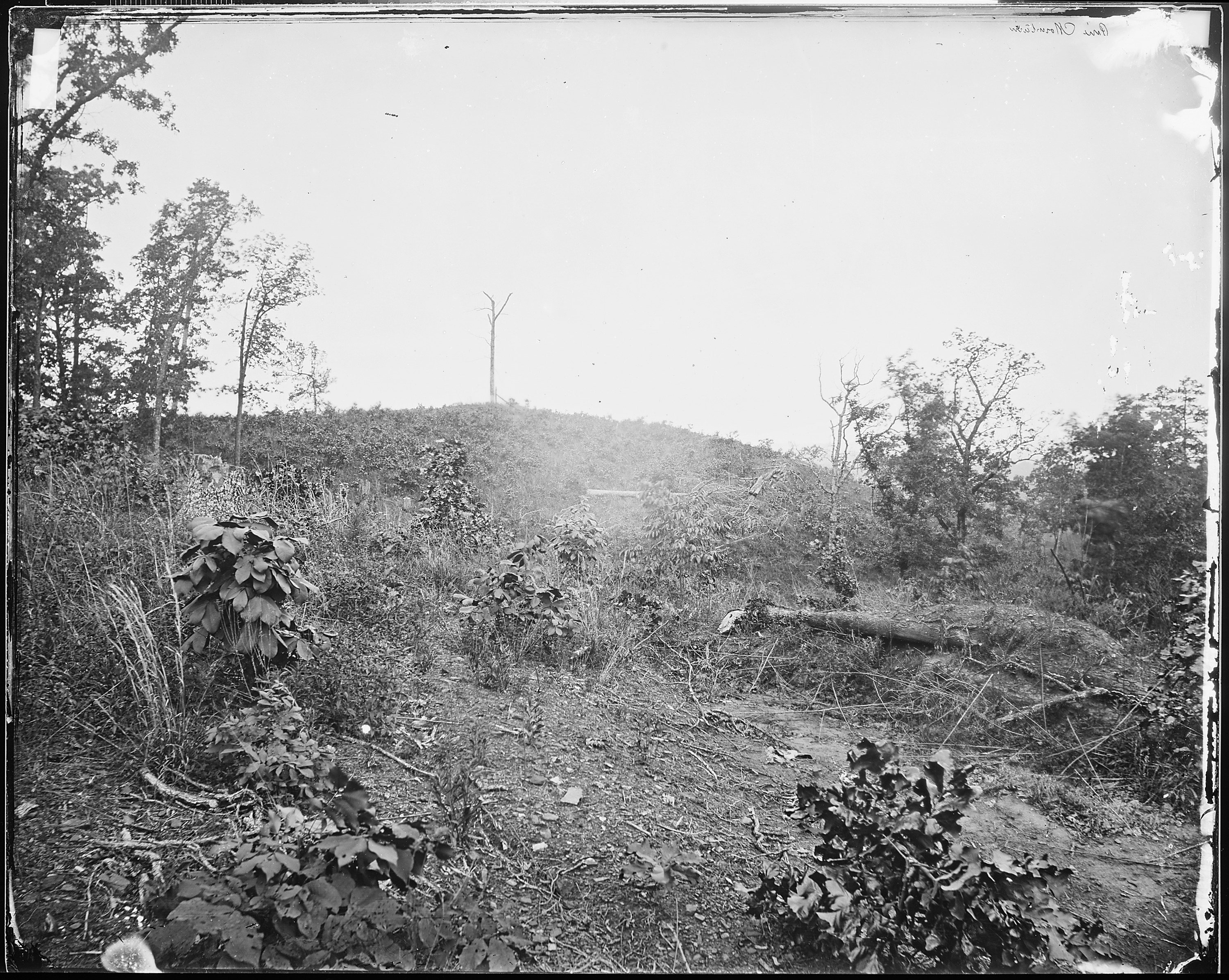
- Wartime photograph shows Pine Mountain near where General Polk was killed.
Date	June 15, 1864
Location	Cobb County, Georgia
Result	Confederate tactical victory

Belligerents
United States	(Confederate States of America) Confederate States

Commanders and leaders
William T. Sherman; Joseph Hooker	Joseph E. Johnston; William J. Hardee

Units involved
Military Division of the Mississippi	Army of Tennessee

Strength
June 10–19: c. 100,000	June 10–19: c. 65,000

Casualties and losses
Gilgal Church: 650–734; Latimer's Farm: unknown	Gilgal Church: 250 (Note: Confederates lost 320 prisoners in a separate action on the same day. Union losses in this action are unknown.); Latimer's Farm: 200

The Battle of Gilgal Church (June 15, 1864) was an action during the Atlanta campaign in the American Civil War. The Union army of William Tecumseh Sherman and the Confederate army led by Joseph E. Johnston fought a series of battles between June 10 and 19 along a front stretching northeast from Lost Mountain to Pine Mountain to Brushy Mountain. At Gilgal Church, attacks by the divisions of John W. Geary and Daniel Butterfield from Joseph Hooker's XX Corps were repulsed with about 700 casualties by Confederates from William J. Hardee's corps. That day in a separate action, other Union troops overran a Confederate skirmish line, capturing about 300 men. Gilgal Church was part of a series of minor actions that included the Battle of Latimer's Farm on June 17–18.

After the Battle of Dallas on May 28, Sherman moved northeast until he reached the Western and Atlantic Railroad at Acworth. On June 4, Johnston abandoned his defensive positions near Dallas and New Hope Church and withdrew to a new line of entrenchments. Sherman was reinforced by Francis Preston Blair Jr.'s XVII Corps, and on June 10 he resumed his offensive. Confederate corps commander Leonidas Polk was killed by an artillery round on June 14 at Pine Mountain. That evening, Johnston withdrew from Pine Mountain and Sherman's forces followed, bringing on the clashes near Gilgal Church. Shortly after the Union attacks failed, Johnston pulled Hardee's corps back to a new line behind Mud Creek. At Latimer's Farm, Union troops from Oliver Otis Howard's IV Corps gained a foothold in the Confederate line. On June 19, Johnston's Army of Tennessee fell back to fresh defenses based on Kennesaw Mountain.

== Background ==
=== Union Army ===
William T. Sherman directed parts of three armies drawn from the Military Division of the Mississippi in the Atlanta campaign. On April 30, 1864, the Army of the Cumberland commanded by George H. Thomas numbered 73,000 troops and 130 guns, the Army of the Tennessee led by James B. McPherson counted 24,500 soldiers and 96 guns, and the Army of the Ohio under John Schofield fielded 11,362 infantry, 2,197 cavalry, and 28 guns. Sherman's forces were supported by 25,000 non-combatants including railroad employees and repair crews, teamsters, medical staff, and Black camp servants. Thomas' army included Howard's IV Corps, John M. Palmer's XIV Corps, Hooker's XX Corps, and three cavalry divisions led by Edward M. McCook, Kenner Garrard, and Hugh Judson Kilpatrick. McPherson's army was made up of John A. Logan's XV Corps and Grenville M. Dodge's Left Wing of the XVI Corps. Blair's XVII Corps joined McPherson's army on June 8. Schofield's army consisted of his own XXIII Corps and a cavalry division under George Stoneman. The IV and XX Corps each numbered 20,000 soldiers, the XIV Corps counted 22,000, the XV Corps had 11,500, and the XVI and XVII Corps each counted about 10,000 men.

=== Confederate Army ===
Johnston's Army of Tennessee included two infantry corps led by William J. Hardee and John Bell Hood, and a cavalry corps under Joseph Wheeler. The army was soon joined by the corps of Leonidas Polk and the cavalry division of William Hicks Jackson from the Army of Mississippi. Hardee's corps consisted of the divisions of William B. Bate, Benjamin F. Cheatham, Patrick Cleburne, and William H. T. Walker. Hood's corps was made up of the divisions of Thomas C. Hindman, Carter L. Stevenson, and Alexander P. Stewart. Polk's corps included the divisions of James Cantey, Samuel Gibbs French, and William Wing Loring. On April 30, 1864, Johnston's Army of Tennessee reported 41,279 infantry, 8,436 cavalry, and 3,227 artillerymen serving 144 guns. Battles and Leaders calculated Johnston's reinforcements as follows: Hugh W. Mercer's brigade (2,800) on May 2, Cantey's division (5,300) on May 7, Loring's division (5,145) on May 10–12, French's detachment (550) on May 12, Jackson's cavalry (4,477) on May 17, French's division (4,174) on May 19, William Andrew Quarles' brigade (2,200) on May 26, and a 643-man detachment of Jackson's cavalry on June 10. Other reinforcements came from two Georgia state regiments (1,200), men returned from furlough, recruits, and returned deserters. There were about 8,000 non-combatants supporting the army, mostly men unfit for combat.

=== Operations ===
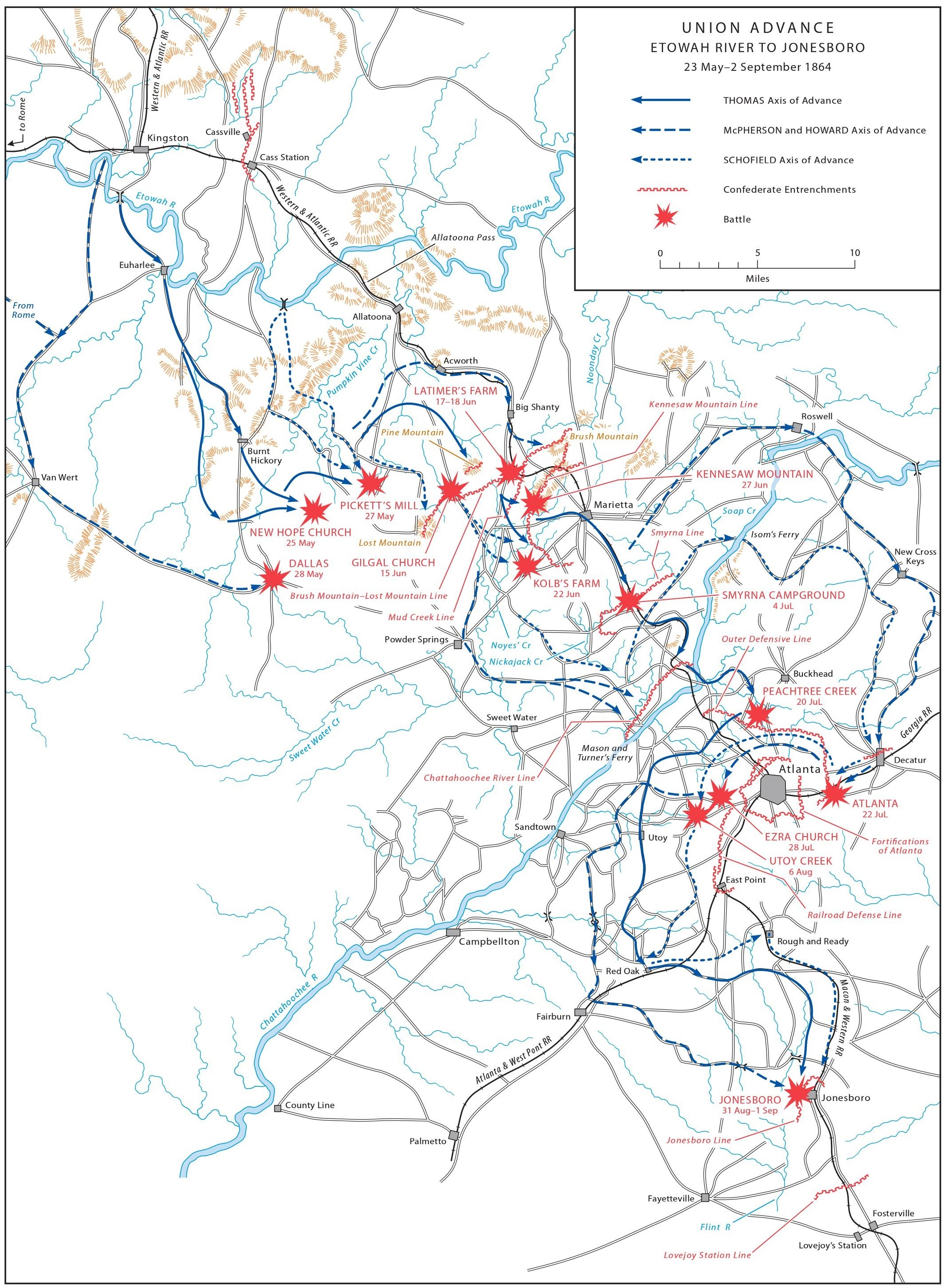
Gilgal Church and Latimer's Farm can be seen in the map's center.

General-in-chief of the Union Army Ulysses S. Grant instructed Sherman, "to move against Johnston's army, to break it up, and to get into the interior of the enemy's country as far as you can, inflicting all the damage you can against their war resources". Atlanta was a key Confederate railroad hub, supply point, and manufacturing center, so Sherman selected it as his geographic objective. The Atlanta campaign began with the Battle of Rocky Face Ridge on May 5–9, 1864 when Sherman sent McPherson's army to envelop Johnston's west flank and the Confederate commander withdrew to Resaca. The Battle of Resaca was fought on 13–16 May and ended when Johnston retreated. Meanwhile, Polk's corps began arriving in the theater. In the Battle of Adairsville on May 18, Johnston planned to strike at part of Sherman's forces. The attempt miscarried and the Confederate army fell back on the night of May 19 to a strong position at Allatoona. Declining to attack the Confederate position frontally, Sherman attempted a wide sweep around Johnston's western flank with McPherson on the right, Thomas in the center, and Schofield on the left. This resulted in the battles of New Hope Church, Pickett's Mill, and Dallas in late May.

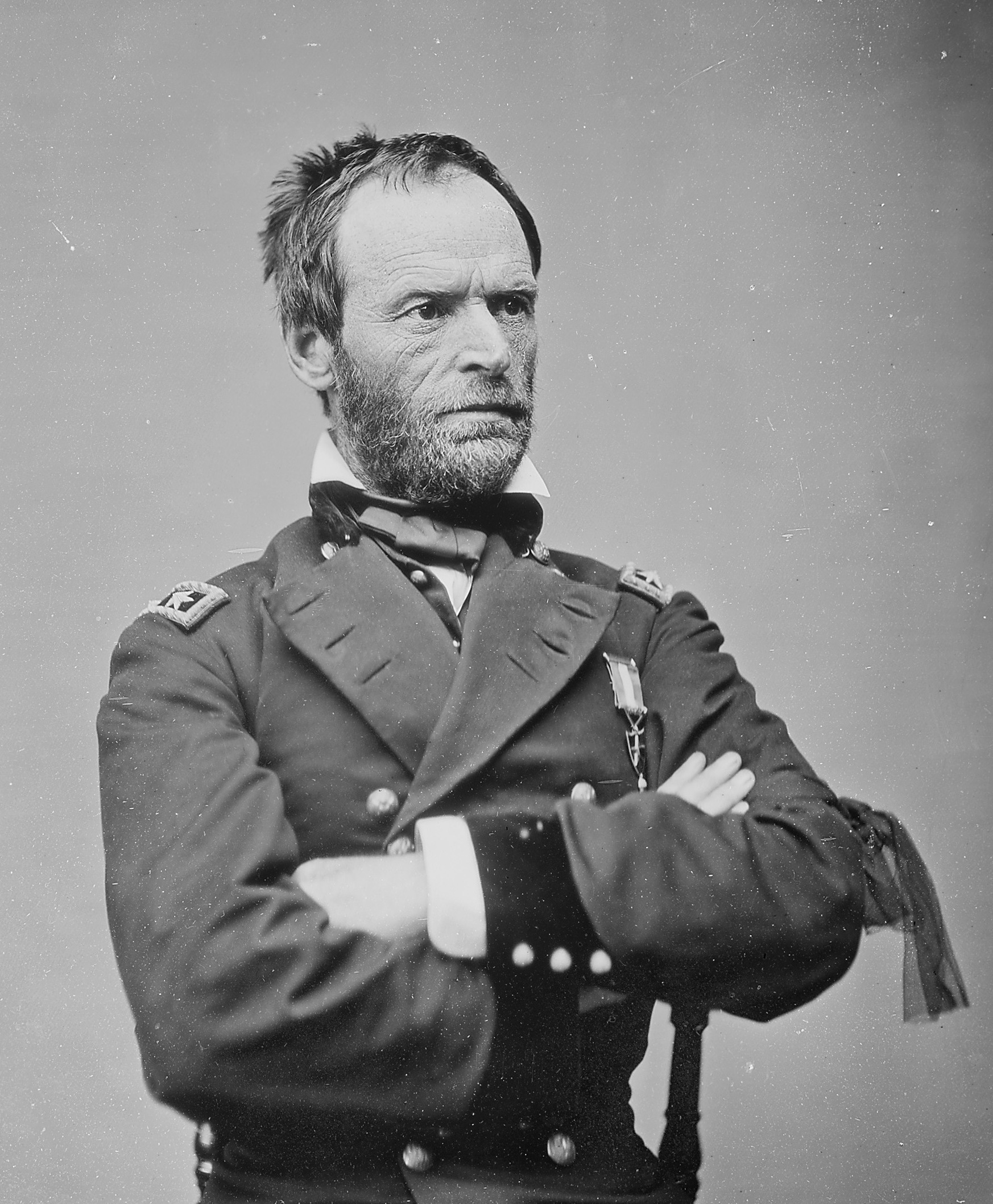
William T. Sherman

Blocked by Johnston's defenses, Sherman ordered McPherson's two corps to carefully pull back from their position on the right flank near Dallas during the night of May 31. This started a move to shift the Union forces eastward toward Acworth. On June 1, Logan's XV Corps occupied the trenches of Hooker's XX Corps, and Hooker's men marched 6 mi (9.7 km) northeast. The same day at 5 pm, Stoneman's cavalry reached Allatoona which was not defended. This meant that Sherman's railroad repair crews were finally able to work on the track from Kingston to the Etowah River. On June 2, supported by Hooker, Schofield's corps moved north and east and gained a foothold across Allatoona Creek before encountering a newly dug line of Confederate entrenchments. At the same time, two divisions of Palmer's corps filled in the gap between Schofield and the rest of Sherman's forces. On the morning of June 2, it began to rain, beginning an unusually wet month. When Hooker's corps and McCook's cavalry began extending the Union left flank on June 3, Johnston decided that he needed to abandon the defense lines around New Hope Church. On the night of June 4, the Confederate army pulled back into a new line of entrenchments that ran from Lost Mountain on the southwest to Brushy Mountain on the northeast. In the center, Johnston's troops held a salient at Pine Mountain.

In two weeks of fighting around Dallas and New Hope Church, Sherman's forces suffered 4,500 casualties while Johnston's army lost 3,000. Confederate morale, which declined after the earlier retreats, was boosted by Johnston's successful defensive moves. Since the start of the campaign, Sherman's three armies sustained about 12,000 casualties out of a total of 100,000 men, while Johnston's army lost about 9,000 out of an estimated 65,000–75,000 men. The problem for Johnston was that Sherman advanced about 80 mi (129 km) into Georgia and that the Union forces were relatively stronger than they were at Resaca. Also, Sherman was about to be reinforced by the XVII Corps and other units while Johnston could only look for help from the Georgia militia.

== June 10–19 fighting ==
=== Pine Mountain ===
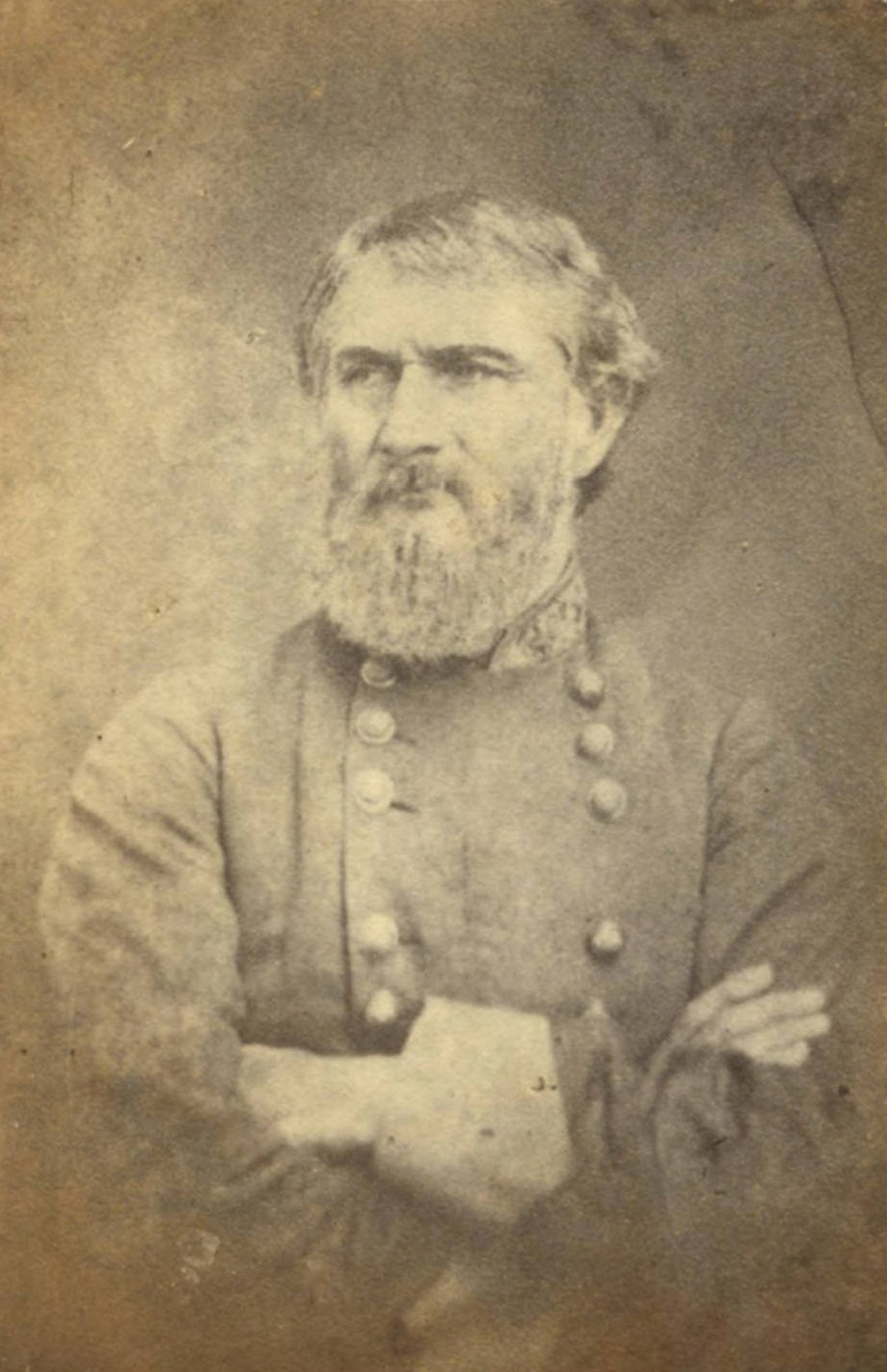
Leonidas Polk

Sherman rearranged his forces when it was clear that Johnston's army had withdrawn to a new line of defenses. While Schofield's corps held its position, Thomas' army moved into position on its left. Meanwhile, McPherson's army moved behind both Schofield and Thomas to take a position on the railroad at Acworth. While on June 2, Schofield's corps marked Sherman's left flank, by June 7, Schofield was on Sherman's right flank, Thomas held the center, and McPherson was on the left flank. The rain continued, the increasingly muddy roads making it difficult to bring up supplies by wagon. Therefore, it was timely for Sherman's force to be able to establish itself on its railroad supply line. On June 8, two divisions of Blair's XVII Corps reached Acworth with 9,000 veteran soldiers, after leaving 2,000 men to garrison Rome and 1,500 more to garrison Allatoona. One of Schofield's division commanders, Alvin Peterson Hovey, disgruntled at being passed over for promotion, resigned his command and went home. Consequently, the XXIII Corps was consolidated into two divisions under Jacob Dolson Cox and Milo Smith Hascall, both competent generals.

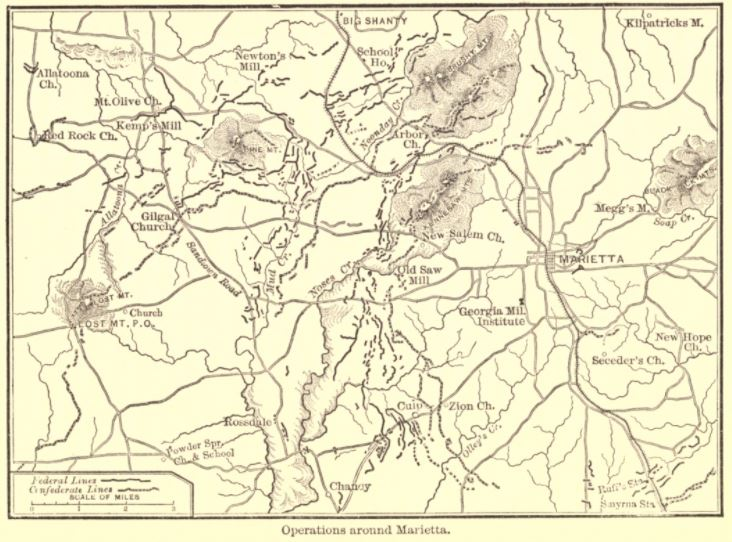
Operations around Marietta map from Jacob D. Cox's Atlanta

On June 6, Union repair crews began rebuilding the railroad bridge across the Etowah River. On June 9, Railroad Construction and Repair Corps chief William Wierman Wright assured Sherman that the bridge would be finished on June 12. With this information, Sherman ordered his forces to start a fresh advance on the morning of June 10. Johnston believed he was outnumbered two-to-one by Sherman; the true ratio was three-to-two. At first, Johnston concentrated his strength on the left between Lost Mountain and Gilgal Church, but he shifted his strength to the right between Gilgal Church and Brushy Mountain when Sherman moved north to the railroad. On June 10, Sherman advanced his forces with Stoneman's cavalry covering the right, Garrard's horsemen on the left flank, and McCook's cavalry in the rear, watching the Etowah crossings. McPherson's army marched down the main road, occupied Big Shanty, and came into contact with the Confederates holding Brushy Mountain. Blair's corps was on the left while Logan's and Dodge's corps were on the right. Thomas deployed his army into three columns with Palmer's corps on the left heading for Newton's Mills. Howard's corps in the center and Hooker's corps on the right marched toward Pine Mountain. Schofield's corps moved from Mount Olivet Church toward Gilgal Church with Hascall's division on the left and Cox's on the right.

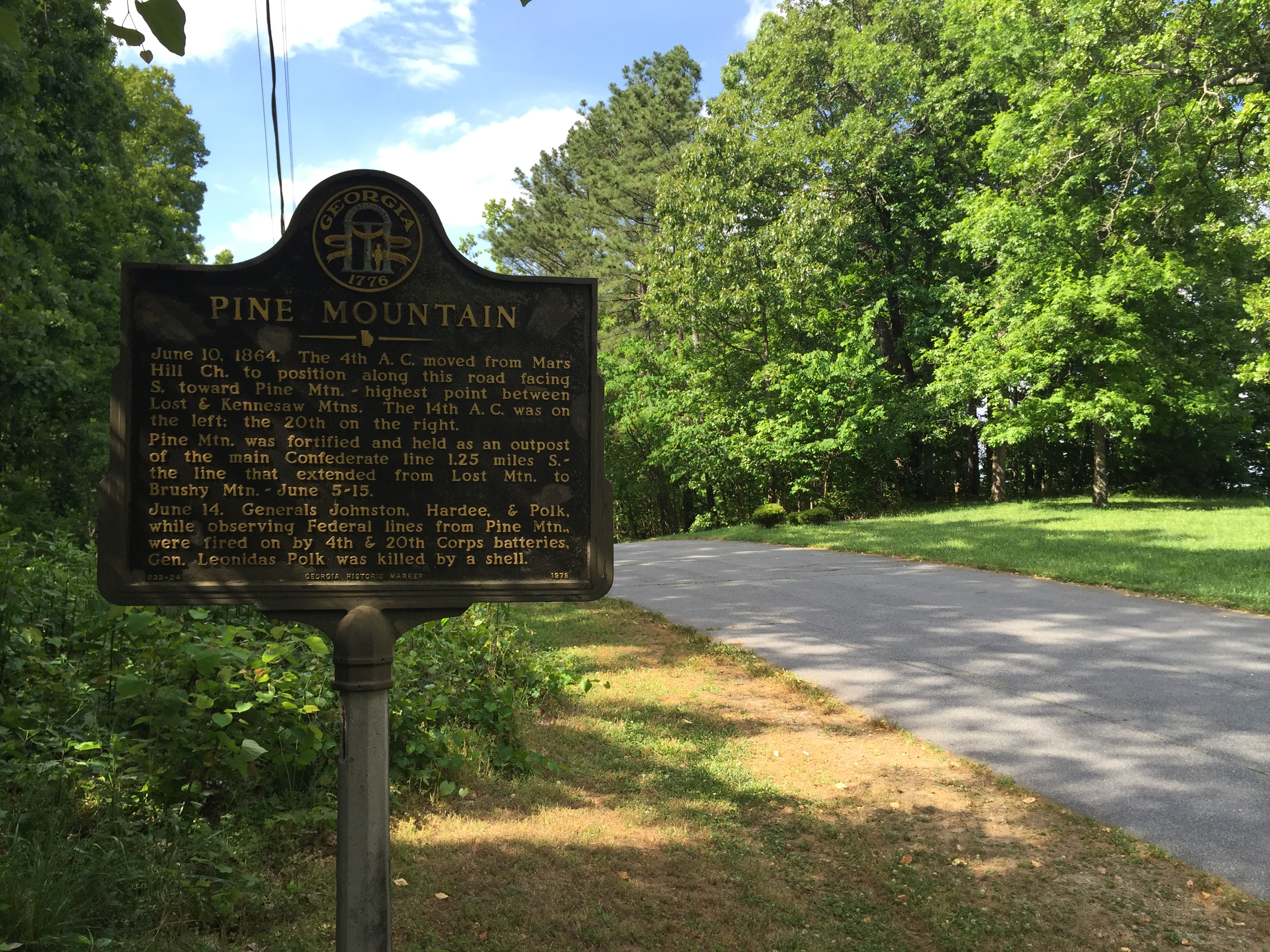
Historical marker on Pine Mountain

Each Union infantry column was headed by a swarm of skirmishers supported by a battery of rifled artillery. By late morning, the advancing Federals bumped into Confederate skirmishers near Pine Mountain. This feature was 1 mi (1.6 km) long and 300 ft (91 m) above the surrounding terrain, and was held by William B. Bate's division and four artillery batteries. Johnston's army deployed with Hood's corps on the right flank at Brushy Mountain and behind Noonday Creek, Hardee's corps on the left flank between Gilgal Church and Pine Mountain, and Polk's corps in the center. Wheeler's cavalry guarded the Confederate right flank and Jackson's cavalry the left flank, manning trenches as far south as Lost Mountain. Johnston wanted the Federals to attack Pine Mountain, but Thomas only ordered his troops to dig entrenchments opposite the height. Schofield's advance came to a halt 0.5 mi (0.8 km) north of Gilgal Church when it encountered a line of entrenchments. June 11 was the ninth consecutive day of rain and the sodden condition of the ground made it difficult to get supplies to the Union troops. On that day, Wright's crews finished the Etowah bridge and a locomotive reached Sherman's headquarters at Big Shanty. At Sherman's request, the engineer took the locomotive almost to the skirmish line, tooting its whistle loudly to taunt the Confederates.

It rained for two more days, but June 14 dawned sunny and clear. When Sherman made a personal reconnaissance of Pine Mountain about 11 am, he noticed a group of officers on its summit looking at the Federal positions with field glasses. Sherman asked Howard to make the group take cover, ordered a nearby battery to fire three salvos, and rode off. Howard passed the order to Captain Peter Simonson who was artillery chief of David S. Stanley's division. Simonson issued the order to the 5th Independent Battery Indiana Light Artillery, which he recently commanded. In fact, the Confederates at the summit were Johnston, Hardee, Polk, and William S. Dilworth, the commander of Bate's Florida brigade. Hardee wanted Johnston to observe the isolation of Bate's division and authorize its retreat from Pine Mountain. Polk wished to view the terrain since Johnston asked his corps to stretch to the right toward Brushy Mountain. After an artillery round streaked overhead, Dilworth urgently asked the generals to disperse and they started to do this. A second and third shot arrived and when Dilworth looked back, Polk was on the ground, dead. Polk was struck in the side by a round from a 3-inch Ordnance rifle; it passed through his chest, ripping out his heart and mangling both arms. Dilworth insisted that Johnston and Hardee leave the summit and they reluctantly did so because the shells by then were falling in clusters.

Also on June 14, McPherson's army advanced on the opposing Confederate lines, with Mortimer Dormer Leggett's division of Blair's XVII Corps on the extreme left flank. In a "dashing charge", the 30th Illinois Infantry Regiment of Manning Ferguson Force's brigade captured a ridge that overlooked a line of outworks of Hood's corps. Outflanked, the Confederates withdrew behind Noonday Creek.

=== Gilgal Church ===
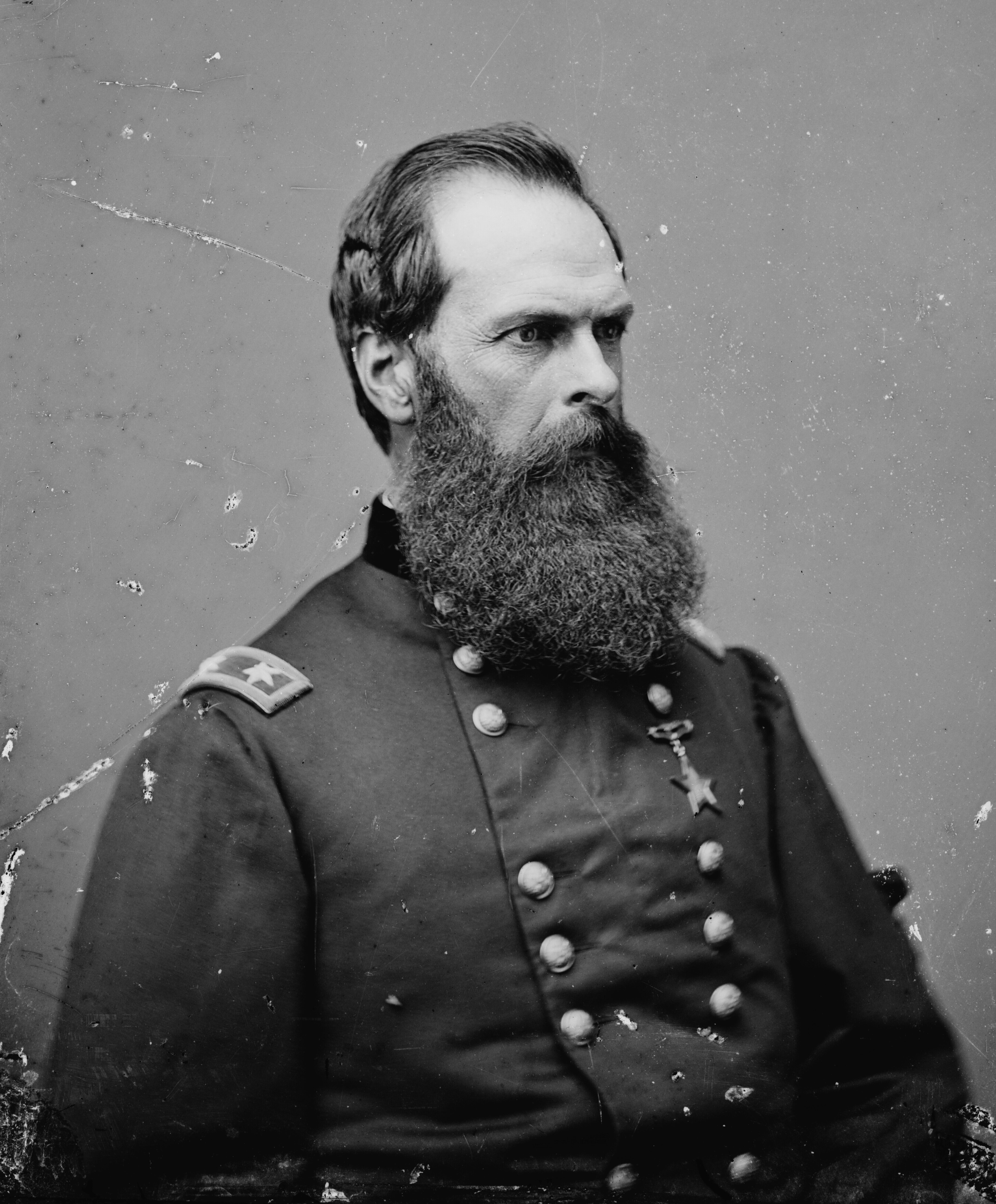
John W. Geary's division lost 519 men at Gilgal Church.

Johnston ordered the withdrawal of Bate's division and it was accomplished on the night of June 14–15. The senior division commander Loring assumed temporary command of Polk's corps. After discovering Pine Mountain was abandoned, Sherman believed that Johnston's entire army was retreating. He instructed McPherson to outflank Kennesaw Mountain and Schofield to seize Gilgal Church. He ordered Thomas to break through the Confederate center. When the IV and XIV Corps ran into tough opposition, Thomas ordered them to stop and employ their artillery. Nevertheless, these two corps moved forward 1 mi (1.6 km) and seized outworks before encountering the main defenses. Schofield's troops were enabled to capture an advanced line of Confederate entrenchments with small losses by first taking them under effective artillery fire. However, Hardee's main defenses at Gilgal Church remained intact. Stoneman's horsemen probed the Confederate lines near Lost Mountain.

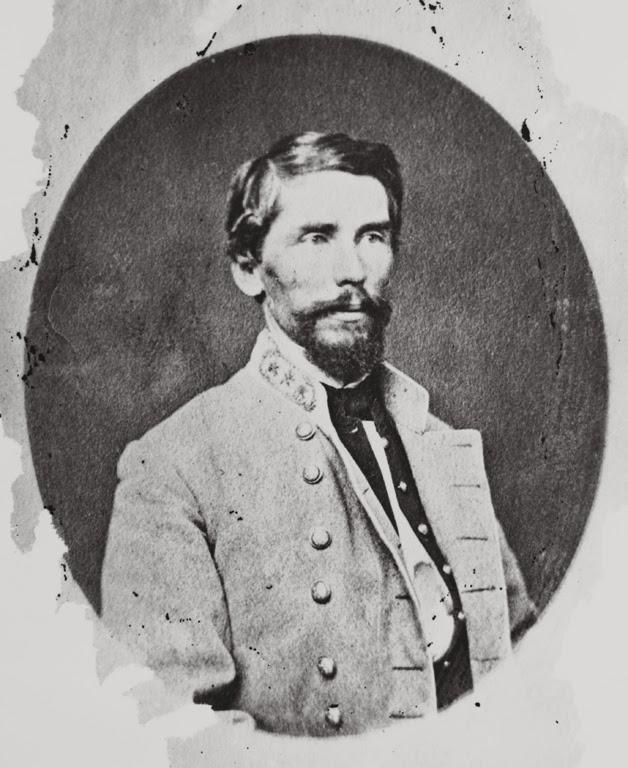
Patrick Cleburne

Hooker's XX Corps also overran Confederate outworks in its front. However, the divisions of Geary and Butterfield were bloodily repulsed east of Gilgal Church. For several hours until dark, Geary's troops attempted to break through the Confederate main line but failed. They suffered losses of 82 killed, 432 wounded, and 5 missing. Butterfield's troops attacked Cleburne's division at Gilgal Church but were also stopped. On June 15–16, Butterfield's division sustained losses of 25–40 killed and 135–175 wounded. Among those units opposing the Union soldiers were Key's Arkansas Battery, Goldthwaite's Alabama Battery, and the 24th Texas Cavalry Regiment (dismounted). One Texas captain described how his soldiers tore down the church, log by log, before the fighting commenced. One source put the casualties as 650 Union and 250 Confederate. The XX Corps suffered 5,000 casualties to date, more than any other corps in Sherman's host. Confederates began calling the XX Corps soldiers "Hooker's Ironsides" and Hooker's men quickly adopted the name for themselves.

The only Federal success on June 15 occurred on the eastern flank. McPherson moved William Harrow's division of Logan's XV Corps to the left of Blair's corps, such that it overlapped the Confederate right flank. Charles C. Walcutt's brigade charged across Noonday Creek and overran a line of Confederate rifle pits, taking 320 prisoners, mostly from the 40th Alabama Infantry Regiment, but some from the 31st Alabama. McPherson did not follow up this minor victory because his orders were only to threaten the Confederate right flank. That night, McPherson returned Harrow's division to its proper place in line south of Big Shanty.

Ever the optimist, Sherman hoped that Johnston was about to retreat. On June 16, he ordered Thomas to push ahead in the center, but the Army of the Cumberland commander ignored Sherman. Instead, Thomas deployed his artillery to blast the Confederates out of their defenses. While on a reconnaissance, Captain Simonson was shot in the head and killed. Later in the day, soldiers from the 101st Ohio Infantry Regiment captured a Confederate sniper who admitted hitting Simonson after missing three times. Out on the Federal right flank, Schofield moved Hascall's division to the right where one of his brigades seized a hill. When artillery batteries were deployed on the hill, they were able to take the Confederate defenses at Gilgal Church under enfilade fire. Some of Hooker's batteries also established a crossfire, and Cleburne's line started getting shelled from three directions. Johnston ordered Hardee's corps to pull back to a new line of entrenchments. During the withdrawal that night, a chance Union shell injured the leg of brigade commander Lucius E. Polk so badly that it had to be amputated. Polk was a nephew of the recently killed corps commander.

=== Latimer's Farm ===
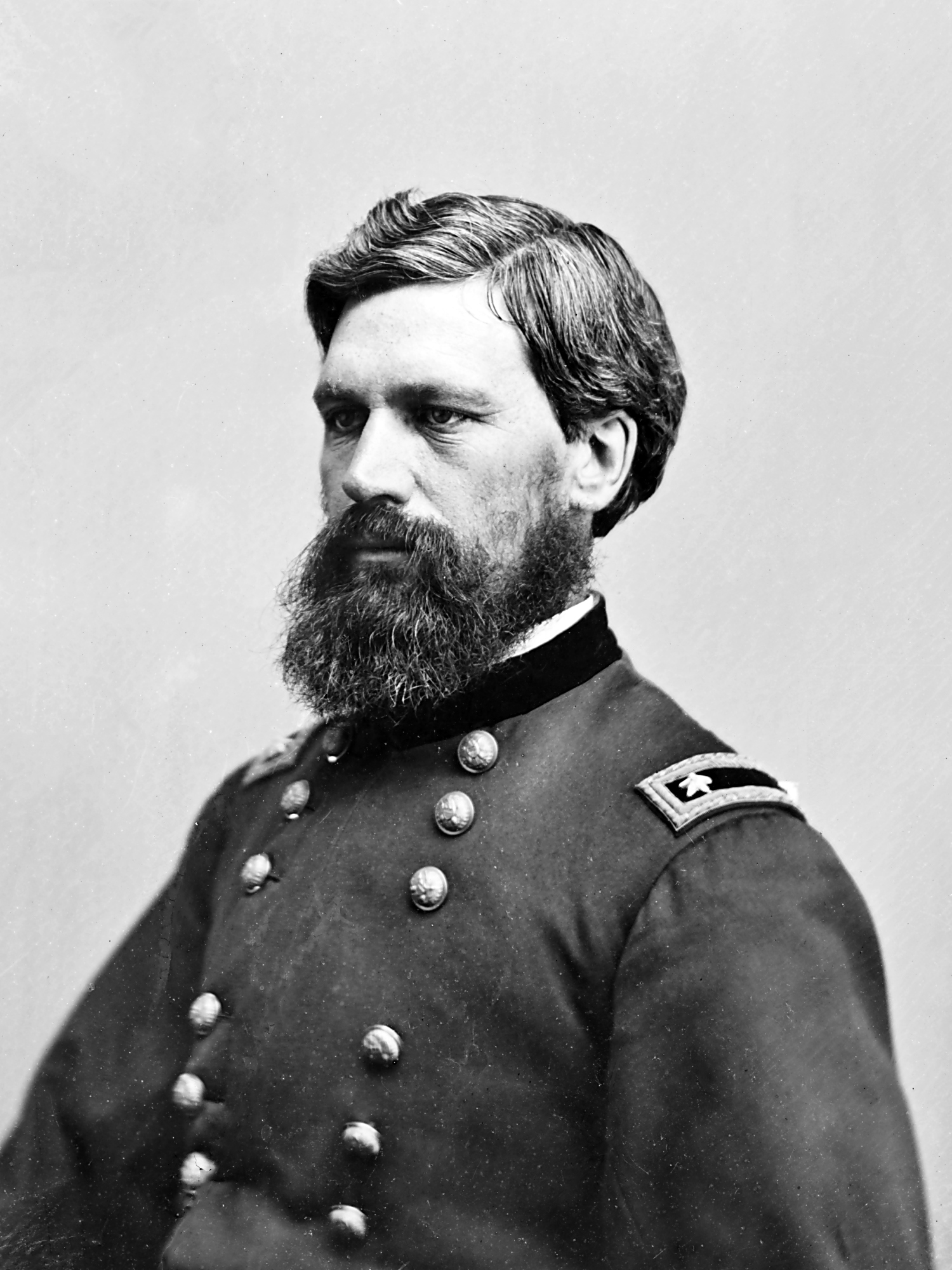
Oliver O. Howard

On the night of June 16–17, Hardee's corps pivoted on its right flank and swung its left flank back about 3 mi (4.8 km) in order to occupy a new set of entrenchments that Johnston prepared on the east bank of Mud Creek. On June 17, Hooker's and Schofield's corps advanced along the Sandtown Road, pressing back a covering force of Jackson's cavalry. Howard's corps moved forward about 2.5 mi (4.0 km) before encountering dug-in Confederates. Cox's division seized an island in Mud Creek with a hill that made a good artillery position. From the hill, Battery D, 1st Ohio Light Artillery silenced the opposing Confederate artillery after an hour-long bombardment. Meanwhile, Hascall's division crossed Mud Creek farther south, forcing Hardee to bend back his line to protect his left flank.

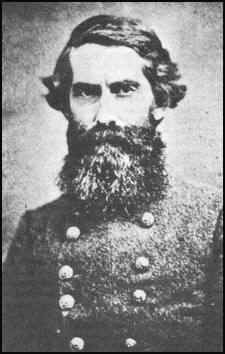
W. H. T. Walker

On June 17, Thomas ordered Howard's IV Corps to "attack the enemy" with the proviso that he should not attack if the enemy's position was too strong. After pondering this directive, Howard directed Thomas J. Wood's division to attack across an open field at 10 am, with John Newton's division supporting his left and Stanley's division in reserve. Skirmishing started but no attack occurred, and just before 2 pm Wood's skirmishers reported that there were breastworks 150 yd (137 m) ahead. Wood finally ordered his main line to attack at 4 pm, but nothing happened. Finally, at 6:30 pm, Thomas ordered Howard to shell the woods. A half-hour of tremendous bombardment caused troops from Walker's Confederate division to retreat so that Wood's division occupied the position. Sherman observed the proceedings starting at 9:30 am, becoming more and more angry at the soldiers' apparent timidity. Actually, Wood's division had been mauled at the Battle of Pickett's Mill and that probably explained why its advance was so tentative.

The new defense line of Hardee's corps faced west while the defenses manned by Loring's corps faced north. Therefore, it was possible for Union artillery to enfilade both Walker's division on Hardee's right and French's division on Loring's left. Johnston recognized this defect and asked his engineering officer Stephen Presstman to prepare a new defense line. After a few days of clear weather, on June 18 it began to rain again so that by the end of the day Mud and Noonday Creeks swelled into small rivers. Early on June 18, Howard advanced the divisions of Wood and Newton so that their heavy skirmish line overran the outworks in front of them and captured 50 Confederates. On his own initiative, brigade commander Charles Garrison Harker secured the captured ground and Howard directed Newton's entire division to support the move. The actions of Wood's and Newton's divisions against the salient held by French and Walker are known as the Battle of Latimer's Farm, and resulted in 200 Confederate casualties.

== Aftermath ==
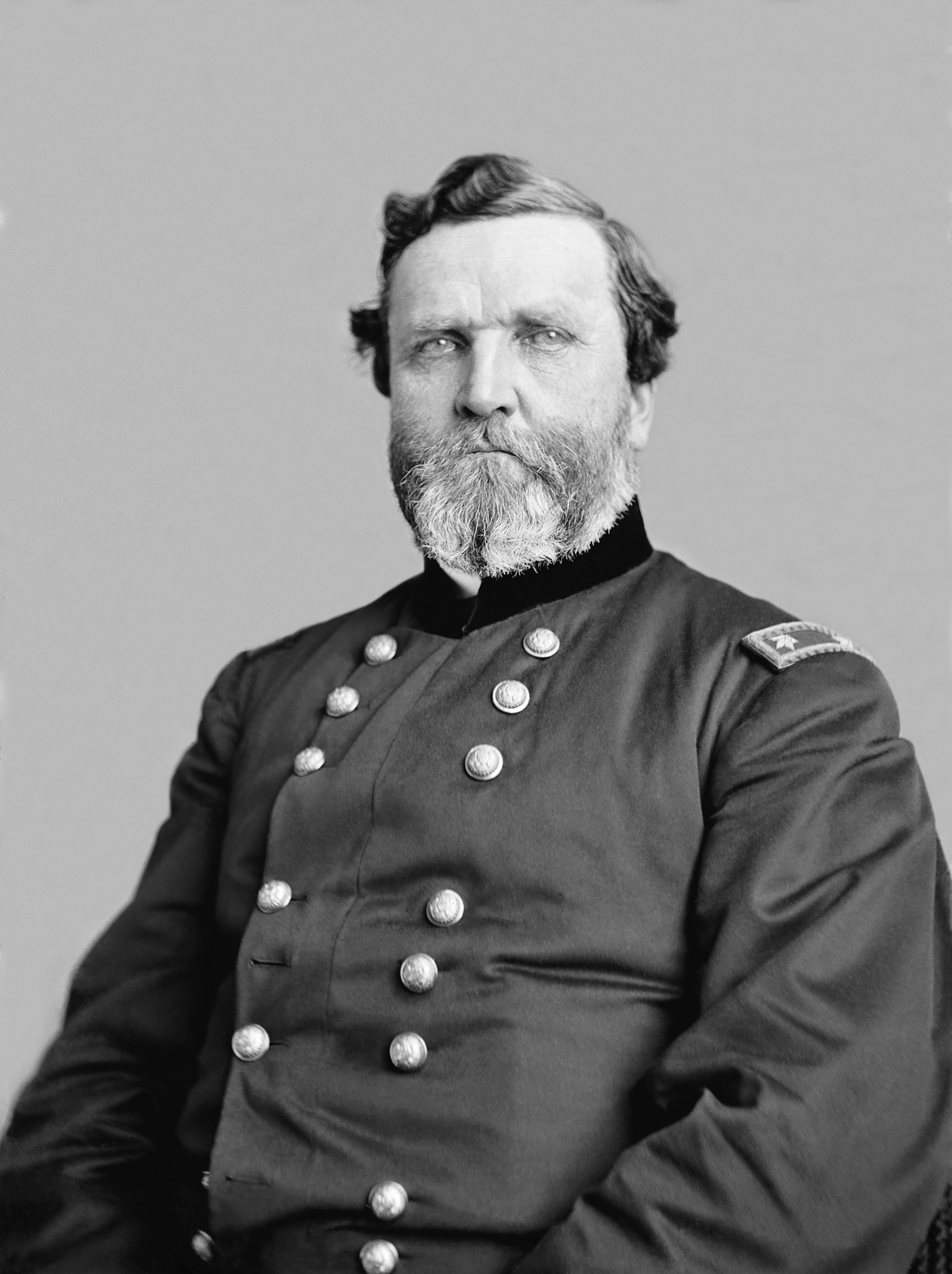
George H. Thomas

On the night of June 18–19, Johnston's army fell back to another line of entrenchments based on Kennesaw Mountain. Johnston's infantry lines ran 7 mi (11.3 km) from Hood's corps on the right to Hardee's corps on the left, which was behind Noses Creek. Loring's corps defended the mountain in the center. The defensive position was probably stronger than anything seen so far by Sherman's forces. Hood's corps defended the area east of the railroad. Loring's divisions were, from left to right, French, Edward C. Walthall (formerly Cantey), and Winfield S. Featherston (formerly Loring). Hardee's divisions were, from left to right, Cheatham, Cleburne, Bate, and Walker. The next actions were the Battle of Kolb's Farm on June 22 and the Battle of Kennesaw Mountain on June 27.

Sherman dutifully telegraphed frequent reports to Union army Chief of Staff Henry Halleck in Washington, D.C. On the night of June 18, Sherman sent his first letter to General-in-Chief Ulysses S. Grant since the campaign began. Sherman excused his slow progress by explaining that McPherson fumbled his opportunity to envelop Johnston's army at Resaca, but admitted that McPherson had done well since then. He also expressed disappointment with his cavalry commanders, calling Stoneman lazy and Garrard overly cautious. But Sherman reserved his sharpest criticism for Thomas, who he knew Grant did not like, and his army. He wrote, "My chief source of trouble is with the Army of the Cumberland, which is awful slow. A fresh furrow in a plowed field will stop the whole column, and all begin to intrench. I have again and again tried to impress on Thomas that we must assail and not defend; we are on the offensive, and yet it seems the whole Army of the Cumberland is so habituated to be on the defensive that, from its commander down to the lowest private, I cannot get it out of their heads." Author Albert E. Castel insisted that Sherman's comment was unfair.

As Cox explained in his history published 18 years later, starting with the Battle of New Hope Church (May 25), the troops on both sides entrenched themselves as soon as they reached an advanced position. This was because the soldiers came to realize that, "one man in the trench [was] fully equal to three or four in the assault". Once a Union formation reached a new position, a line of skirmishers was deployed, the officers marked out the most effective defense line, and each infantry company was responsible for constructing its own breastwork or trench. Trees were cut down for their logs, which were used to build breastworks. A ditch was dug in front and the earth from the ditch was piled up in front of the logs to protect them from artillery fire. A head-log was placed on top which provided the soldiers with a narrow firing slit. In front of the fortified line, a belt of abatis was created by cutting down trees and shrubs so that their branches pointed at any attackers. Cox estimated that it took one hour for veterans to construct such field fortifications. Confederate soldiers used similar methods, except that Black slaves and the Georgia militia were employed to construct many of their entrenched lines.

== Notes ==
Footnotes

Citations
