= Battle of Kolb's Farm =

Battle of the American Civil War

Coordinates: 33.91012°N 84.59757°W

- Part of the American Civil War
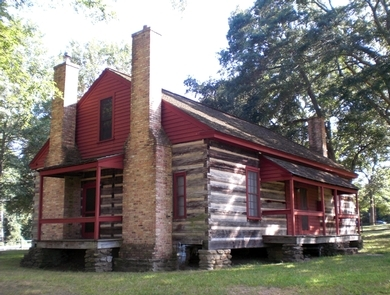
- Kolb's Farmhouse as it appeared in 2015
Date	June 22, 1864
Location	Cobb County, near Marietta, Georgia
Result	Union tactical victory

Belligerents
United States (Union)	(Confederate States of America) CSA (Confederacy)

Commanders and leaders
John M. Schofield; Joseph Hooker	John B. Hood

Units involved
Army of the Ohio (XXIII Corps); XX Corps	Hood's Corps

Strength
14,000	11,000

Casualties and losses
250	1,500

The Battle of Kolb's Farm (June 22, 1864) saw a Confederate corps under Lieutenant General John B. Hood attack parts of two Union corps under Major Generals Joseph Hooker and John Schofield. This action was part of the Atlanta campaign of the American Civil War fought between the Confederate Army of Tennessee led by General Joseph E. Johnston and Union forces commanded by Major General William Tecumseh Sherman. Hood believed that he had an opportunity to inflict a defeat on the Union forces in front of his corps and ordered an assault. However, Hooker's and Schofield's troops were deployed in good positions and they repulsed Hood's soldiers with serious losses.

After Hooker made his battle report, a dispute arose between him and Sherman. This was caused by an exaggerated claim made by Hooker and a probable misunderstanding on Sherman's part. Already there was mistrust between the two generals and the dispute only made relations worse. Though the Union won a tactical victory at Kolb's Farm, Sherman's maneuver to turn the Confederate left flank appeared to be blocked. Frustrated in his attempts to outflank Johnston's army, Sherman ordered a frontal assault five days later.

== Background ==
=== Union Army ===
General-in-chief of the Union Army Lieutenant General Ulysses S. Grant ordered Sherman, "to move against Johnston's army, to break it up, and to get into the interior of the enemy's country as far as you can, inflicting all the damage you can against their war resources".

Sherman commanded elements of three armies. The Army of the Cumberland under Major General George H. Thomas was made up of the IV Corps led by Major General Oliver Otis Howard, the XIV Corps under Major General John M. Palmer, the XX Corps commanded by Major General Joseph Hooker, and three cavalry divisions led by Brigadier Generals Edward M. McCook, Kenner Garrard, and Hugh Judson Kilpatrick. The Army of the Tennessee led by Major General James B. McPherson included the XV Corps under Major General John A. Logan, the Left Wing of the XVI Corps under Major General Grenville M. Dodge, and the XVII Corps under Major General Francis Preston Blair Jr. The Army of the Ohio commanded by Major General John Schofield consisted of the XXIII Corps under Schofield and a cavalry division commanded by Major General George Stoneman.

Sherman began his campaign with almost 100,000 men, including Thomas' 60,000 and 130 guns, McPherson's 25,000 and 96 guns, and Schofield's 14,000 men and 28 guns. Through the fighting near Dallas, Sherman lost 12,000 casualties, but was reinforced by the fresh XVII Corps at that time.

=== Confederate Army ===
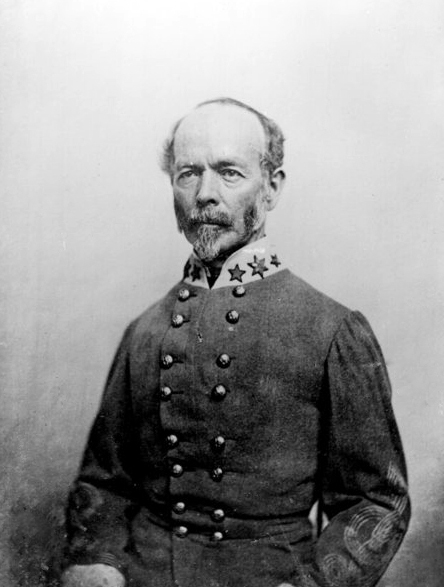
Joseph Johnston

Johnston's Army of Tennessee began the campaign with two infantry corps led by Lieutenant Generals William J. Hardee and John Bell Hood, and a cavalry corps under Major General Joseph Wheeler. The army was soon reinforced from the Army of Mississippi by the corps of Lieutenant General Leonidas Polk and the cavalry division of Brigadier General William Hicks Jackson.

Polk was killed at Pine Mountain on June 14 and temporarily replaced by Major General William Wing Loring. Hardee's corps included the divisions of Major Generals William B. Bate, Benjamin F. Cheatham, Patrick Cleburne, and William H. T. Walker. Hood's corps comprised the divisions of Major Generals Thomas C. Hindman, Carter L. Stevenson, and Alexander P. Stewart. Polk's corps was made up of the divisions of Major Generals Edward C. Walthall and Samuel Gibbs French, and Brigadier General Winfield S. Featherston.

As recently as the Battle of Cassville on May 19, the Confederate army had numbered 70,000–74,000 troops. Since then, Johnston's army sustained about 3,000 casualties in the fighting near Dallas.

=== Previous operations ===
The Atlanta campaign began on May 7, 1864, when Sherman's forces began to advance. Sherman sent McPherson's army on a wide swing to the west while the armies under Thomas and Schofield pressed Johnston's defenses frontally. After the Battle of Rocky Face Ridge, Johnston withdrew from the Dalton position. The Battle of Resaca occurred on May 13–16, after which Johnston retreated again.

After a skirmish at Adairsville, Johnston tried to set a trap for Sherman's forces, which were advancing on a broad front. At the Battle of Cassville on May 19, Johnston's attempted counterstroke miscarried and the Confederate army withdrew the next day. Since the Confederate defenses at Allatoona Pass were too strong, Sherman tried to turn Johnston's position by a wide sweep to the west. This resulted in a series of actions in late May known as the battles of New Hope Church, Pickett's Mill, and Dallas. The Union forces then shifted to the east and finally forced Johnston to order another retreat.

In mid-June, a series of actions took place near Gilgal Church and Pine Mountain, after which Johnston fell back to Kennesaw Mountain.

=== Kennesaw ===
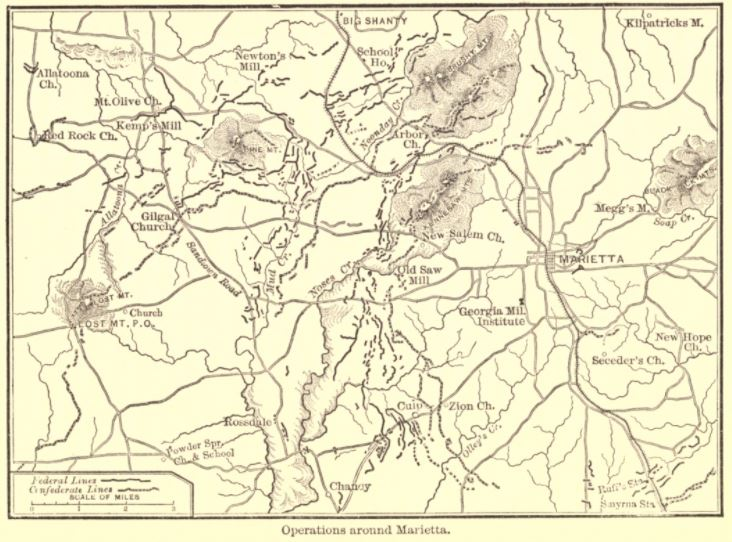
Operations around Marietta map from Jacob D. Cox's Atlanta shows Kolb's Farm labeled as Culp at the lower center.

Kennesaw Mountain represented the key to the Confederate defenses. The railroad coming from the north veered to the northeast past Kennesaw's northern end, then turned south before reaching Marietta.

The mountain ridge runs northeast to southwest with three notable features. These are Big Kennesaw, which stands 691 ft (211 m) above the surrounding terrain at the northeast end, Little Kennesaw with its nearly 400 ft (122 m) summit, and Pigeon Hill with its 200 ft (61 m) height at the southwest end. From Big Kennesaw's dominating summit, any daytime movements by the Union forces could be immediately observed. Kennesaw Mountain was probably a stronger position than Rocky Face Ridge and Allatoona Pass.

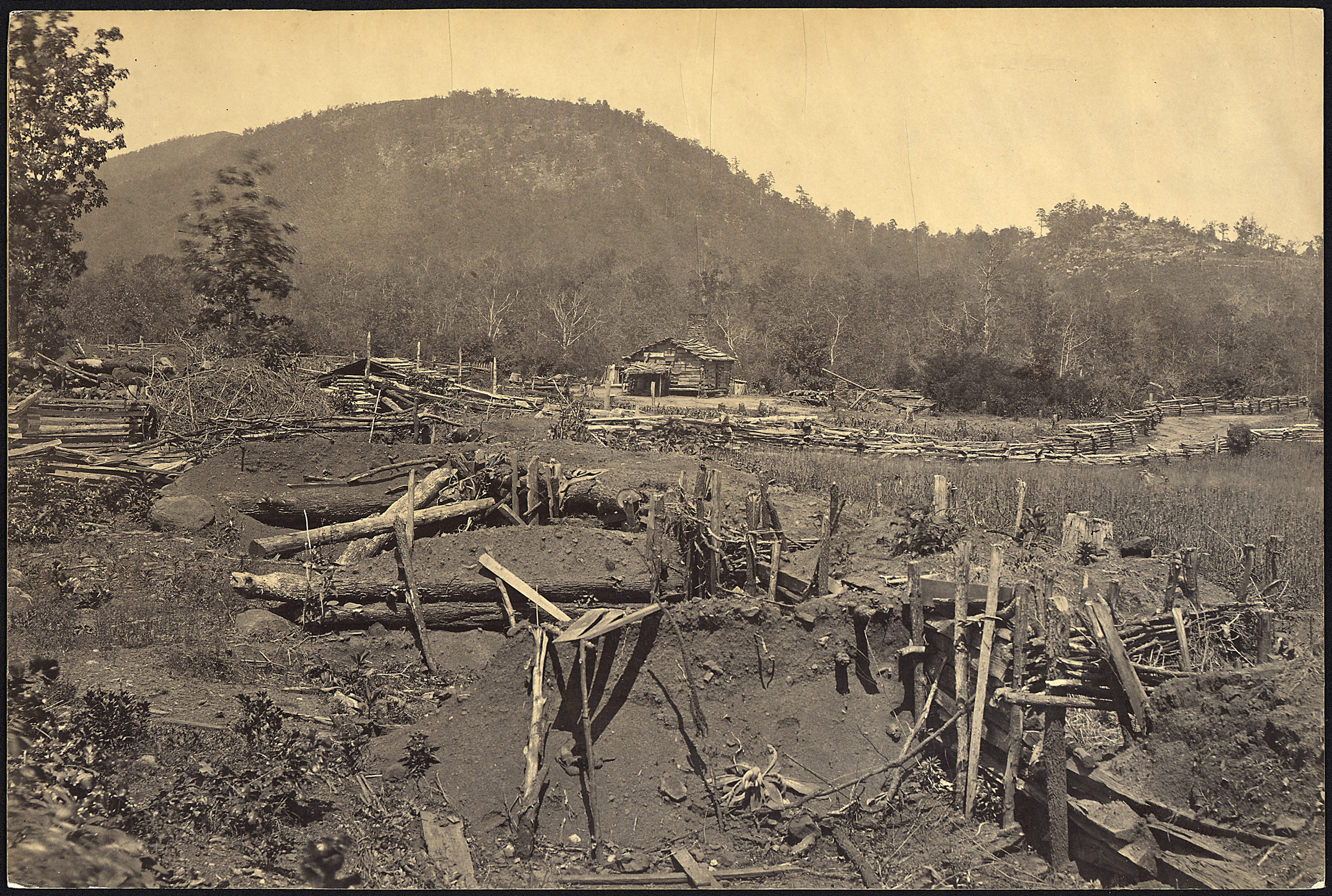
Wartime photograph by George N. Barnard shows Kennesaw Mountain.

Hood's corps held the Confederate right flank east of Kennesaw Mountain and north of Marietta. Loring's corps held the mountain in the center, with Featherston's division on the right, Walthall's division in the center, and French's division on the left. Hardee's corps held the left flank, with the divisions of Walker, Bate, Cleburne, and Cheatham deployed from right to left. Hardee's troops were posted behind Noses Creek, which was swollen from the recent heavy rains. In front of the main Confederate defenses was a fortified outpost line. The Confederate infantry defended a 7 mi (11 km) long front. Wheeler's cavalry guarded the right flank while Jackson's cavalry watched the left flank.

On the morning of June 19, Sherman optimistically believed that the Confederates had withdrawn to the Chattahoochie River, but by the day's end he realized that assessment was wrong. McPherson's three corps formed the Federal left wing, with Blair's corps on the extreme left flank. Thomas' army advanced with Palmer's corps on the left, Howard's corps in the center, and Hooker's corps on the right. On the Union right wing, Schofield's corps marched southeast along the Sandtown Road. There was a vigorous cavalry clash on the left between Garrard's division and Wheeler. Hooker was able to cross Noses Creek at a place where the stream curved to the west, and established his corps on the east side of the creek. Schofield reached the place where the road from Powder Springs Church to Marietta spanned Noses Creek, but did not attempt to cross.

Federal cannons took Pigeon Hill under fire, inflicting 35 casualties on French's Missouri brigade, including its commander Brigadier General Francis Cockrell. French responded by having his gun crews drag their cannons up Pigeon Hill.

On June 20, Sherman began extending his right wing toward the south. Howard ordered Brigadier General Thomas J. Wood's division and a brigade from Major General David S. Stanley's division to replace the left flank of Hooker's corps. Brigadier General Alpheus S. Williams's division on Hooker's left shifted to the right flank of the corps. Later, Stanley's other brigades were able to cross to the west bank of Noses Creek. They seized two hills and were counterattacked by Confederates who recaptured one of them.

Stanley's division suffered 250 casualties in the fighting. Since it rained again that day, Sherman decided not to try any attacks until the weather cleared. Brigadier General Jacob Dolson Cox's division of Schofield's corps made a successful crossing of Noses Creek and entrenched on the east side. The constant rain caused many sick soldiers in both Union and Confederate armies to be evacuated to the rear.

== Battle ==
=== June 21 movements ===
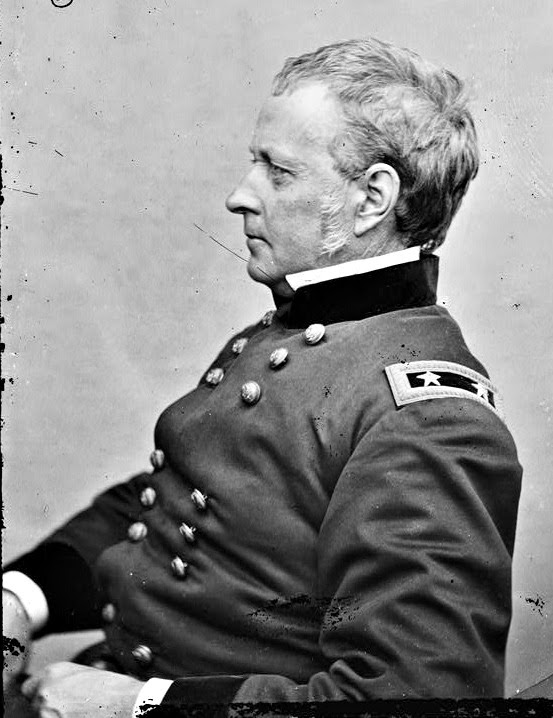
Joseph Hooker

On June 21, Sherman's army continued shifting to its right. McPherson's Army of the Tennessee relieved part of Thomas' Army of the Cumberland. Palmer's corps replaced Brigadier General John Newton's division of Howard's corps. In turn, Newton's division took over the left flank of Hooker's corps, allowing it to extend to the right. Howard's corps retook the hill previously captured by the Confederates and seized ground which enabled it to advance several hundred yards. Hooker's corps pushed forward at the same time, occupying some hills near Kolb's (also known as Culp's) Farm while maintaining contact with Howard's corps on its left.

Brigadier General Milo S. Hascall's division of Schofield's corps crossed Noses Creek and made contact with the right flank of Hooker's corps. Stoneman's horsemen clashed with Jackson's division on Schofield's right flank.

Johnston noted Sherman's extension of his right wing and decided that Hardee's lines had been stretched almost to their limit. Therefore, he decided to counter it by moving Hood's corps from his right to his left flank. To fill the gap, Johnston ordered Loring to extend his corps to its right and instructed Wheeler to dismount his cavalrymen to man Hood's trenches.

Johnston knew that McPherson might attack his weakened right flank, but all Sherman's recent moves were by the Union right flank. Johnston decided to accept the risk because he felt that his only other alternative was to retreat. In the morning of June 21, Schofield believed that the way to Marietta was unguarded. However, by the evening, Schofield suspected that he was facing substantial opposition. In fact, Hood's corps left its original position in the morning and camped on the Powder Springs road west of Marietta in the evening.

=== June 22 action ===
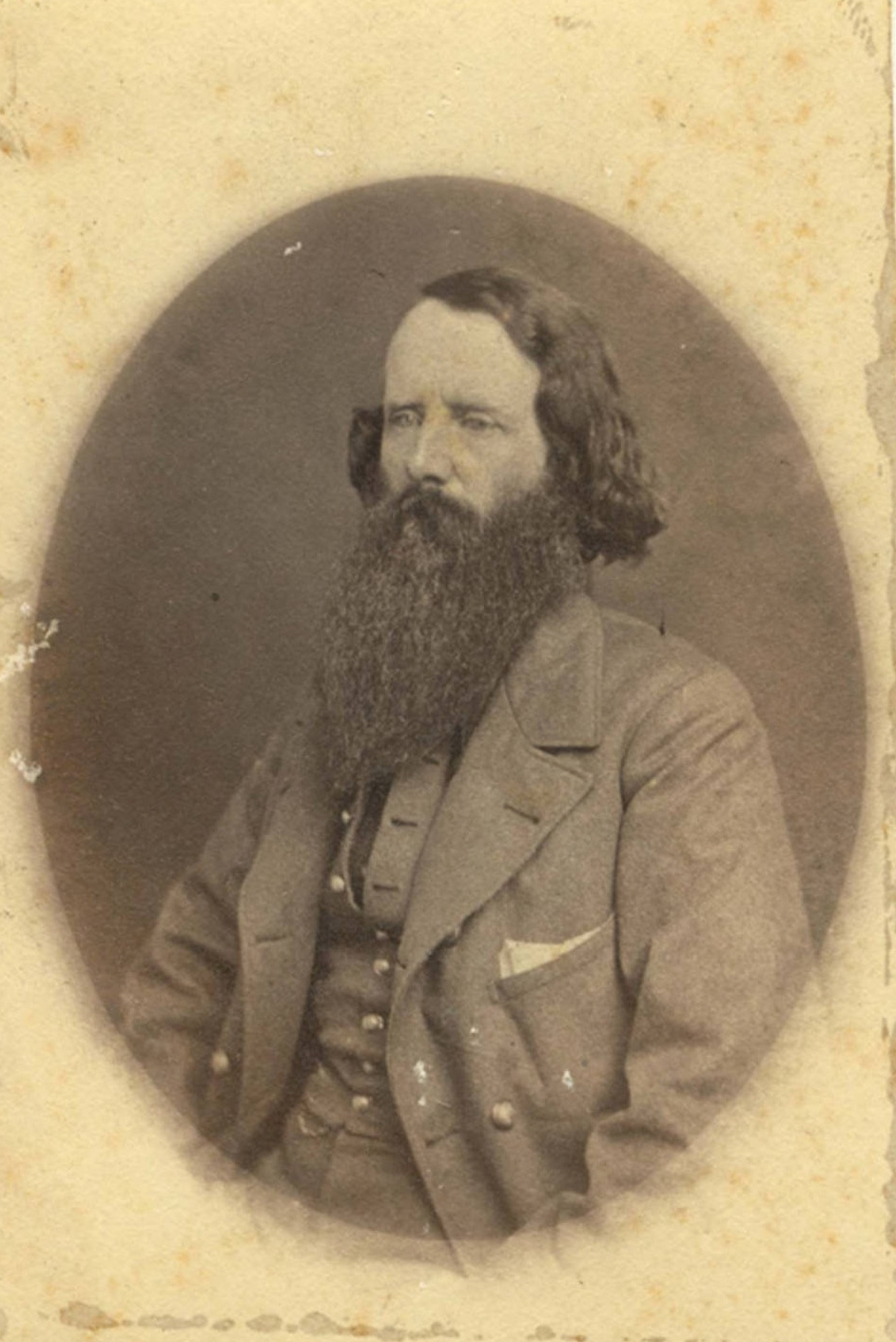
Carter Stevenson

June 22 dawned with clear skies, so Sherman decided to make a major effort to force Johnston to retreat. He ordered Thomas to direct Hooker to move his corps east toward Marietta. Sherman instructed Schofield to advance along the Powder Springs-Marietta road before linking with Hooker's right flank, and to guard the Cheney House where the Sandtown road met the Powder Springs road. Early in the afternoon, Hooker advanced with Major General Daniel Butterfield's division on the left, Brigadier General John W. Geary in the center, and Williams on the right. Soon, Hooker's skirmishers reported that Confederates were ahead and forming for an attack. This information prompted Hooker to order his corps to entrench on a line from Howard's right flank to Kolb's Farm on the Powder Springs-Marietta road. South of the road facing east, Colonel Silas A. Strickland's brigade of Hascall's XXIII Corps division also fortified its position. The rest of Hascall's brigades were to Strickland's right and facing southeast. Farther south was Cox's division guarding the area near Cheney House.

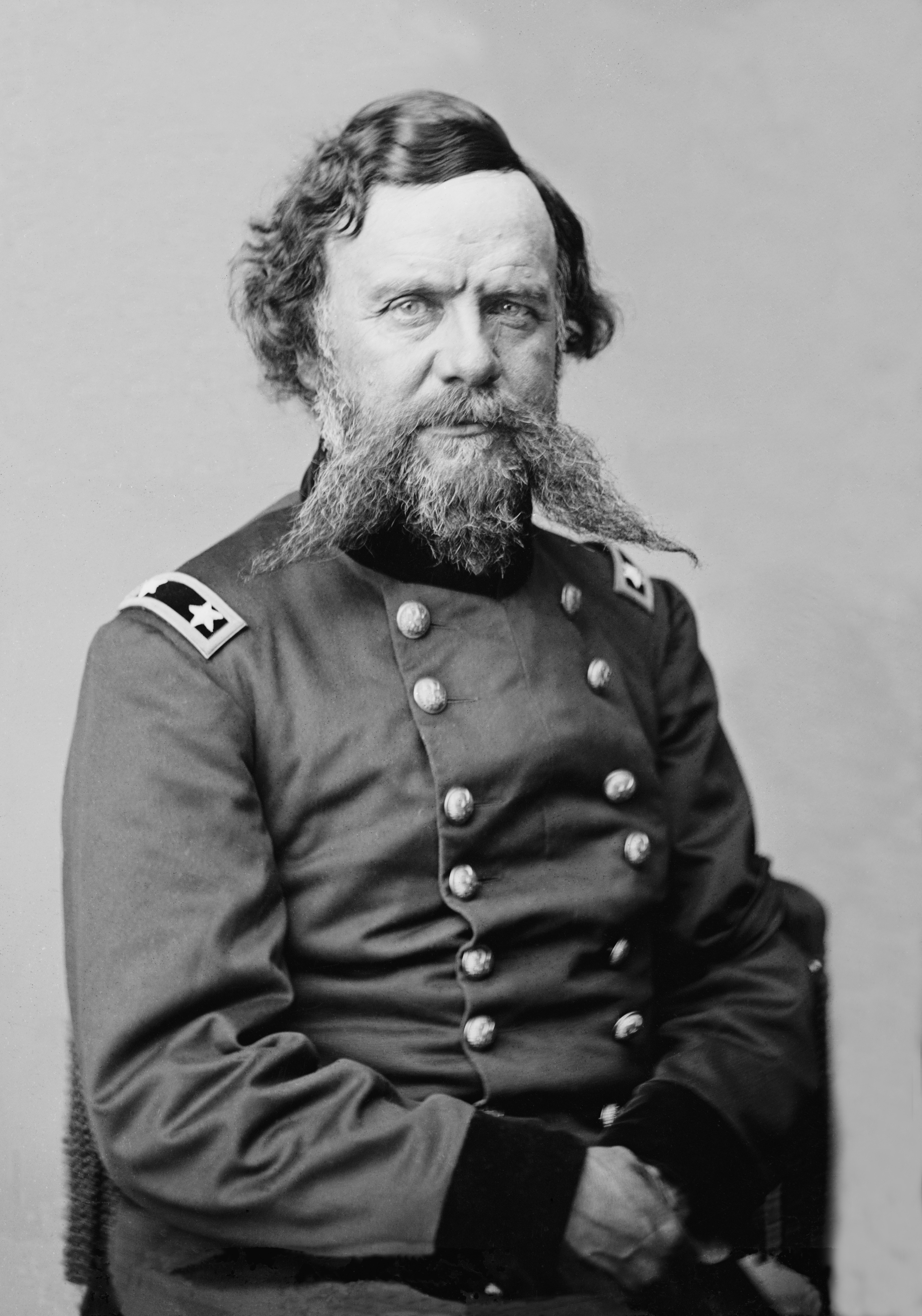
Alpheus Williams

In the Atlanta campaign to date, Hooker's XX Corps suffered 5,000 casualties, more than any other of Sherman's formations, after starting with 20,000 men.

Williams' division was deployed with the brigades of Brigadier Generals Thomas H. Ruger and Joseph F. Knipe on the right and center, and Colonel James S. Robinson's brigade on the left.

Williams sent the 123rd New York Infantry Regiment forward into the woods on a reconnaissance, while Hascall ordered the 14th Kentucky Infantry Regiment on the same mission. Both units pressed forward to positions where they saw large numbers of Confederates massing for an attack, and they reported this information. Hooker twice asked Thomas to reinforce his corps, claiming the "whole rebel army" was in front of him. This prompted Thomas to personally look over the situation. He concluded that the threat was exaggerated, and that Hooker's line was sufficiently strong to defend itself.

On Geary's right there was a hill surrounded by open fields; this was entrenched and crowned with artillery. Small marshy streams ran between Williams' brigades and in the interval between Geary and Williams.

Hascall's division consisted of the brigades of Colonels John McQuiston, William E. Hobson, and Strickland. Schofield, who was with Hascall when the 14th Kentucky's report came in, ordered Cox to leave one brigade at Cheney House and march to Hascall's support. Leaving Colonel James W. Reilly's brigade, Cox marched with the three others, but the action was over before they went very far. They were then placed to the right of Hascall's brigades. Cox's brigades were led by Colonels Daniel Cameron, Richard F. Barter, Robert K. Byrd, and Reilly. (Note: Brigadier General Alvin P. Hovey's 1st Division was suppressed and its brigades were temporarily assigned to the divisions of Hascall and Cox. (Battles & Leaders, pp. 288–289))

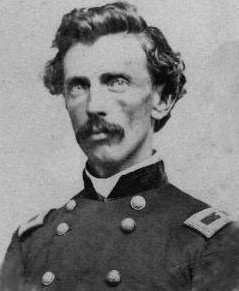
Milo Hascall

During the early afternoon of June 22, Hood's corps moved along the Powder Springs road until it was 0.5 mi (805 m) west of Mount Zion Church. Hood then deployed his corps with Stevenson's division athwart the road, Hindman's division to its right, and Stewart's division directly behind Stevenson. Hood ordered his division commanders to drive the Federals toward Manning's Mill, which was 2 mi (3.2 km) west of Kolb's Farm. Hood sent a message to Johnston claiming incorrectly that he defeated a Union attack and that he was counterattacking. Hood's daily report was unclear about what happened that day, his memoirs never referred to the Kolb's Farm action, and other Confederate sources were silent. Therefore, Hood's motives that day can only be inferred. Apparently, he believed that the Federals were advancing in march column and that his troops were executing a powerful flank attack against an unready opponent. The Confederate assault began a short time after 5 pm.

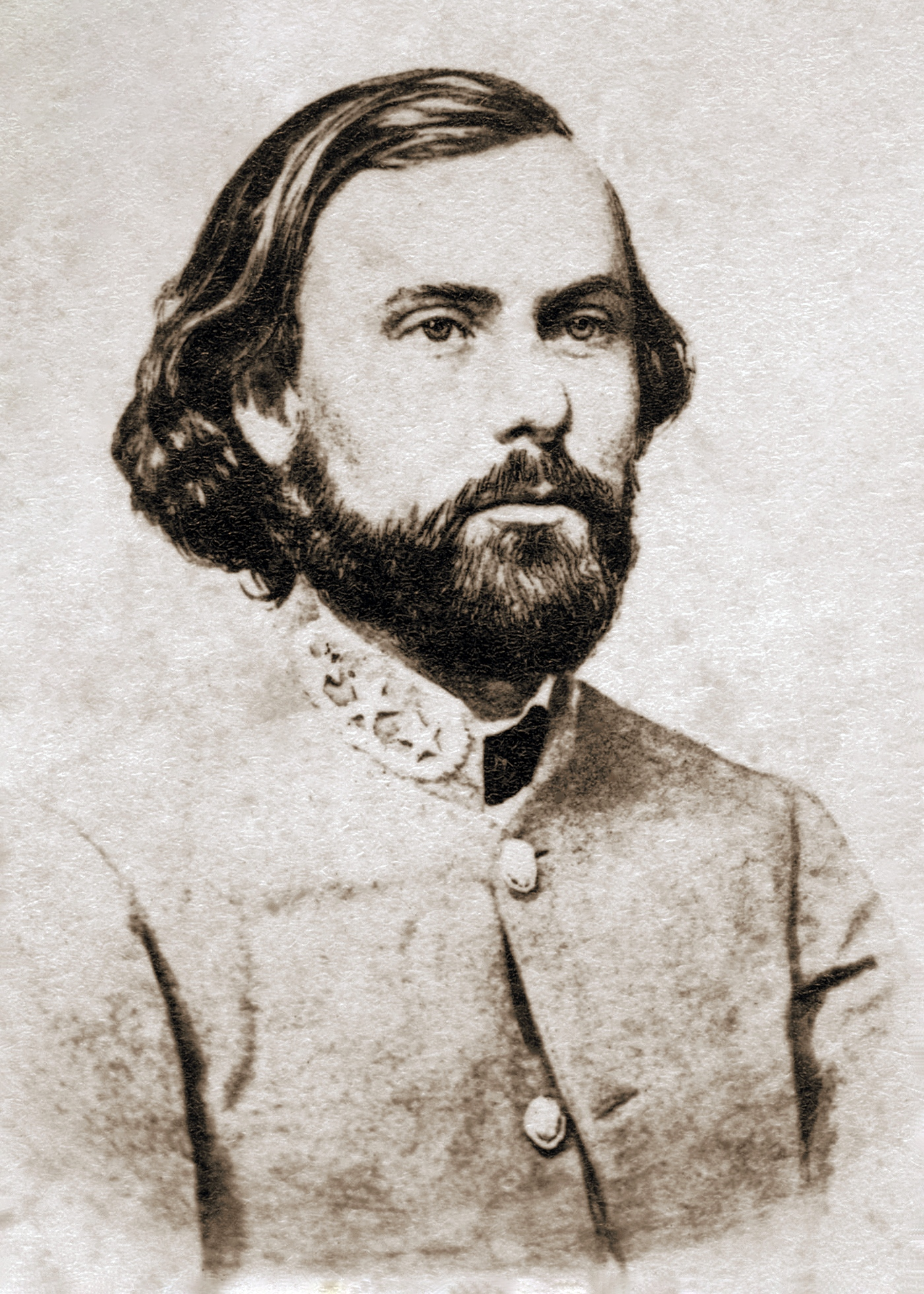
Thomas Hindman

Stevenson arranged his division with the brigades of Brigadier Generals Alfred Cumming and Edmund Pettus on the left with Cumming in front. On the right were the brigades of Brigadier Generals John C. Brown and Alexander W. Reynolds on the right, with Brown in front. Cumming's brigade, which consisted largely of former Georgia militia, advanced through dense foliage until they received a volley from the 14th Kentucky at a range of 30 ft (9.1 m).

Cumming's troops retreated in confusion, rallied, attacked again, and were repulsed a second time. Outflanked when the 123rd New York was driven back, the 14th Kentucky fell back to a second position and continued to resist. Finally, Hascall peremptorily ordered the 14th Kentucky to withdraw to the main line; its commander Colonel George Gallup later claimed that 69 dead Confederates were found in front of his regiment's position. When the Confederates attacked Strickland's defenses, they were driven off by rifle fire and by canister shot from Shields' 19th Ohio Battery and Paddock's Battery F, 1st Michigan.

North of the road, Brown's and Reynolds' troops quickly drove back the 123rd New York and advanced into cleared fields in front of the brigades of Ruger and Knipe. When the Confederates emerged they were pounded by the 13th New York Battery from Geary's hill. These guns were joined by the 3-inch Ordnance rifles of Winegar's Battery I, 1st New York and the 12-pounder Napoleons of Woodbury's Battery M, 1st New York from Williams' division. Stevenson's soldiers were briefly able to penetrate a hollow between Williams and Geary, but were soon compelled to recoil under the combined rifle and artillery fire. During the attack, Hooker asked for Howard to release Butterfield's division, but it could not be moved immediately. Instead, Howard sent a few reserve regiments to Hooker's aid. Later that night, Howard finally released Butterfield's division. While most of Stevenson's men fell back to the woods, some soldiers took cover in a ravine. It soon proved to be a death trap when it became the target of one of Williams' batteries.

Hindman's division stormed out of the woods after Stevenson's men began to retreat. The division moved toward Robinson's brigade and Geary's right flank. Hindman's left flank was composed of the brigades of Brigadier Generals Zachariah C. Deas and William F. Tucker. These formations halted as soon as they came under artillery fire and fled in confusion. Hindman's right flank consisted of the brigades of Brigadier Generals Edward C. Walthall and Arthur Middleton Manigault. Walthall's men went to ground as soon as they came under fire. Manigault's troops faced a patch of marshy ground in the area that complicated their advance. After trying and failing to cross a boggy creek under heavy fire, the soldiers either fled or took cover. According to Williams' account, Hindman's division was repulsed by artillery alone, Williams's infantry having taken no part in the fighting in that area.

== Aftermath ==
=== Losses ===
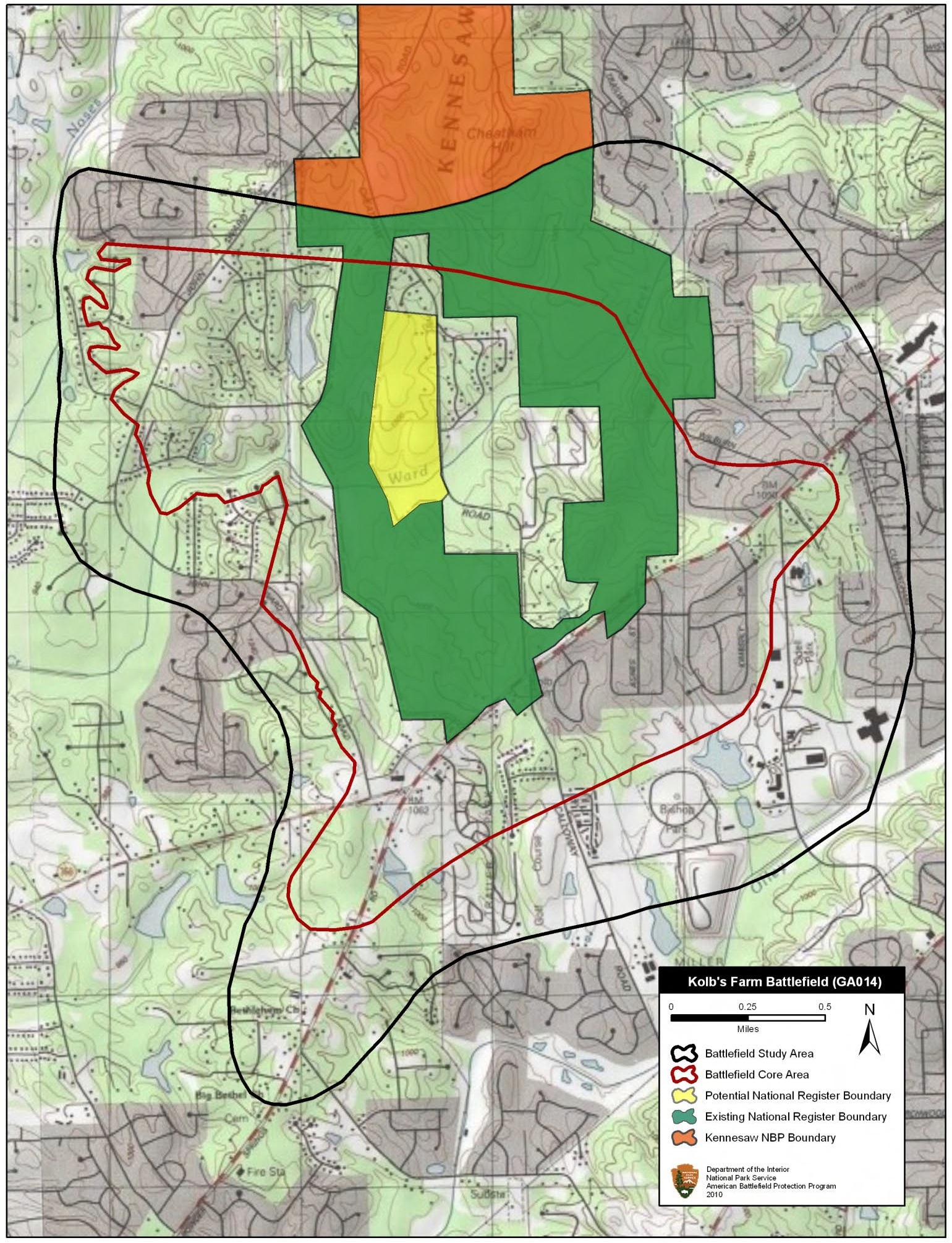
Map of Kolb's Farm Battlefield core and study areas by the American Battlefield Protection Program.

Johnston admitted losing 1,000 troops in the battle. Williams reported sustaining 130 casualties, while Hascall's loss was about the same. Geary's losses were "trifling". Historian Albert E. Castel estimated that Hood's attack cost his corps 1,500 killed, wounded, and missing, two-thirds of which were from Stevenson's division. Castel calculated that total Union casualties were 250, of which 86 were from Knipe's brigade and 72 were from Strickland's brigade. The 123rd New York lost 48 casualties while the 14th Kentucky lost 12 killed and 48 wounded. Castel called the action, "more a one-sided slaughter than a battle". The above losses were echoed by an article by Scott Wilbur for the National Park Service. Wilbur also stated that the Union forces engaged in the action outnumbered Hood by 14,000 to 11,000. (Note: The author did not state how the numbers 14,000 and 11,000 were arrived at.)

=== Sherman-Hooker dispute ===
Sherman told Schofield that, "I will probably meet you today at Mrs. Kolb's." Nevertheless, Sherman spent the day with the corps of Howard and Palmer. At 5:30 pm, Hooker received a message from Sherman asking, "How are you getting along? Near what house are you?" Sherman had heard some cannon fire, but it did not seem like anything serious. Sherman returned to his headquarters at Big Shanty that evening. Hooker immediately replied but his message was unaccountably delayed. At 9:30 pm, Sherman finally received Hooker's note, which read as follows.

We have repulsed two heavy attacks and feel confident, our only apprehension being our extreme right flank. Three entire corps are in front of us.

Sherman wondered why Hooker was anxious about his right flank since Schofield's corps was supposed to be there. He did not understand how he could have missed the sound of "two heavy attacks". At 9:30 pm, Sherman issued a reply to Hooker.

Dispatch received. Schofield was ordered this morning to be on the Powder Springs and Marietta road in close support of your right. Is this not the case? There cannot be three corps in your front. Johnston has but three corps, and I know from personal inspection that a full proportion is now and has been all day on his right and center.

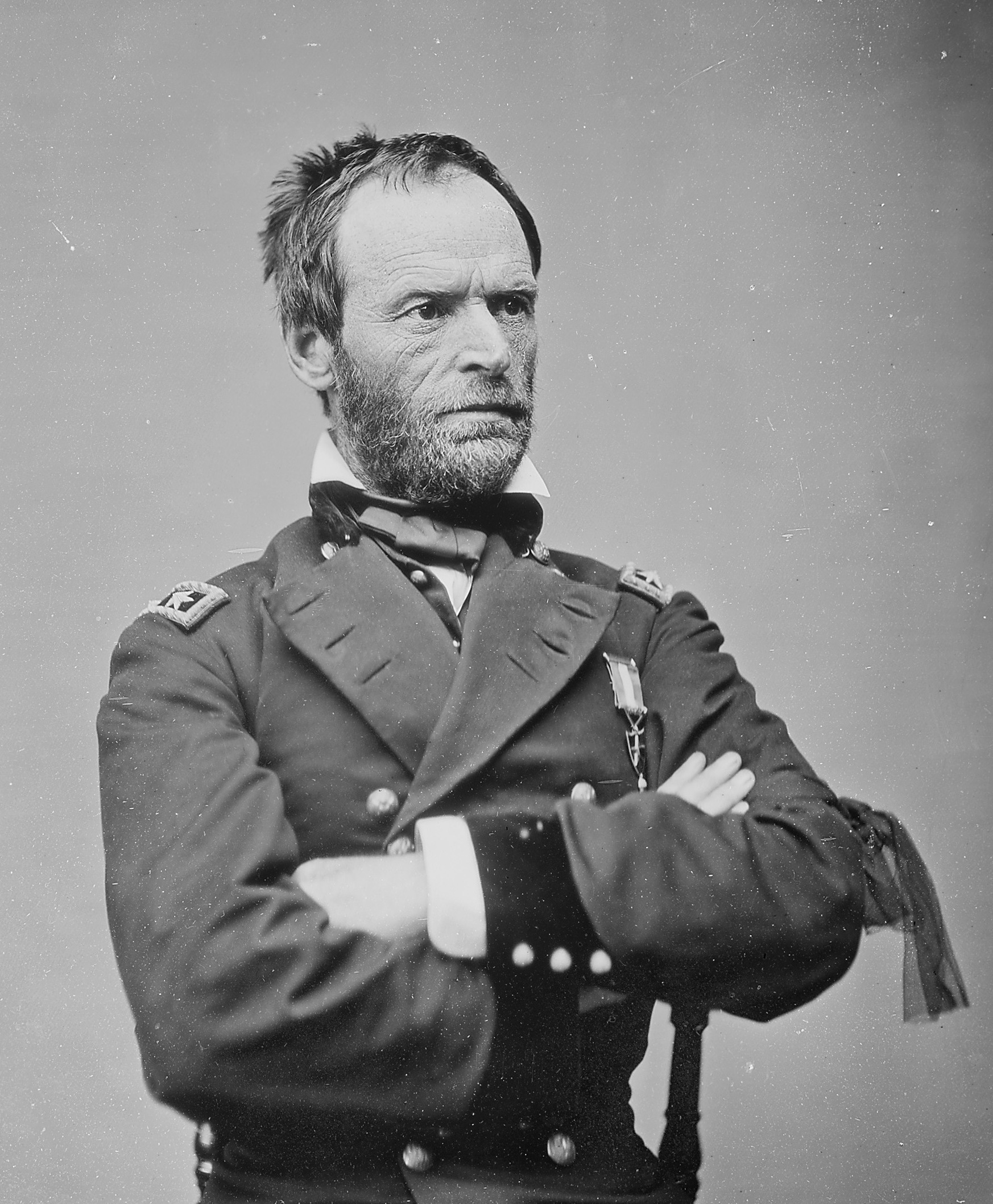
William T. Sherman

Sherman sent Thomas a message asking him to make sure Schofield was on Hooker's right. Thomas sent two replies saying that the situation on the right flank was under control, and suggesting that only weak Confederate forces must be in front of McPherson. Finally, Sherman received a message from Schofield reporting that Hood's corps attacked his and Hooker's positions at Kolb's Farm and was defeated. According to Sherman's Memoirs, written ten years after the war, he rode to the right flank on the morning of June 23 to meet with Schofield and Hooker. When he presented Hooker's message, Schofield became angry, saying his troops were in their proper position on the right. Sherman wrote that he chided Hooker for claiming three corps were in front of him.

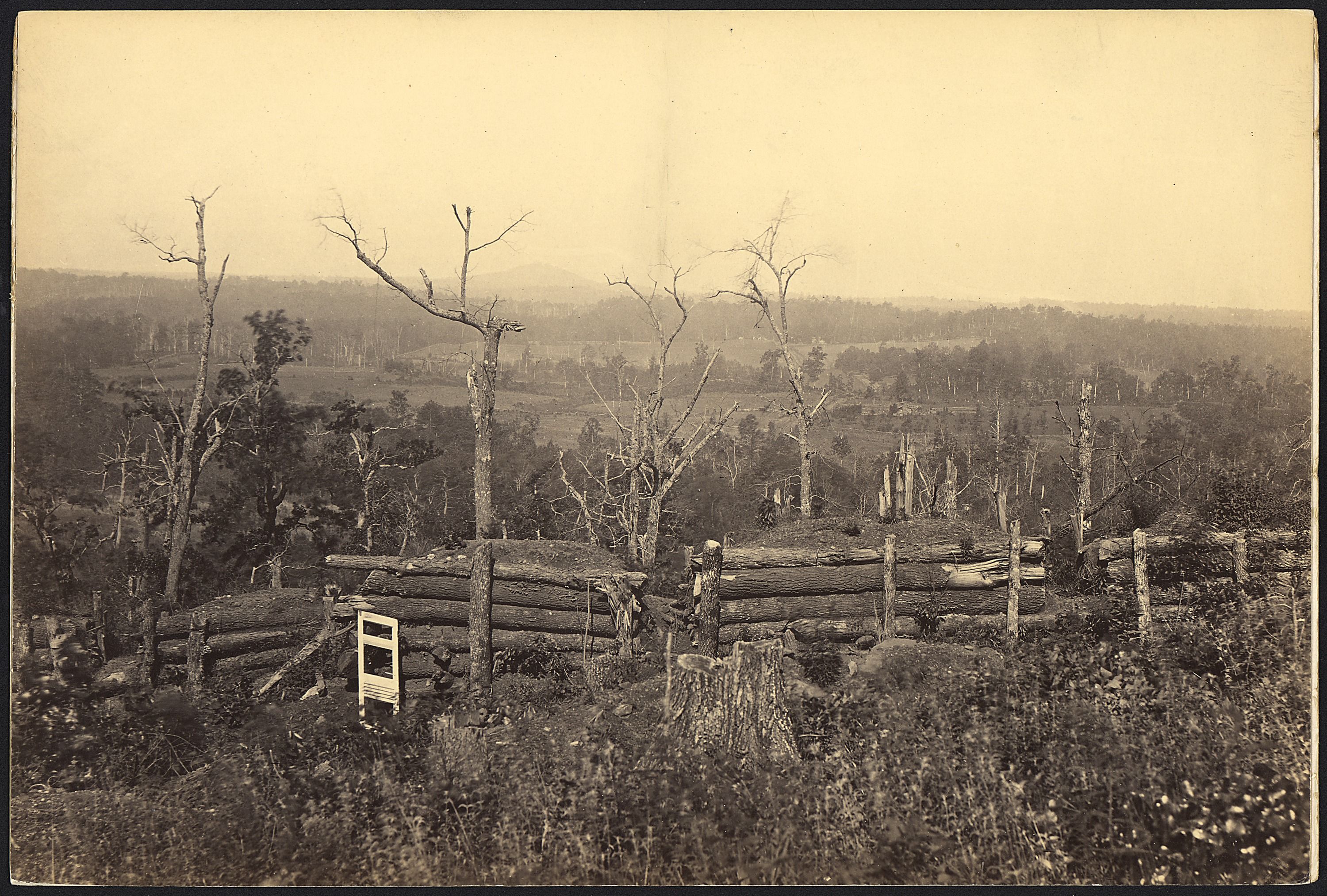
Fieldworks near Kennesaw Mountain

Castel asserted that the account in Sherman's Memoirs was the product of faulty memory and personal animosity toward Hooker. Schofield later denied being angry with Hooker, and suggested that Sherman must have misunderstood Hooker's message. In fact, in Hooker's report to Thomas at midnight, he credited Hascall for helping to repulse Hood's assault. Schofield wrote that he did not recall meeting with Sherman in the morning and perhaps the commanding general met with Hascall instead. Hooker's claim that he faced three corps was absurd, but there was an element of truth to it. While Hood's corps was in front of Hooker and Schofield, part of Hardee's corps opposed Butterfield's division, and one of the Confederate cavalry brigades in the area originally belonged to the Army of Mississippi, that is, Loring's corps. In any case, once the action began, Hooker performed superbly as a combat leader.

Hooker already resented Sherman's obvious favoritism toward McPherson's Army of the Tennessee. He also believed that Sherman mishandled his corps at the Battle of New Hope Church. The Kolb's Farm incident led to a steady decline in Hooker's standing with Sherman. When McPherson was killed on July 22, Hooker expected to be promoted to command the Army of the Tennessee, since he was senior in rank. Doubting that Hooker would prove to be a cooperative and loyal subordinate, Sherman passed over him and selected Howard to replace McPherson. Hooker found this especially insulting because he blamed Howard for his defeat at the Battle of Chancellorsville. Hooker promptly tendered his resignation, which Sherman accepted.

=== Sherman frustrated ===
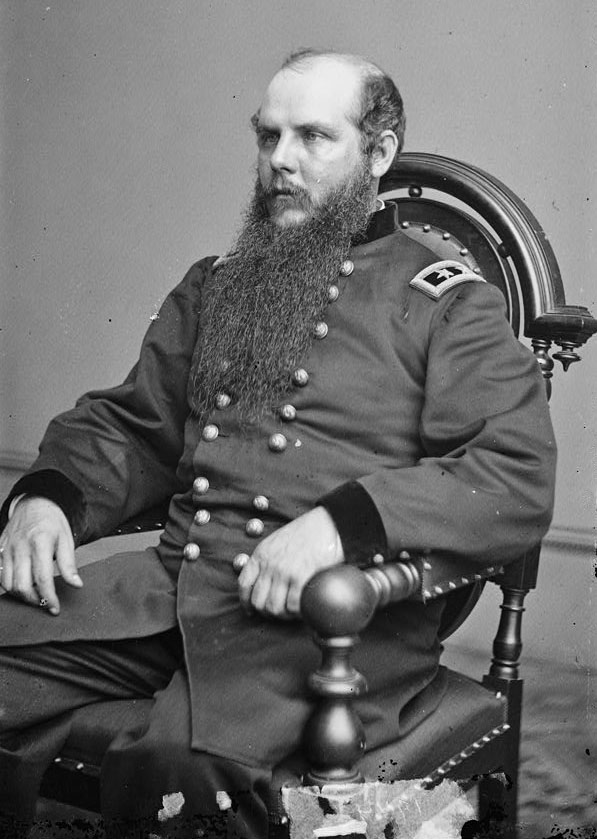
John Schofield

By the following day, Hood's corps entrenched itself and it was clear that assaulting it would be foolish. Sherman instructed Schofield to find whether the Confederate left flank could be turned. On the afternoon of June 23, Reilly's brigade moved south along the Sandtown road to where it crossed Olley's Creek. Reilly found dismounted and barricaded soldiers from Brigadier General Lawrence Sullivan Ross' cavalry brigade defending the crossing. Schofield reported to Sherman that his corps was extended too far. Clearly, Schofield was not able to outflank the Confederates unless Thomas' army shifted to its right. Thomas reported that his army was already extended too much. Furthermore, Sherman received a report that McCook's cavalrymen were unable to damage the railroad line supplying Johnston's army because they were unable to cross the Chattahoochie River. A frustrated Sherman sent a telegram to Union Army Chief of Staff Major General Henry Halleck that, "The whole country is one vast fort ... As fast as we gain one position the enemy has another all ready".

Sherman faced three choices: use McPherson to hit Johnston's right flank, wear down the Confederates trenches by artillery barrages and short infantry advances, or make a frontal assault. Even though Blair reported that the trenches in front of him were held by cavalry, Sherman rejected the first choice. He was so fearful that Johnston might strike his vital railroad supply line near Big Shanty, that Sherman wanted McPherson to strongly guard that area. He also rejected the second choice. One of his strategic missions was to prevent Johnston from reinforcing General Robert E. Lee's army, so Sherman could not allow a stalemate to develop. Therefore, Sherman resolved to adopt the third choice: to make a frontal attack. He reasoned that he outnumbered Johnston, yet the Confederate trench lines were longer than his own. Therefore, they must be weak somewhere. This resulted in the Battle of Kennesaw Mountain on June 27 in which the Union attacks were repulsed with heavy casualties.

== Battlefield condition ==
Much of the battlefield landscape has been altered and fragmented. Some essential features remain, however, including the Kolb farm house and family cemetery, Ward Creek, and the heights used by the Federal XX and XXIII Corps in their repulse of the Confederate assault. These resources are protected within the Kennesaw Mountain National Battlefield Park. Residential subdivisions have hemmed in the park land and overwhelmed the battlefield landscape beyond the park boundary, including the heights from which the Confederates began their assault.

== Notes ==
Footnotes

Citations
