= Pine Mountain (Cobb County, Georgia) =

Mountain in Georgia, United States

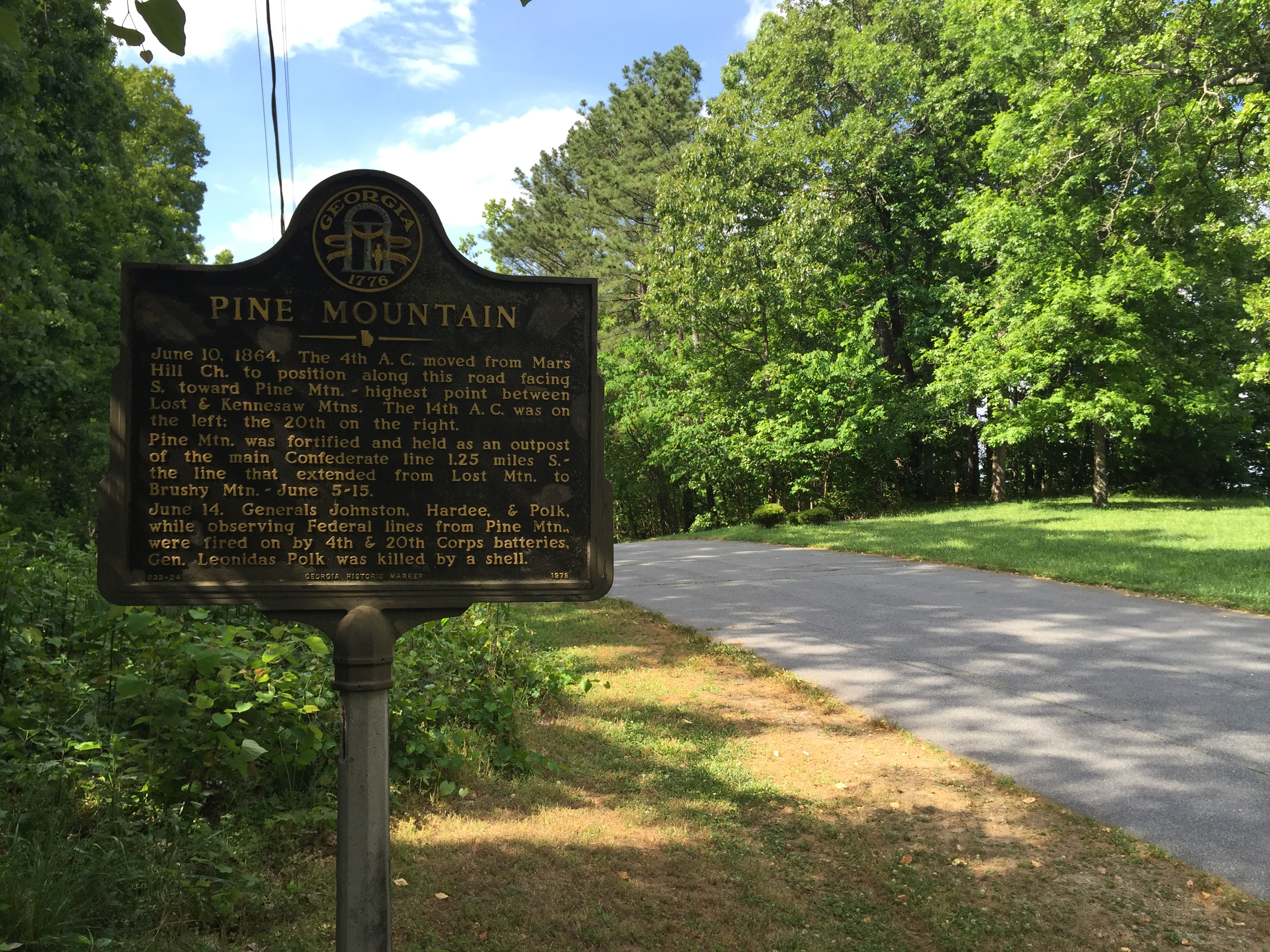
Historic marker on top of Pine Mountain

Pine Mountain is a natural geographical feature located in Cobb County, Georgia, near the town of Kennesaw.

== Geography ==
Pine Mountain is located at approximately 33°59'21.13" up North, 84°38'43.00" West. The small "mountain" has an approximate elevation of 1292 feet or 394 meters above sea level. Contrary to the implications of its name, Pine Mountain is plentiful with various deciduous trees. However, pines are usually the first tree to grow after deforestation, so it was likely covered with pines when it was named in the 19th century.

The mountain is also part of the ridge which divides the two watershed basins of the county. To the north and west is Lake Allatoona, while to the south and east is the Chattahoochee River. From here, the line runs west-southwest across Lost Mountain, and east-northeast across Kennesaw Mountain and Sweat Mountain.

== History ==
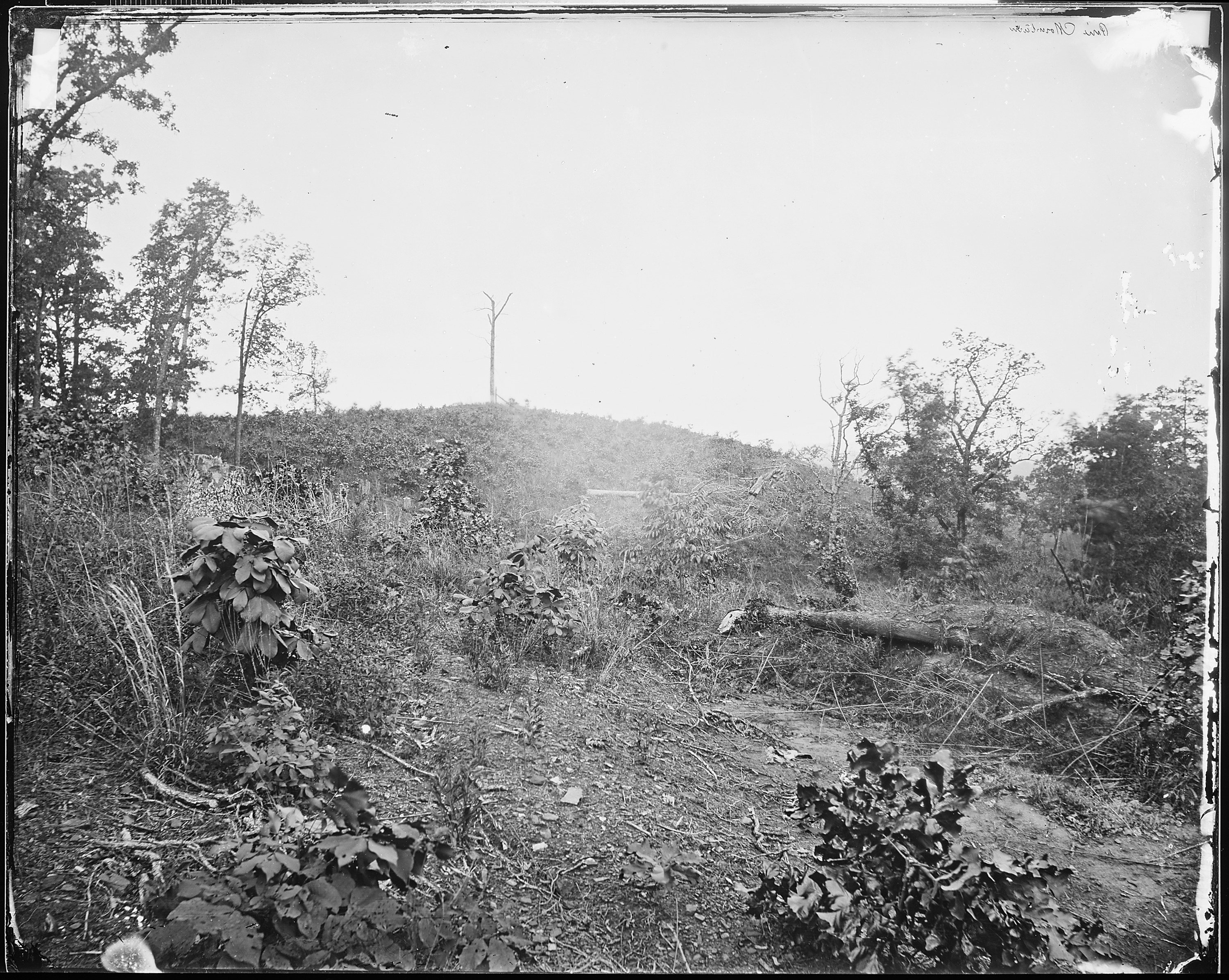
Pine Mountain in 1864.

Pine Mountain is the site where Confederate Lt. Gen. Leonidas Polk was killed on June 14, 1864, during the American Civil War. This occurred during a series of actions between June 10 and 19 that included the Battle of Gilgal Church.

Whereas Pine Mountain was the highest point between Kennesaw Mountain and Lost Mountain, it was of interest to both Confederate and Union forces during the Atlanta campaign. Consequently, between June 5 and June 15, Confederate forces fortified and held Pine Mountain as an outpost of the main Confederate line 1.2 miles south of the line that extended from Lost Mountain to Brushy Mountain. The Confederates positioned artillery of Bates' Division, Hardee's Corps Artillery, 5th Company of Washington Artillery of Louisiana, and Lt. R. T. Beauregard's South Carolina Battery atop Pine Mountain.

On June 10, the Union XIV and XX Corps Artilleries redeployed from Mars Hill Church to a position facing south towards Pine Mountain. The XIV Corps Artillery occupied the left flank; the XX the right. From this location, Union artillery hoped to check the Confederates' strategic placement of guns near Pine Mountain's summit.

On June 14, Generals Johnston, Hardee, and Polk, while positioned atop Pine Mountain to observe the Union lines, were fired upon by the Union batteries. General Polk was struck in his upper torso by an artillery shell, and died instantly. The observation outpost was abandoned the next day, as Confederate forces rejoined the main Confederate line. Near the summit of the mountain, a stone marker of considerable height, located here 33°59.337′N 84°38.759′W, was erected in memoriam to General Polk showing where he was standing when killed.
