= Allatoona, Georgia =

Flooded town in Bartow County, Georgia

Coordinates: 34.108154°N 84.711325°W

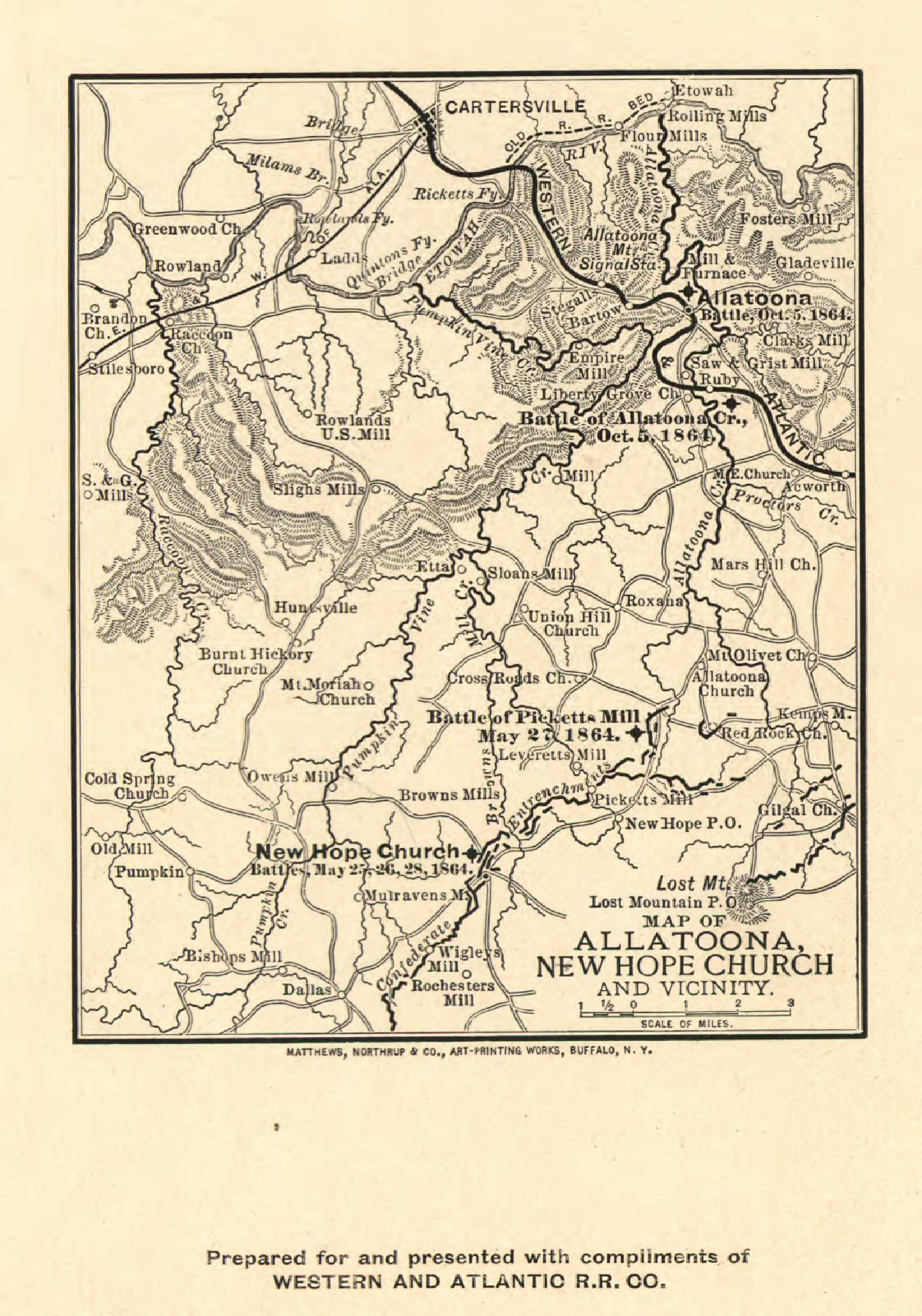
Map of Allatoona

Allatoona is an unincorporated community in Bartow County, in the U.S. state of Georgia. The community is located along Allatoona Creek, 6 miles (9.7 km) southeast of Cartersville. It was once a small mining community until a dam was erected at the base of the Etowah River, completely flooding the town of Allatoona. It is today perhaps best known as the site of the Battle of Allatoona.

== History ==
Allatoona was first founded in 1838. Allatoona was also considered both an agricultural community and transportation crossroads established along Allatoona Creek at the southern end of the Appalachian Mountains. One of the first official buildings was a small post office that was active until 1918. Before the Civil War, the town became increasingly popular, people started coming to the town in search of gold and other resources; a silver mine was also located nearby that also brought miners to the small town. The town also had a blacksmith, a small depot and a dry goods store. A small Universalist church was built in 1910 which also functioned as a schoolhouse. The town later expanded and added a new schoolhouse site which would be located just a half mile southeast of the railroad that ran through town. John Clayton was among the first settlers to the town of Allatoona. He was a rich slave owner and owned several plantations around the area. Several of the founders including John Clayton are buried in the cemetery adjacent to the church. The graves of founders and other residents can still be visited to this day.

== Battle of Allatoona ==
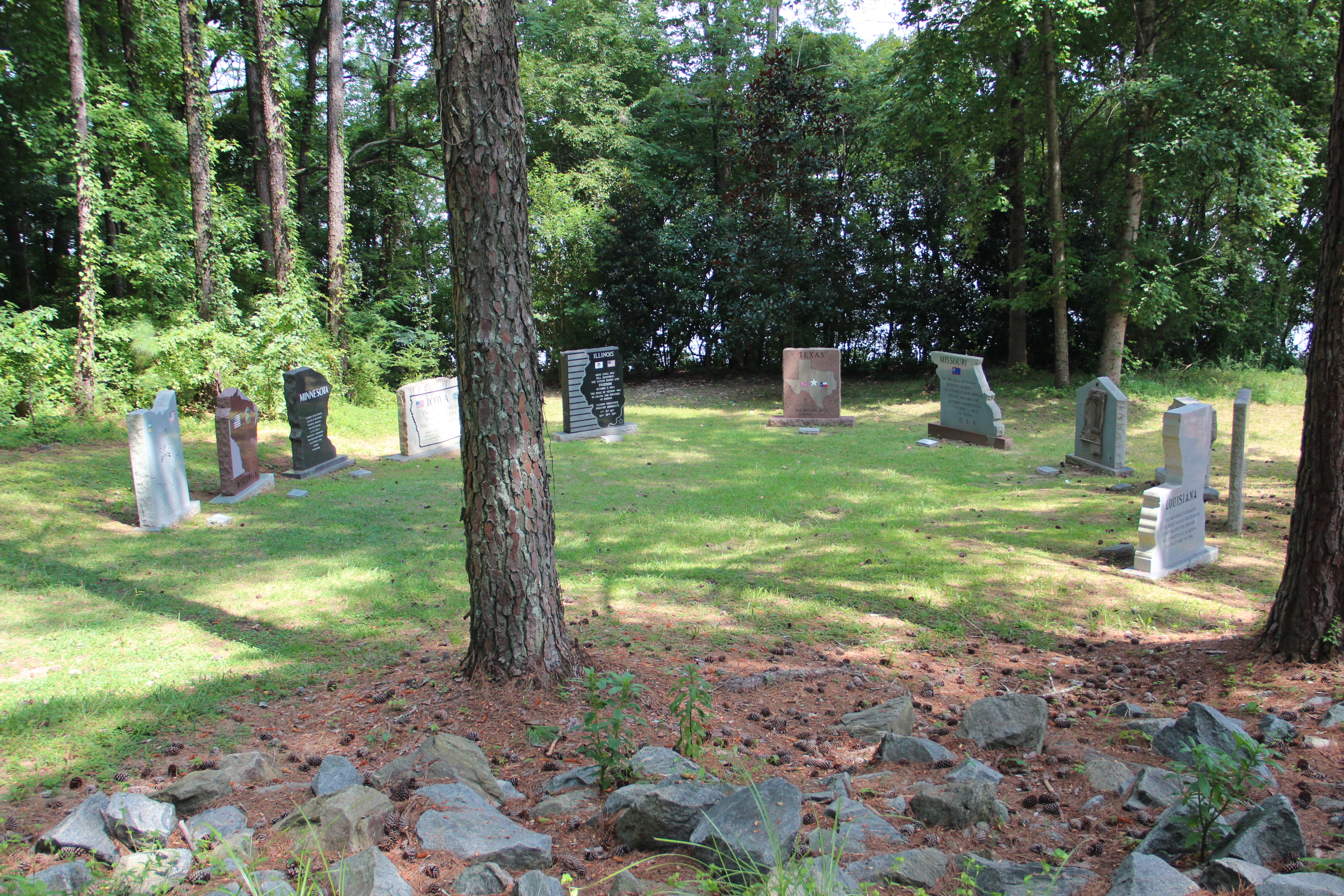
Memorial commemorating the Battle of Allatoona

After the Battle of Atlanta Southern Confederates wanted to stop General Sherman and his army of Northern troops. General Sherman aimed to finish his March to the Sea, conquering every town that his army encountered. The leader of the Confederate army, General Hood, and his soldiers were ordered to destroy the railroad that ran through the town of Allatoona. Doing so would weaken any chance of the Union army to finish taking control of other southern towns. On the morning of October 5, 1864, the Battle of Allatoona took place. As Confederate troops approached Allatoona pass they were outnumbered, by 1%, by Union troops, 2,000 to 1,944. Confederate soldiers, in an attempt to fight off the larger number of Union troops, resorted to rocks and hand-to-hand combat to secure the town of Allatoona for the south. John Clayton's plantation home, known as the Clayton-Mooney house, was used as a Union headquarters as well as a makeshift hospital during the battle. During the battle, the Confederate Army had received a tip that the Union reinforcements were on the way. General Hood made the decision to pull his troops from battle, and thus ended up defeated. The Confederate army lost to the Union because of false information they had received. It is known as one of the Civil War's bloodiest battles.

The Clayton-Mooney home, c. 1836, is the only structure still standing. Bloodstains and bullet holes are still able to be seen today and serve as a reminder of the events that took place in Allatoona.

== Allatoona Dam ==
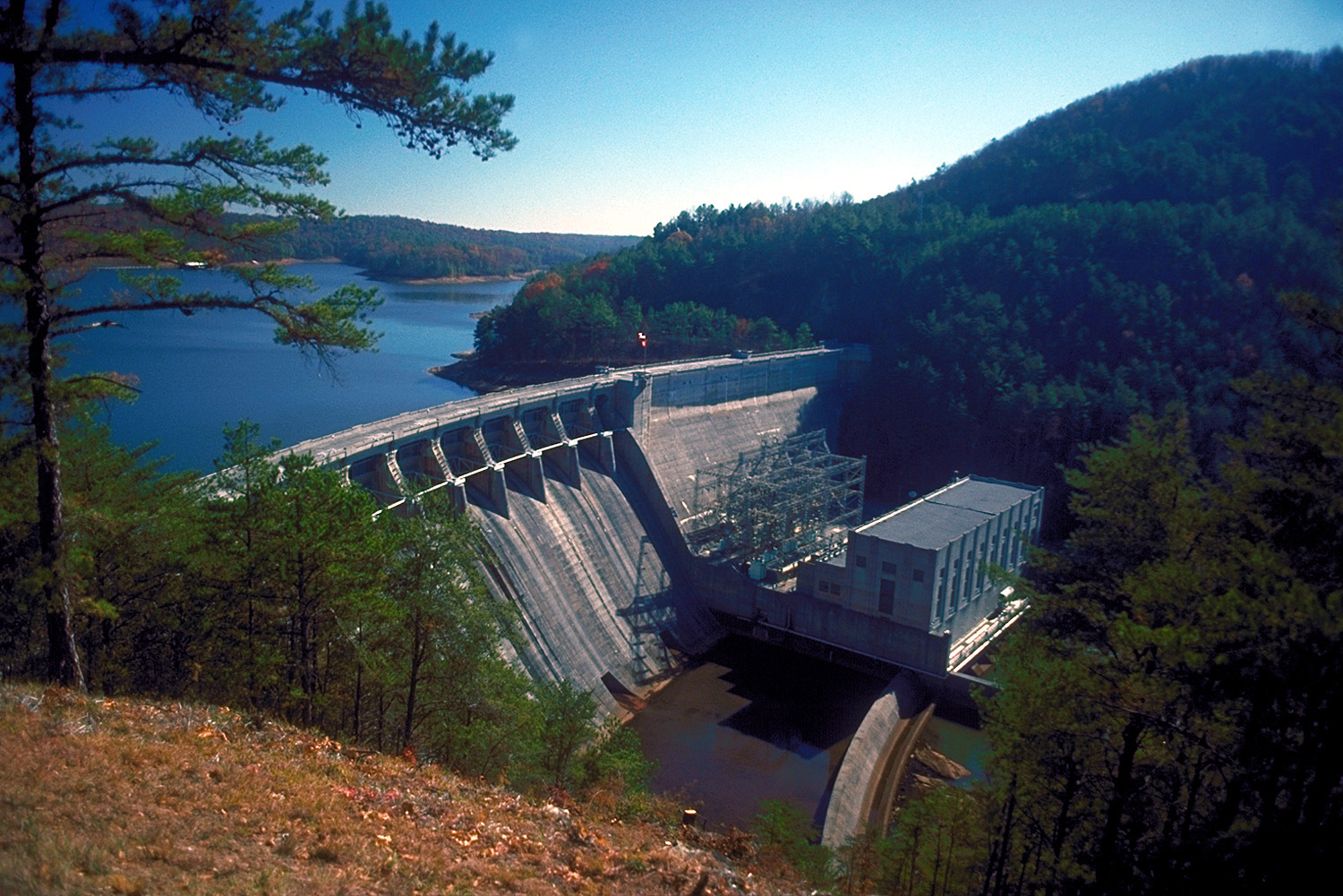
Allatoona Dam from the air

Allatoona Dam is located at the base of the Etowah River and approximately a mile off of Interstate 75. It is roughly 30 miles from downtown Atlanta, Georgia. The first official recognition that the present dam site on the Etowah River near Cartersville, Georgia, was a prime location for a hydropower project was in a document entitled, "Reports on Examination and Survey of Etowah, Coosa, Tallapoosa and Alabama Rivers", prepared in 1910 by the U. S. Army Corps of Engineers. Lake Allatoona was authorized by the Flood Control Acts of 1941 and 1946 The town of Allatoona was scheduled to be destroyed to allow for the construction of the dam. The construction of the dam took place prior to World War II. When the US joined WWII construction on the dam had to be put on hold. Once the war ended work on the dam was restarted on February 8, 1946; instead of the Army Corps finishing the project they opted for hired laborers to complete the dam. Lake Allatoona began to fill just after Christmas in 1949. By May 1950, the lake was full, with 12,010 acres of water and 270 miles of shoreline. The power plant began operation on January 31, 1950. The dam serves several functions, including seven authorized purposes such as: flood control, hydropower generation, water supply, recreation, fish and wildlife management, water quality, and Navigation. Before the dam was built the town of Allatoona and other surrounding areas would occasionally flood causing extensive damage throughout the town. The addition of Allatoona Dam has prevented nearly $80 million in flood damages since 1950. The total cost of the Allatoona Dam project for construction, land, and relocation was $31,500,000 in 1950. That's roughly $300 million in 2013 dollars. The Allatoona dam is approximately 1,250 feet in length and the maximum height above the existing riverbed is 190 feet. An 18-foot wide roadway is provided across the entire length of the dam.

== Recreation ==
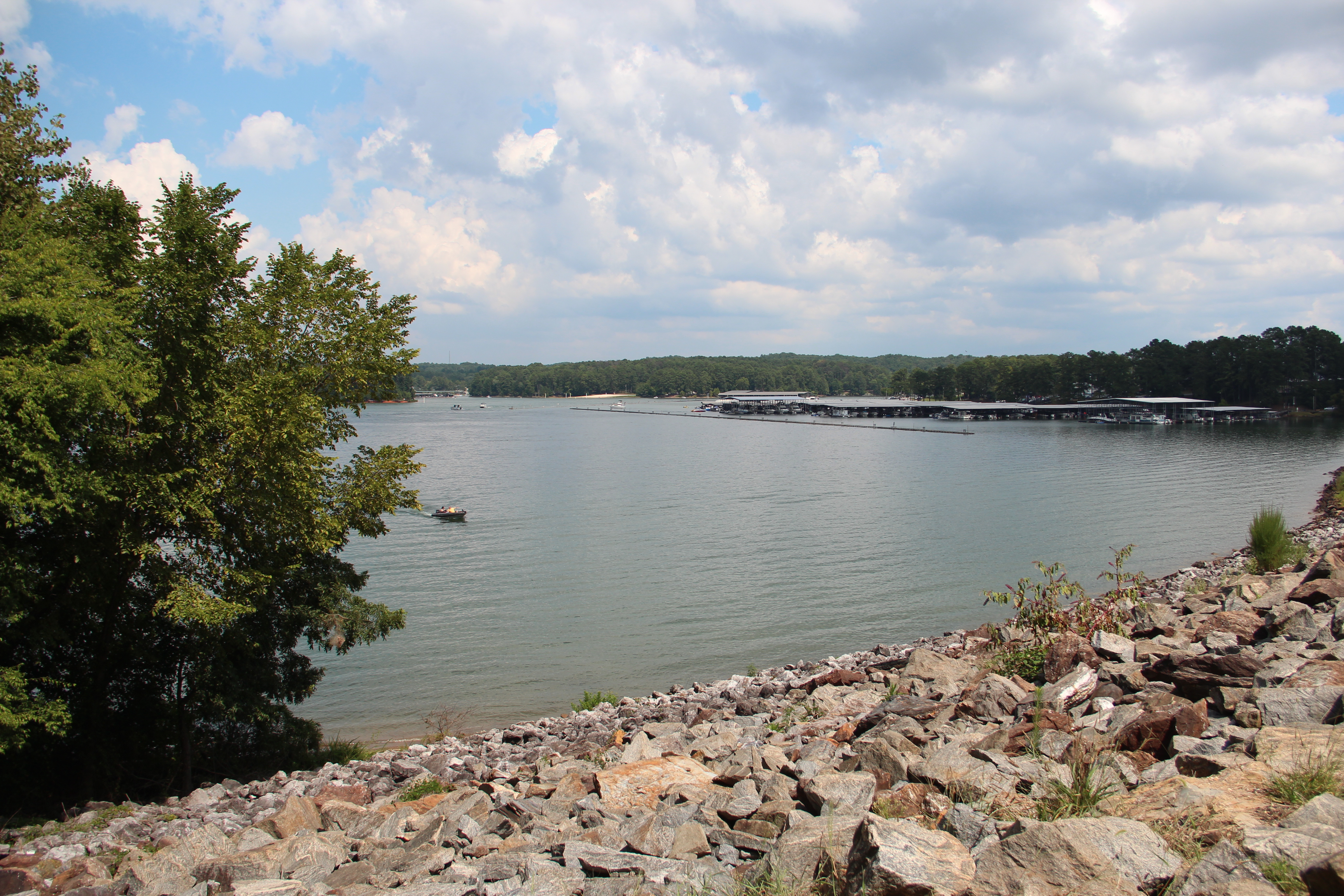
Lake Allatoona seen from Allatoona

With the installation of the dam and the town of Allatoona now transformed into a lake, the surrounding areas were converted for recreational use. Several beaches, campgrounds, and cabins are scattered throughout the area. Around the shores of Allatoona there are 25 parks, 8 marinas and 10 campgrounds. There are several parks used for daily use on Lake Allatoona and the Etowah River. The surrounding land is ideal for families and sees large surges of guests every year. Out of the dozens of parks at Allatoona two of those are handicap accessible so that all patrons can still take part in lake activities. In 1998, Lake Allatoona clocked more visitor hours than any of the other 450 Corps of Engineers projects in the United States. In the 1980s during a drought that affected Bartow County and other regions, the water level of the lake reached an all-time low due to the dry conditions. During the peak of the drought, onlookers were able to see the old roads, remnants of houses and tree stumps clearly visible from above water. Presently the park is managed and maintained by Red Top Mountain State Park.
