= Kennesaw Mountain (disambiguation) =

Kennesaw Mountain is a high-running ridge between Marietta and Kennesaw, Georgia in the United States.

Kennesaw Mountain may also refer to:

- Little Kennesaw Mountain, a sub-peak of Kennesaw Mountain in Georgia
- Battle of Kennesaw Mountain an 1864 American Civil War battle
- Kennesaw Mountain National Battlefield Park, a park that preserves the Kennesaw Mountain Battlefield
- Kenesaw Mountain Landis (1866–1944), American federal judge and Commissioner of Baseball
- Kennesaw Mountain High School, located in Cobb County, Georgia

== See also ==
- Kennesaw, Georgia
