= Janda (surname) =

Janda (feminine: Jandová) is a Czech surname, derived from the personal name Jan. Notable people with the surname include:

- Anton Janda (1904–1986), Austrian footballer
- Antonín Janda (1892–1960), Czech footballer
- Elisabeth Janda (unknown–1780), Czech musician
- Eliška Jandová (born 1974), Czech rower
- František Janda (1886–1956), Czech architect and urban planner
- František Janda (wrestler) (1910–1986), Czech wrestler
- František Janda-Suk (1878–1955), Czech athlete
- Jakub Janda (born 1978), Czech ski jumper
- Jaroslav Janda (born 1942), Czech alpine skier
- Kim Janda (born 1957), American chemist
- Krystyna Janda (born 1952), Polish actress
- Ludmila Jandová (1938–2008), Czech painter and printmaker
- Ludwig Janda (1919–1981), German footballer
- Marta Jandová (born 1974), Czech musician and actress
- Pavel Janda (born 1976), Czech canoer
- Petr Janda (architect) (born 1975), Czech architect
- Petr Janda (footballer) (born 1987), Czech footballer
- Petr Janda (musician) (born 1942), Czech musician
- Tomáš Janda (born 1973), Czech footballer
- Zora Jandová (born 1958), Czech actress and radio presenter
- Zuzana Jandová (born 1987), Czech beauty pageant contestant
