= Janda =

Janda may refer to:

- Janda, Afghanistan, a village
- Janda (surname), Czech surname
