= Mario Korbel =

American sculptor

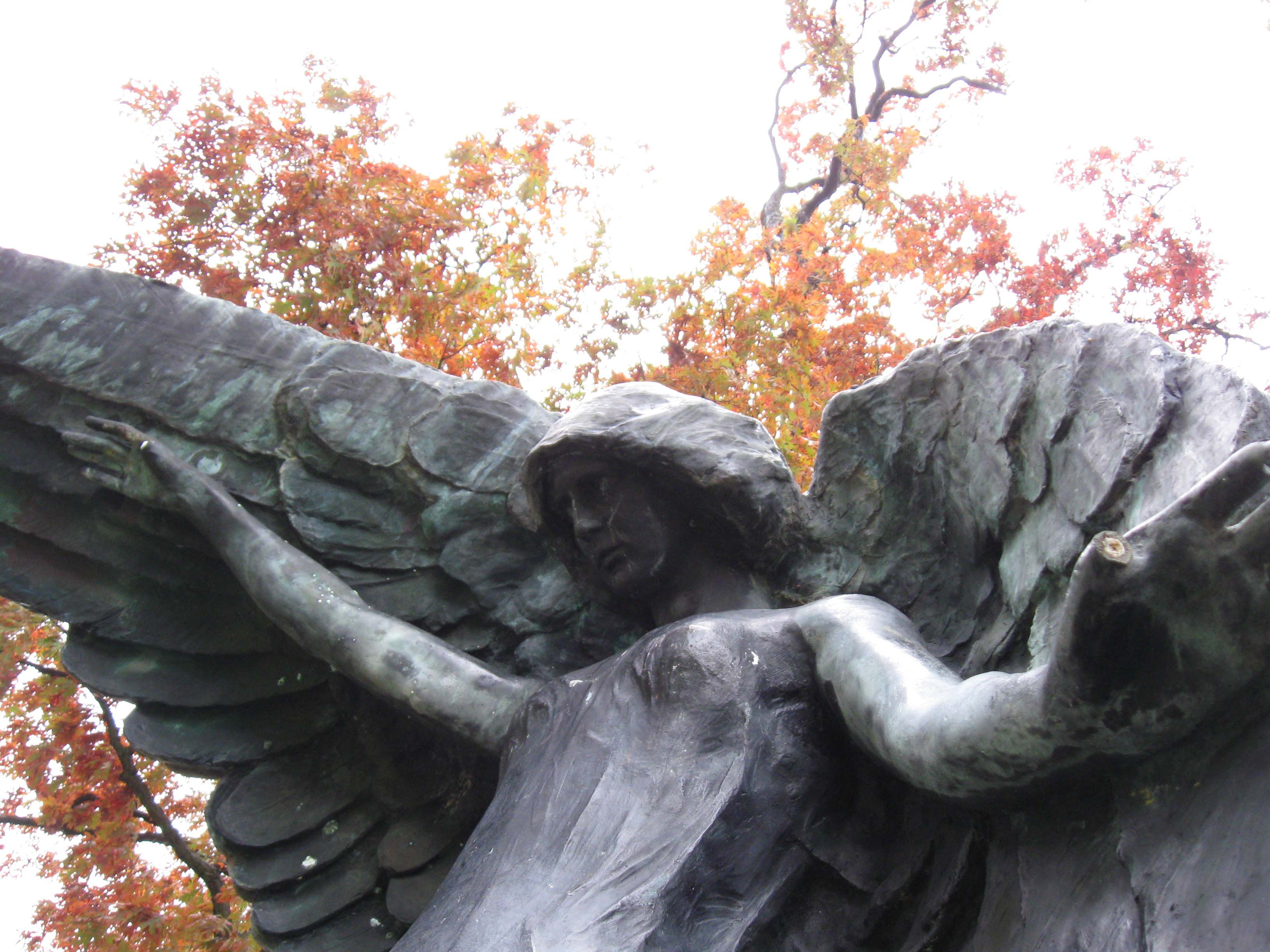
Korbel's Black Angel, 1913, Oakland Cemetery, Iowa City

Mario Joseph Korbel (March 22, 1882 – March 31, 1954) was a Czech-American sculptor.

== Biography ==
He was born in Osík, Bohemia (now Czech Republic) on March 22, 1882, to a clergyman, Joseph Korbel and his wife Katherina Dolezal Korbel. He began studying sculpture in his homeland, continuing his studies after moving to the United States at age 18. He returned to Europe and continued his studies in Berlin, Munich and Paris.

He was one of a dozen sculptors invited to compete in the Pioneer Woman statue competition in 1927, which he failed to win. Korbel's submission by name of "Heroic" is on display as part of Phillips' collection at Woolaroc

Korbel was a member of the National Sculpture Society. He was elected into the National Academy of Design in 1937 as an Associate member and became a full Academician in 1944.

He died on March 31, 1954, in Manhattan, New York City.

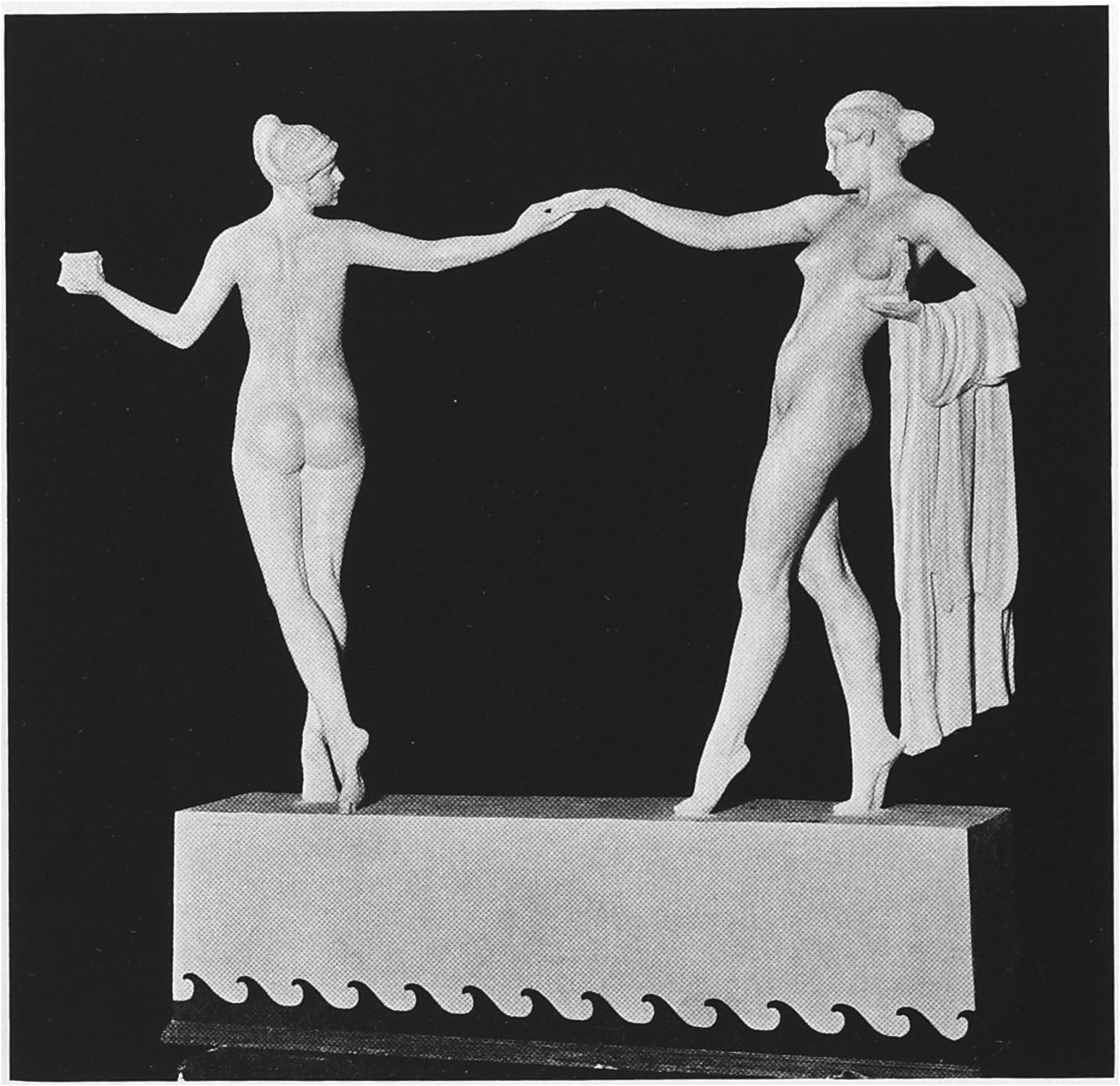
Architecture and Sculpture, allegorical bronze miniature, 1916

== Works ==
His sculpture can be found at below sites, as well as at several sites in the Czech Republic.

- Brookgreen Gardens, Murrells Inlet, South Carolina
- Art Institute of Chicago
- Lyman Allyn Museum, New London, Connecticut
- Museum of Fine Arts of St Petersburg, St Petersburg, Florida
- Honolulu Academy of Fine Arts, Honolulu, Hawaii
- Fogg Museum. Harvard University. Cambridge, Massachusetts
- Caramoor Rosen House, Katonah, New York
- Cranbrook Educational Community, Bloomfield Hills, Michigan
- Cleveland Museum of Art, Cleveland, Ohio
- Metropolitan Museum of Art, New York City
- National Gallery of Canada, Ottawa, Canada
- Illinois Monument, Kennesaw Mountain National Battlefield Park, Marietta, Georgia
- Racine Heritage Museum, Racine, Wisconsin
- "Oakland Cemetery, Iowa City, Iowa
- Newark Museum, Newark, New Jersey
- McPhee Memorial, Denver, Colorado
- Ezekiel W. Cullen Building, University of Texas, Austin, Texas
- Alma Mater statue, Universidad de La Habana, Havana, Cuba (1919)
- Bohemian National Cemetery, Chicago, Illinois

As a medalist Korbel designed a medal struck by the Medallic Art Company New York about Nazi Germany occupying Bohemia and Moravia. That medal was available at the unfinished pavilion of Czechoslovakia of the 1939 New York World's Fair as an award for contributions to the Czech Resistance.
