= Jandy =

Jandy is a given name. Notable people with the name include:

- Jandy Feliz (a.k.a. José del Carmen Feliz Matos, born 1977), Dominican singer-songwriter
- Jandy Nelson (born 1965), American young-adult author

== See also ==
- Janda (surname)
