= Little Kennesaw Mountain =

Mountain in Georgia, United States

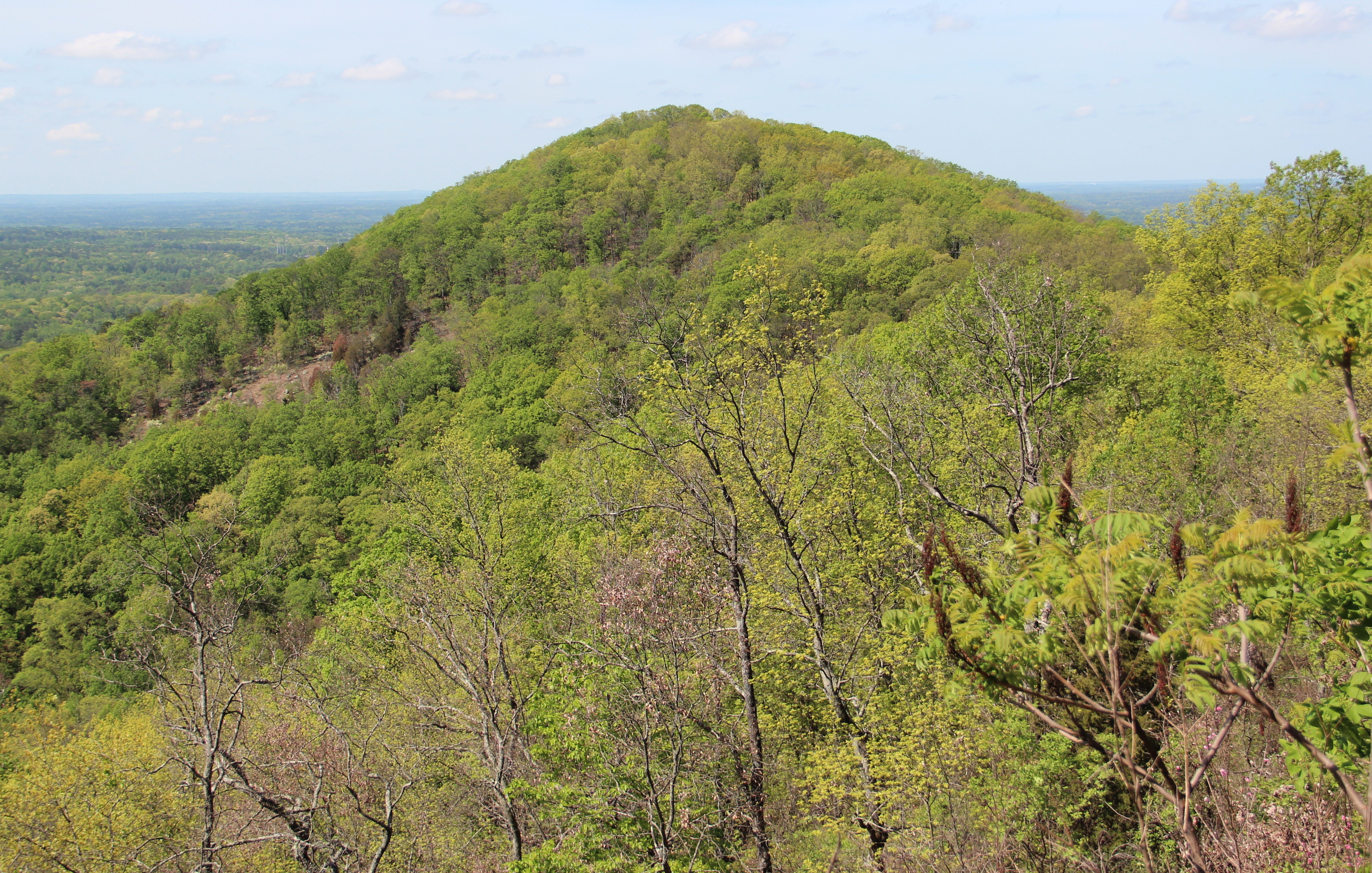
- Little Kennesaw Mountain, viewed from Kennesaw Mountain

Highest point
- Elevation: 1,610 ft (490 m) NAVD 88
- Prominence: 140 ft (43 m)
- Parent peak: Kennesaw Mountain
- Coordinates: 33°58′14″N 84°35′13″W

Geography
- Location within Georgia
- Location: Cobb County, Georgia
- Parent range: Appalachian Ridges
- Topo map: USGS Marietta

Climbing
- Easiest route: Trail hike

Little Kennesaw Mountain is a mountain in Cobb County, Georgia, northwest of Marietta and south of Kennesaw. It is a sub-peak of Kennesaw Mountain, the site of the Battle of Kennesaw Mountain in the 1864 Atlanta campaign of the American Civil War.

The defensive-minded Confederate general Joseph E. Johnston constructed a series of trenches from Kennesaw Mountain to Kolb Farm to prevent or delay Union general William T. Sherman's approach towards Atlanta, Georgia. For the purpose of defending the Confederate line, the Confederates constructed Fort McBride here, but Little Kennesaw Mountain experienced only skirmishes, with most of the fighting occurring to the south. Now a part of Kennesaw Mountain National Battlefield Park, the mountain is part of a popular trail that strings from Burnt Hickory Road to the park visitor center, traversing Pigeon Hill and both mountains.
