= YoungSoo Kim =

South Korean chemist (born 1978)

- 김영수
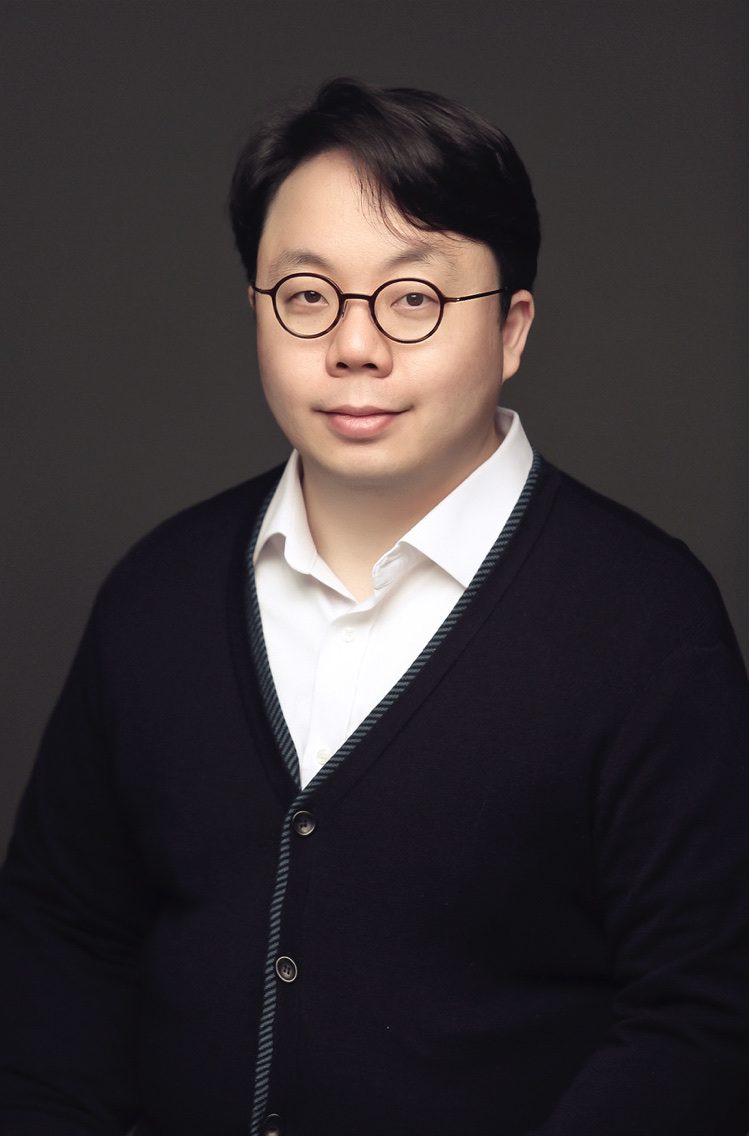
- Born: April 7, 1978 (age 48); Seoul, South Korea
- Education: New York University, Scripps Research
- Scientific career
- Fields: Chemical Biology
- Doctoral advisor: Kim D. Janda
- Website: http://chembio.yonsei.ac.kr

YoungSoo Kim (Korean: 김영수; born April 7, 1978) is a South Korean chemist. Kim is an tenured professor in Department of Pharmacy at Yonsei University.

== Education ==
Kim completed his B.A. degree in biochemistry from New York University in 2001, with Professor Young-Tae Chang as an undergraduate research advisor. He then studied bioorganic chemistry under the supervision of Professor Kim D. Janda at Scripps Research and obtained his Ph.D. degree in chemistry in 2006.

== Academic career ==
In 2006, Kim joined Korea Institute of Science and Technology (KIST) as a research scientist. In 2010, after his military service duty, he became a principal investigator of Brain Science Institute at KIST and associate professor of biological chemistry at Korea University of Science and Technology (UST). In 2017, he moved to Yonsei University as an assistant professor of bio-convergence (ISED) and pharmacy. In 2020, he was promoted to an associate professor of pharmacy.

In addition to Department of Pharmacy, Kim is affiliated in three other departments of Yonsei; Integrated Science and Engineering Division (ISED), of Underwood International College (UIC), Graduate Program of Integrative Biotechnology and Translational Medicine (IBTM), and Graduate Program of Industrial Pharmaceutical Sciences. Kim is an adjunct professor of POSTECH.

== Editorial career ==
Kim is an editorial board member (neurology section) of Scientific Reports, academic editor of PLOS ONE, executive editor of Experimental Neurobiology.

== Research ==
His laboratory is located at Yonsei University International Campus in Songdo International Business District. Kim's work focuses on pathology, therapeutics, and diagnostics of Alzheimer's disease by using Chemical Biology as a research tool. A significant effort of the Kim laboratory in recent years has been to identify small molecules that control protein misfolding and cognitive impairments of Alzheimer's disease. Such research achievements in taurine derivatives reversing Alzheimer pathology and Alzheimer blood tests detecting plasma amyloid-beta contributed to rank Korea Institute of Science and Technology #6 among The World's Most Innovative Research Institutions, selected by Reuters, in 2016 and 2017. His recent review article about fluid biomarkers of Alzheimer's disease published in Experimental & Molecular Medicine was selected in Springer Nature 2019 Highlights. Examples of such molecules discovered include:

- EPPS, a small molecule disaggregating amyloid-beta oligomers and plaques
- Taurine, a food supplement recovering learning and memory
- Necrostatin-1, an anti-necroptotic molecule regulating both amyloid-beta misfolding and tau hyperphosphorylation
- CLASS (Comparing Levels of Aβ by Self-Standard), a blood test method to diagnose Alzheimer's disease
- Drug repositioning for chemical-driven clearance of amyloid plaques
- Chemical-driven outflow of dissociated amyloid burden from brain to blood
