= Cheatham Hill =

Summit in Cobb County, Georgia, United States

Coordinates: 33°56′10″N 84°35′50″W

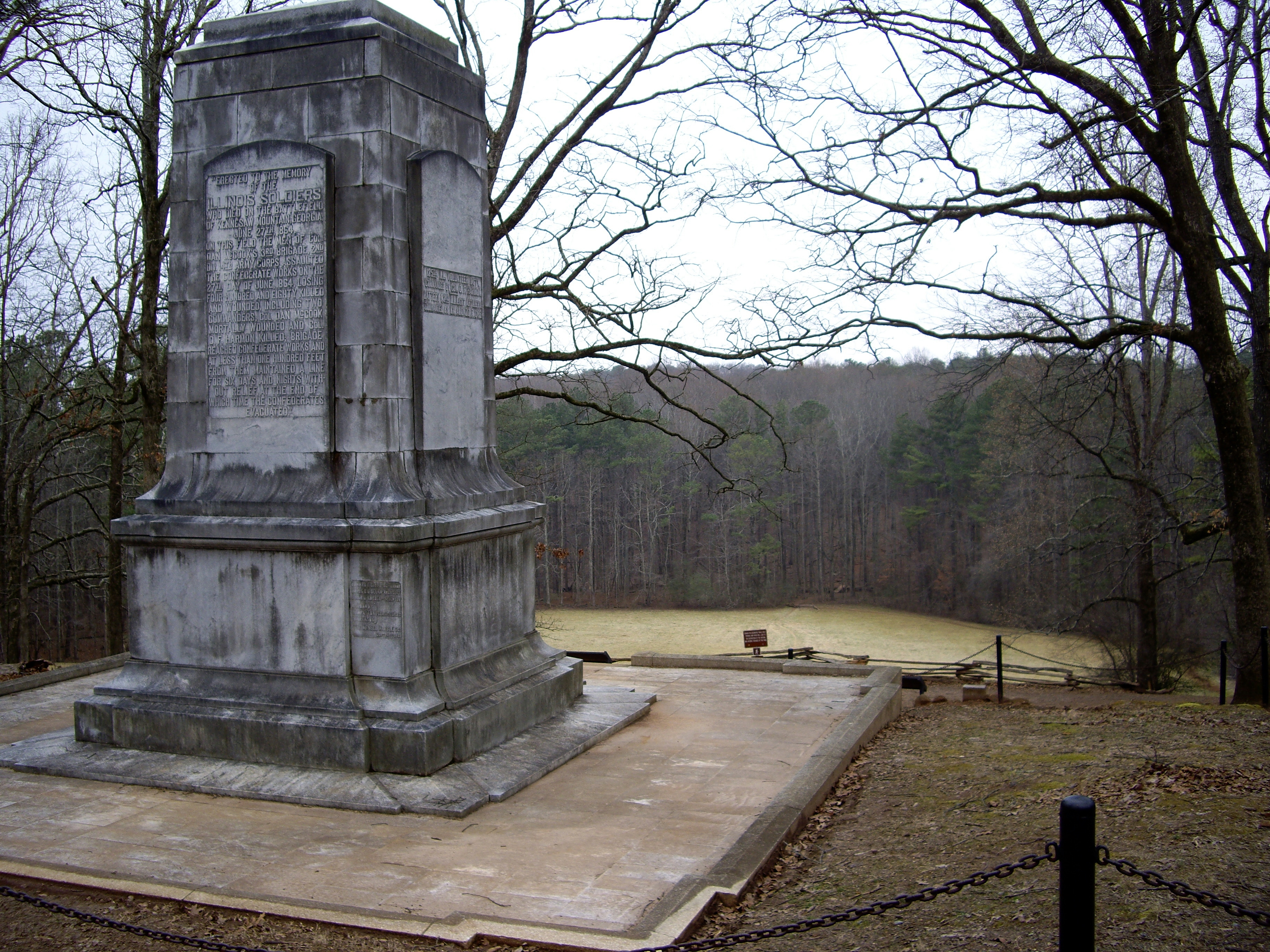
Illinois Monument on Cheatham Hill

Cheatham Hill is a summit in the U.S. state of Georgia. The elevation is 1,122 feet (342 m).

Cheatham Hill was named after Benjamin F. Cheatham, a general in the Confederate States Army during the American Civil War. The hill was the scene of heavy fighting during the Battle of Kennesaw Mountain. The site is home to the Illinois Monument, which honors Union soldiers from Illinois.
