= Osík =

- Municipality
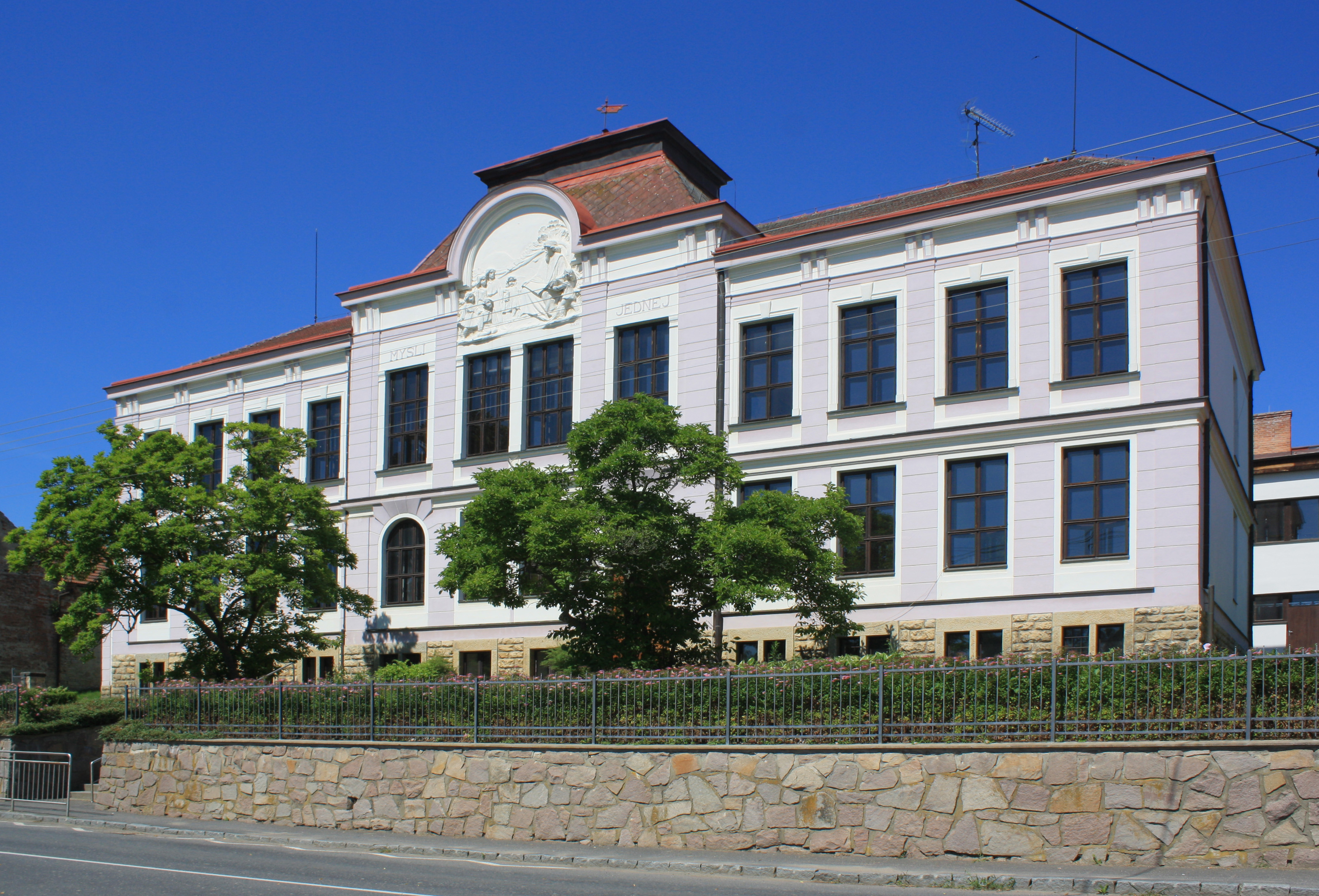
- Primary school

- Flag Coat of arms

- Location in the Czech Republic
- Coordinates: 49°50′37″N 16°17′5″E
- Country: Czech Republic
- Region: Pardubice
- District: Svitavy
- First mentioned: 1347

Area
  - Total: 12.61 km^{2} (4.87 sq mi)
- Elevation: 355 m (1,165 ft)

Population (2026-01-01)
  - Total: 1,060
  - Density: 84.1/km^{2} (218/sq mi)
- Time zone: UTC+1 (CET)
  - Summer (DST): UTC+2 (CEST)
- Postal code: 569 67
- Website: www.osik.cz

Osík is a municipality and village in Svitavy District in the Pardubice Region of the Czech Republic. It has about 1,100 inhabitants.

Osík lies approximately 17 kilometres (11 mi) north-west of Svitavy, 42 km (26 mi) south-east of Pardubice, and 136 km (85 mi) east of Prague.

== Demographics ==
Historical population
Year	Pop.	±%
1869	1,289	—
1880	1,264	−1.9%
1890	1,267	+0.2%
1900	1,179	−6.9%
1910	1,244	+5.5%
1921	1,301	+4.6%
1930	1,243	−4.5%
1950	976	−21.5%
1961	1,013	+3.8%
1970	955	−5.7%
1980	912	−4.5%
1991	936	+2.6%
2001	983	+5.0%
2011	1,011	+2.8%
2021	954	−5.6%
Source: Censuses

== Notable people ==
- Mario Korbel (1882–1954), Czech-American sculptor
- Ludmila Jandová (1938–2008), painter
