= Illinois Monument =

Public monument in Kennesaw Mountain National Battlefield Park, Georgia

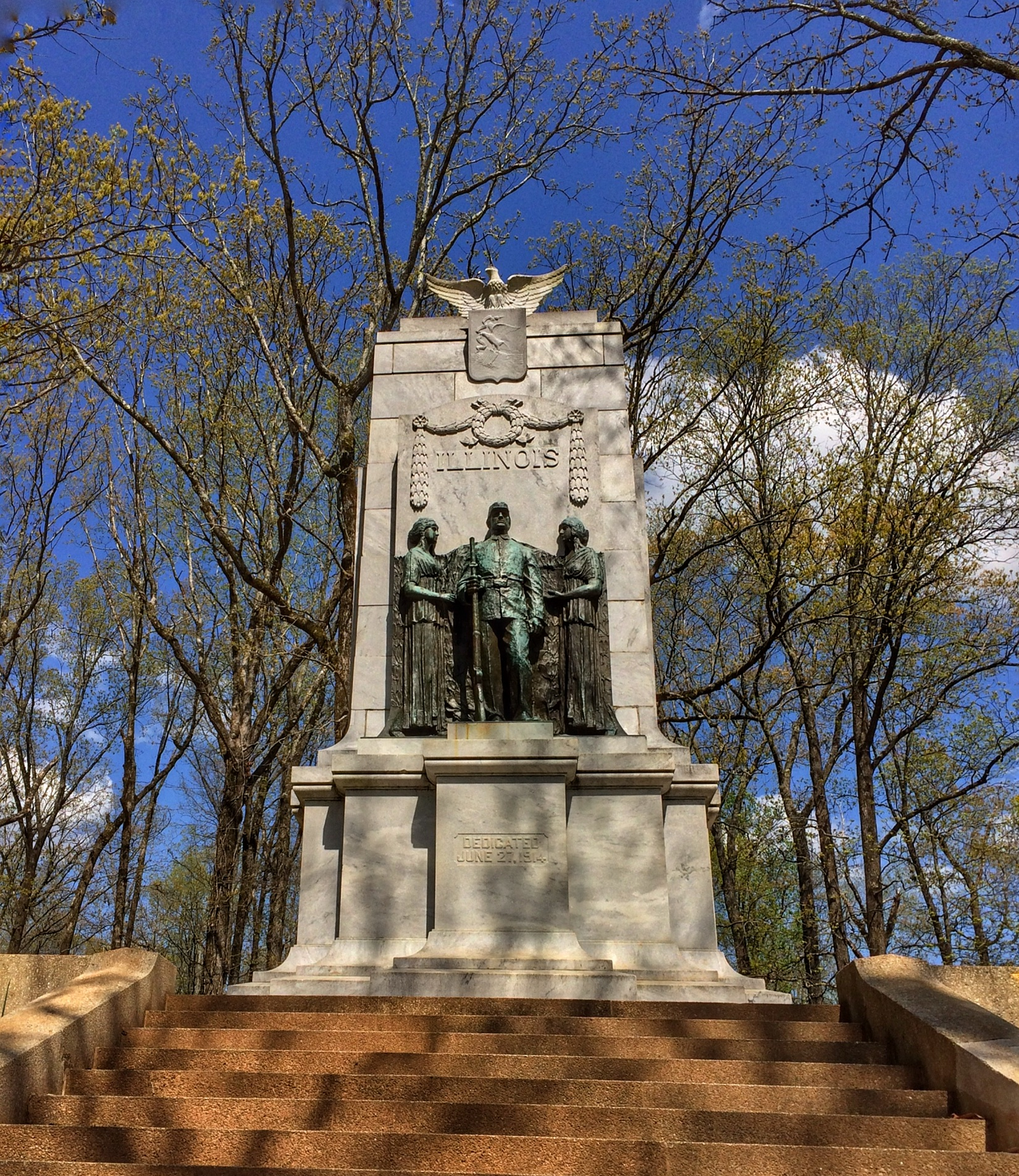
- The monument in 2018
- Location: Kennesaw Mountain National Battlefield Park, Cobb County, Georgia, United States
- Coordinates: 33°56′04.4″N 84°35′54.3″W
- Designer: James Dibelka (architect); Mario Korbel (sculptor)
- Builder: McNeel Marble Works
- Material: Bronze; Georgia marble
- Length: 19 feet (5.8 m)
- Width: 19 feet (5.8 m)
- Height: 25 feet (7.6 m)
- Dedicated date: June 27, 1914
- Dedicated to: Soldiers from Illinois who fought in the Battle of Kennesaw Mountain

The Illinois Monument is a public monument located in the Kennesaw Mountain National Battlefield Park in Cobb County, Georgia, United States. The monument honors the soldiers from Illinois who fought in the Battle of Kennesaw Mountain during the Atlanta campaign of the American Civil War. It is located on Cheatham Hill, the site of intense fighting during the battle, and was dedicated in 1914, on the 50th anniversary of the battle. It was designed by Mario Korbel and James Dibelka.

== History ==
=== Background ===
On June 27, 1864, the Battle of Kennesaw Mountain took place in north Georgia as part of the Atlanta campaign of the American Civil War. That day, Lansing Dawdy, a Mason and adjutant in the 86th Illinois Infantry Regiment, was shot and severely wounded during a charge on the Dead Angle (Cheatham Hill). He was rescued by a Confederate States Army soldier and fellow Mason who recognized a Masonic hand signal Dawdy did. He ultimately survived the war and would return to the site of the battle numerous times after the war's end. By 1899, 65 acres (26 hectares) of land encompassing all of Cheatham's Hill was owned by a person named Channell, and it was a popular tourist attraction. At the time, there was a growing push for historic preservation of the area, especially among veterans of Daniel McCook Jr.'s brigade, which had participated in the battle. That year, Dawdy visited the site with his family, and while there, his daughter convinced him to buy the property from Channell. While initially only intending to buy about 20 acres (8.1 hectares), he ultimately bought approximately 60 acres (24 hectares) of land from Channell on December 26, 1899. He paid $1,000 for the property. On February 15, 1900, he transferred the property over to Martin Kingman and John McGinnis.

By August 1901, the Kennesaw Monumental Association was formed in Illinois. According to that month's issue of Stone magazine, "sixty acres of ground [had] been secured" by the association, which intended to erect memorials on the site, including those honoring Union Army troops from Illinois, Indiana, and Ohio. The association was also known as the Kennesaw Memorial Association, and after 1907 it would be renamed the Kennesaw Mountain Battlefield Association. According to historian Earl J. Hess, the Kennesaw Memorial Association started off as an adjunct group of the Colonel Dan McCook Brigade Association, with the goal of administering and maintaining the site. The brigade association promoted the erection of markers and held a dedication ceremony on Cheatham Hill on September 22, 1902. On August 13, 1904, the property was transferred to the brigade association.

The memorial association began to fundraise for the erection of a monument in honor of the fallen Union Army soldiers. However, the money raised was insufficient, and in 1907, they petitioned the government of Illinois for funding, without success. However, several years later, the government approved funding, allocating $20,000 to the monument's construction. However, total costs for the project would be $25,000, which included the erection of nearby historical markers and a stone arch. Additionally, the governor of Illinois appointed a commission to oversee the project. James Dibelka was chosen as the project's architect, while Mario Korbel served as the sculptor. The McNeel Marble Works of Marietta, Georgia, erected the monument.

=== Dedication and later history ===
The monument was unveiled on June 27, 1914, on the 50th anniversary of the battle. The monument was officially unveiled by Sara Sadely, the granddaughter of W. A. Payton, who had been the supervising architect for the monument. Illinois Governor Edward Fitzsimmons Dunne and Georgia Governor John M. Slaton, accompanied by members of the Illinois General Assembly and Georgia General Assembly, took part in the ceremonies, with both giving speeches that emphasized post-Civil War reconciliation. A picnic dinner was held by the Marietta chapters of both the United Daughters of the Confederacy and the Daughters of the American Revolution. Many veterans attended the ceremony, and bullets that had been collected from the battlefield were spread over the area, so that the veterans could take them home as a souvenir.

According to author Sean P. Graham, the monument and surrounding 60 acres (24 hectares) would go on to form the basis for the Kennesaw Mountain National Battlefield Park, with the property coming under the ownership of the U.S. government in 1926. From late 2013 to early 2014, the monument underwent a restoration, and it was rededicated on June 27, 2014, the 150th anniversary of the battle.

== Design ==
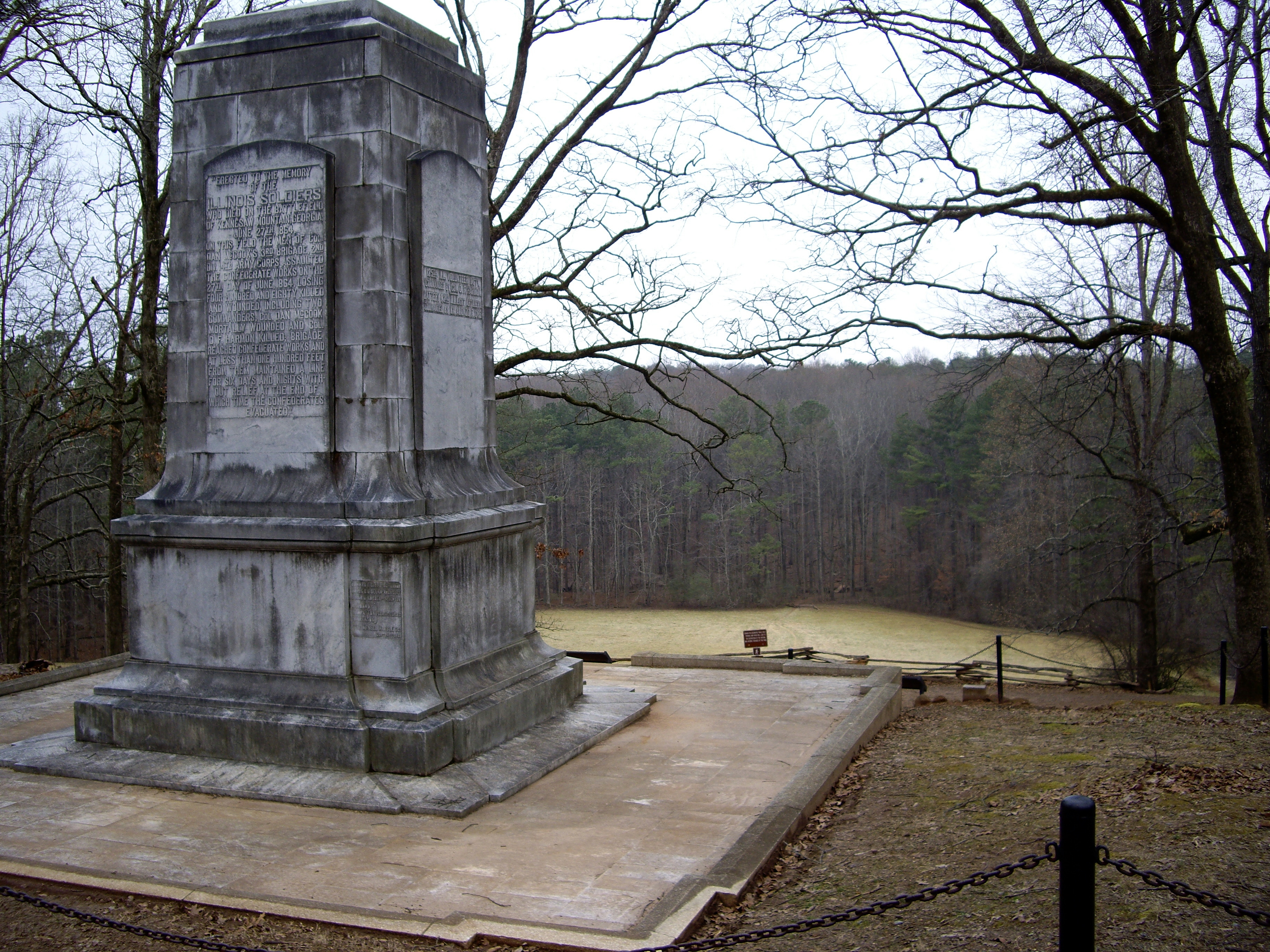
The monument's rear and surrounding area

The monument is made of Georgia marble and is 25 feet (7.6 m) tall. (Note: One source gives the height as 26 feet (7.9 m). The height given here is the one stated by the National Park Service.) The base has a width of 19 feet (5.8 m). Attached to the front of the monument is a bronze statue measuring 7 feet (2.1 m) in height. (Note: "[L]ife-size", according to the National Park Service.) The statue depicts a Union soldier at parade rest with two Greek figures on either side of him representing "peace" and either "victory" or the state of Illinois. A bald eagle sits atop the monument. The monument bears the following inscriptions:

ILLINOIS / DEDICATED / JUNE 27, 1914

— Front

"ERECTED TO THE MEMORY / OF THE / ILLINOIS SOLDIERS / WHO DIED ON THE BATTLEFIELD / OF KENNESAW MOUNTAIN, GEORGIA, / JUNE 27TH, 1864. / ON THIS FIELD THE MEN OF COL. / DAN MCCOOK'S 3RD BRIGADE, 2ND / DIV. 14TH ARMY CORPS ASSAULTED / THE CONFEDERATE WORKS ON THE / 27TH DAY OF JUNE, 1864, LOSING / FOUR HUNDRED AND EIGHTY KILLED / AND WOUNDED, INCLUDING TWO / COMMANDERS, COL. DAN MCCOOK / MORTALLY WOUNDED AND COL. / O. F. HARMON KILLED; BRIGADE / REACHED CONFEDERATE WORKS AND / AT LESS THAN ONE HUNDRED FEET / FROM THEM MAINTAINED A LINE / FOR SIX DAYS AND NIGHTS WITH- / OUT RELIEF, AT THE END OF / WHICH TIME THE CONFEDERATES / EVACUATED"

— Rear

125TH ILL. VOLUNTEER INFTY. / COMMANDED BY COL. O. F. HARMON. / BATTERY I, 2ND ILL. LIGHT ARTILLERY. / COMMANDED BY LT. ALONZO F. COE.

— Left

85TH ILL. VOLUNTEER INFTY. / COMMANDED BY COL. C. J. DILWORTH. / 86TH ILL. VOLUNTEER INFTY. / COMMANDED BY LT. COL. A. L. FAHNESTOCK.

— Right

Additionally, an inscription in the bottom corner on the rear of the monument bears the name of the Illinois governor, architect, sculptor, commissioners, and contractors for the project.

== See also ==
- 1914 in art
- List of Union Civil War monuments and memorials
