= Elisabeth Janda =

Czech musician

Elisabeth Janda (died 1780) was a Czech musician.

She was a nun in the Porta coeli Convent in Moravia. She was engaged as an organist and conductor of the choir in the convent in 1767, and became renowned for her musical talent.

Max M. Sprecher compiled and edited many collections of pieces by Elisabeth Janda, such as Lieder aus dem Ghetto and 50 Lieder Jiddisch und Deutsch, (nit Notem).
