= Brushy Mountain Line =

Military fortification line protecting Atlanta during the American Civil War

The Brushy Mountain Line or Lost Mountain Line was a military defense line protecting Atlanta during the American Civil War.

It was built in the first days of June 1864, by the Confederate army in Cobb County early in the Atlanta campaign to defend the city from an invasion by Union troops. Its eastern end was at Brushy Mountain (Cobb County)|Brushy Mountain north of Marietta and southeast of Big Shanty. The west-southwest end was first at Lost Mountain, then was moved east along Mud Creek.

The line was occupied by Confederate Gen. Joe Johnston's Army of Tennessee from June 9–18, 1864

A Georgia state historical marker is located on the road shoulder of U.S. 41 northbound, just south of Greer's Chapel and Barrett Parkway.
