= Battle of Kennesaw Mountain =

1864 battle of the American Civil War

Coordinates: 33.9363°N 84.5979°W

- Part of the American Civil War
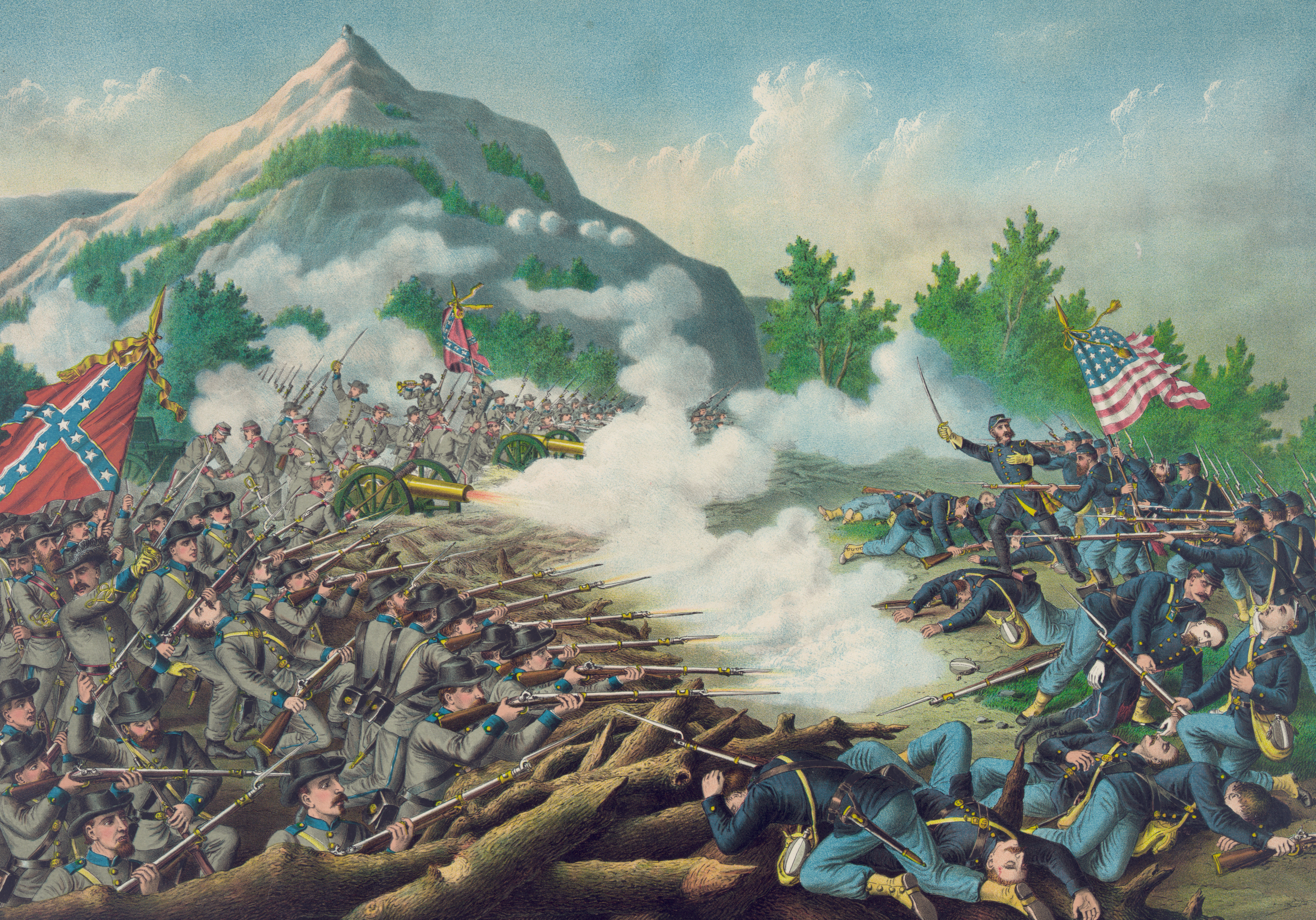
- 1891 illustration of the battle
Date	June 27, 1864
Location	Cobb County, Georgia
Result	Confederate victory

Belligerents
United States (Union)	(Confederate States of America) CSA (Confederacy)

Commanders and leaders
William T. Sherman	Joseph E. Johnston

Units involved
Military Division of the Mississippi: Army of the Cumberland; Army of the Ohio; Army of the Tennessee	Army of Tennessee

Strength
16,225	17,733

Casualties and losses
3,000	1,000

The Battle of Kennesaw Mountain was fought on June 27, 1864, during the Atlanta campaign of the American Civil War. The most significant frontal assault launched by Union Major General William T. Sherman against the Confederate Army of Tennessee under General Joseph E. Johnston, it produced a tactical defeat for the Union forces but failed to deliver the result that the Confederacy desperately needed: a halt to Sherman's advance on Atlanta, Georgia.

Sherman's 1864 campaign against Atlanta began with a series of flanking maneuvers that compelled Johnston's forces to withdraw from heavily fortified positions with minimal casualties on either side. After two months and 70 miles (110 km) of such maneuvering, Sherman's path was blocked by imposing fortifications on Kennesaw Mountain, near Marietta, Georgia. The Union general chose to change his tactics and ordered a large-scale frontal assault on June 27. Major General James B. McPherson feinted against the northern end of Kennesaw Mountain, while his corps under Major General John A. Logan assaulted Pigeon Hill on its southwest corner. At the same time, Major General George H. Thomas launched strong attacks against Cheatham Hill at the center of the Confederate line. Both attacks were repulsed with heavy losses, but a demonstration by Major General John M. Schofield achieved a strategic success by threatening the Confederate army's left flank, prompting yet another Confederate withdrawal toward Atlanta and the removal of General Johnston from command of the army.

== Background ==
In March 1864, Ulysses S. Grant was promoted to lieutenant general and named general in chief of the Union Army. He devised a strategy of multiple, simultaneous offensives against the Confederacy, hoping to prevent any of the rebel armies from reinforcing the others over interior lines. The two most significant of these were by Major General George G. Meade's Army of the Potomac, accompanied by Grant himself, which would attack Robert E. Lee's army directly and advance toward the Confederate capital of Richmond, Virginia; and Major General William T. Sherman, replacing Grant in his role as commander of the Military Division of the Mississippi, who would advance from Chattanooga, Tennessee, to Atlanta.

Both Grant and Sherman initially had objectives to engage with and destroy the two principal armies of the Confederacy, relegating the capture of important enemy cities to a secondary, supporting role. This was a strategy that President Abraham Lincoln had emphasized throughout the war, but Grant was the first general who actively cooperated with it. As their campaigns progressed, however, the political importance of the cities of Richmond and Atlanta began to dominate their strategy. By 1864, Atlanta was a critical target. The city of 20,000 was founded at the intersection of four important railroad lines that supplied the Confederacy and was a military manufacturing arsenal in its own right. Atlanta's nickname of "Gate City of the South" was apt—its capture would open virtually the entire Deep South to Union conquest. Grant's orders to Sherman were to "move against Johnston's Army, to break it up and to get into the interior of the enemy's country as far as you can, inflicting all the damage you can against their war resources."

Sherman's force of about 100,000 men was composed of three subordinate armies: the Army of the Tennessee (Grant's and later Sherman's army of 1862–63) under Major General James B. McPherson; the Army of the Cumberland under Major General George H. Thomas; and the relatively small Army of the Ohio (composed of only the XXIII Corps) under Major General John M. Schofield. Their principal opponent was the Confederate Army of Tennessee, commanded by General Joseph E. Johnston, who had replaced the unpopular Braxton Bragg after his defeat in Chattanooga in November 1863. The 50,000-man army consisted of the infantry corps of lieutenant generals William J. Hardee, John Bell Hood, and Leonidas Polk, and a cavalry corps under Major General Joseph Wheeler.

== Start of the Atlanta campaign ==
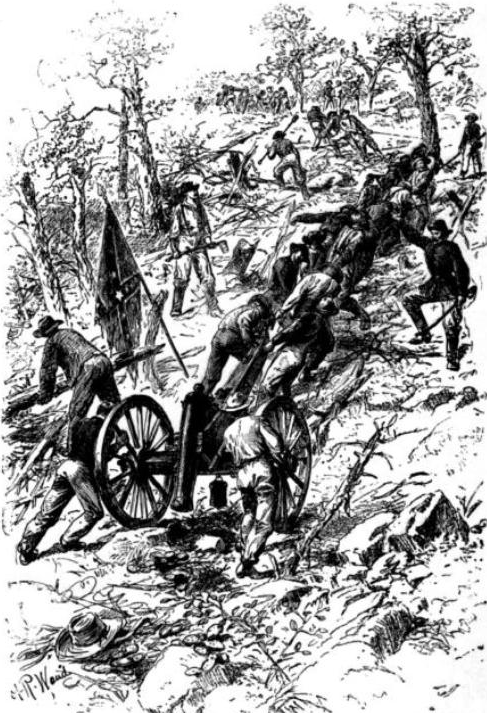
Confederate troops dragging guns up Kennesaw Mountain

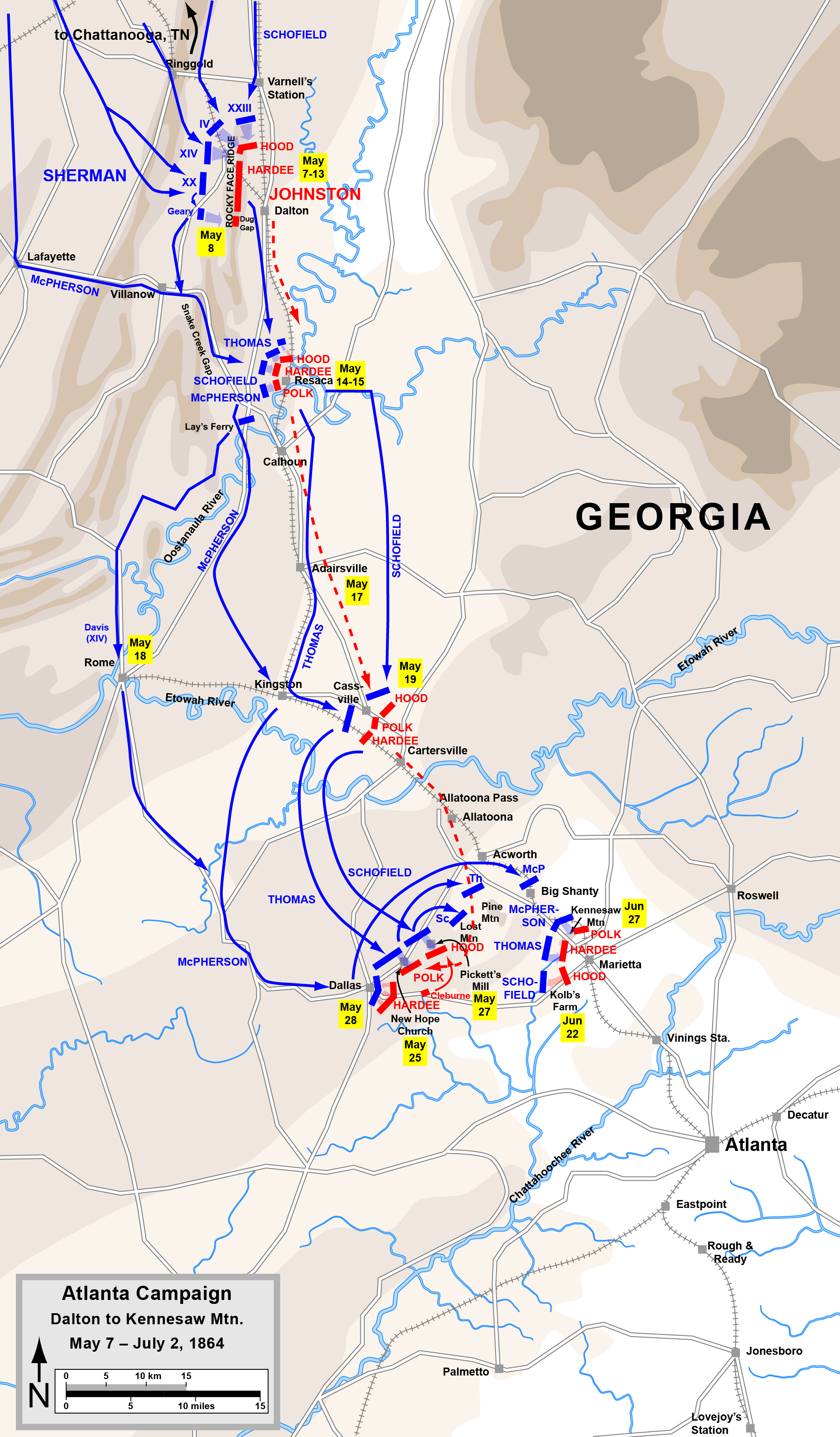
The Atlanta Campaign from Dalton to Kennesaw Mountain Confederate Union

Sherman's campaign began on May 7, as his three armies departed from the vicinity of Chattanooga. He launched demonstration attacks against Johnston's position on the long, high mountain named Rocky Face Ridge while McPherson's Army of the Tennessee advanced stealthily around Johnston's left flank toward the town of Resaca, and Johnston's supply line on the Western & Atlantic Railroad. Unfortunately for Sherman, McPherson encountered a small Confederate force entrenched in the outskirts of Resaca and cautiously pulled back to Snake Creek Gap, squandering the opportunity to trap the Confederate army. As Sherman swung his entire army in the direction of Resaca, Johnston retired to take up positions there. Full scale fighting erupted in the Battle of Resaca on May 14–15 but there was no conclusive result and Sherman flanked Johnston for a second time by crossing the Oostanaula River. As Johnston withdrew again, skirmishing erupted at Adairsville on May 17 and more general fighting on Johnston's Cassville line May 18–19. Johnston planned to defeat part of Sherman's force as it approached on multiple routes, but Hood became uncharacteristically cautious and feared encirclement, failing to attack as ordered. Encouraged by Hood and Polk, Johnston ordered another withdrawal, this time across the Etowah River.

Johnston's army took up defensive positions at Allatoona Pass south of Cartersville, but Sherman once again turned Johnston's left as he temporarily abandoned his railroad supply line and advanced on Dallas. Johnston was forced to move from his strong position and meet Sherman's army in the open. Fierce but inconclusive fighting occurred on May 25 at New Hope Church, May 27 at Pickett's Mill, and May 28 at Dallas. By June 1, heavy rains turned the roads to quagmires and Sherman was forced to return to the railroad to supply his men. Johnston's new line (called the Brushy Mountain Line) was established by June 4 northwest of Marietta, along Lost Mountain, Pine Mountain, and Brush Mountain. On June 14, following eleven days of steady rain, Sherman was ready to move again. While on a personal reconnaissance, he spotted a group of Confederate officers on Pine Mountain and ordered one of his artillery batteries to open fire. Lieutenant General Leonidas Polk, the "Fighting Bishop", was killed and Johnston withdrew his men from Pine Mountain, establishing a new line in an arc-shaped defensive position from Kennesaw Mountain to Little Kennesaw Mountain. Hood's corps attempted an unsuccessful attack at Peter Kolb's farm (the Battle of Kolb's Farm) south of Little Kennesaw Mountain on June 22. Major General William W. Loring succeeded in temporarily commanding Polk's corps.

Sherman was in a difficult position, stalled 15 miles (24 km) north of Atlanta. He could not continue his strategy of moving around Johnston's flank because of the impassable roads, and his railroad supply line was dominated by Johnston's position on top of the 1,808 foot (551 meter) tall Kennesaw Mountain. He reported to Washington "The whole country is one vast fort, and Johnston must have at least 50 miles (80 km) of connected trenches with abatis and finished batteries. We gain ground daily, fighting all the time. ... Our lines are now in close contact and the fighting incessant, with a good deal of artillery. As fast as we gain one position the enemy has another all ready. ... Kennesaw ... is the key to the whole country." Sherman decided to break the stalemate by attacking Johnston's position on Kennesaw Mountain. He issued orders on June 24 for an 8:00 a.m. attack on June 27.

== Battle ==
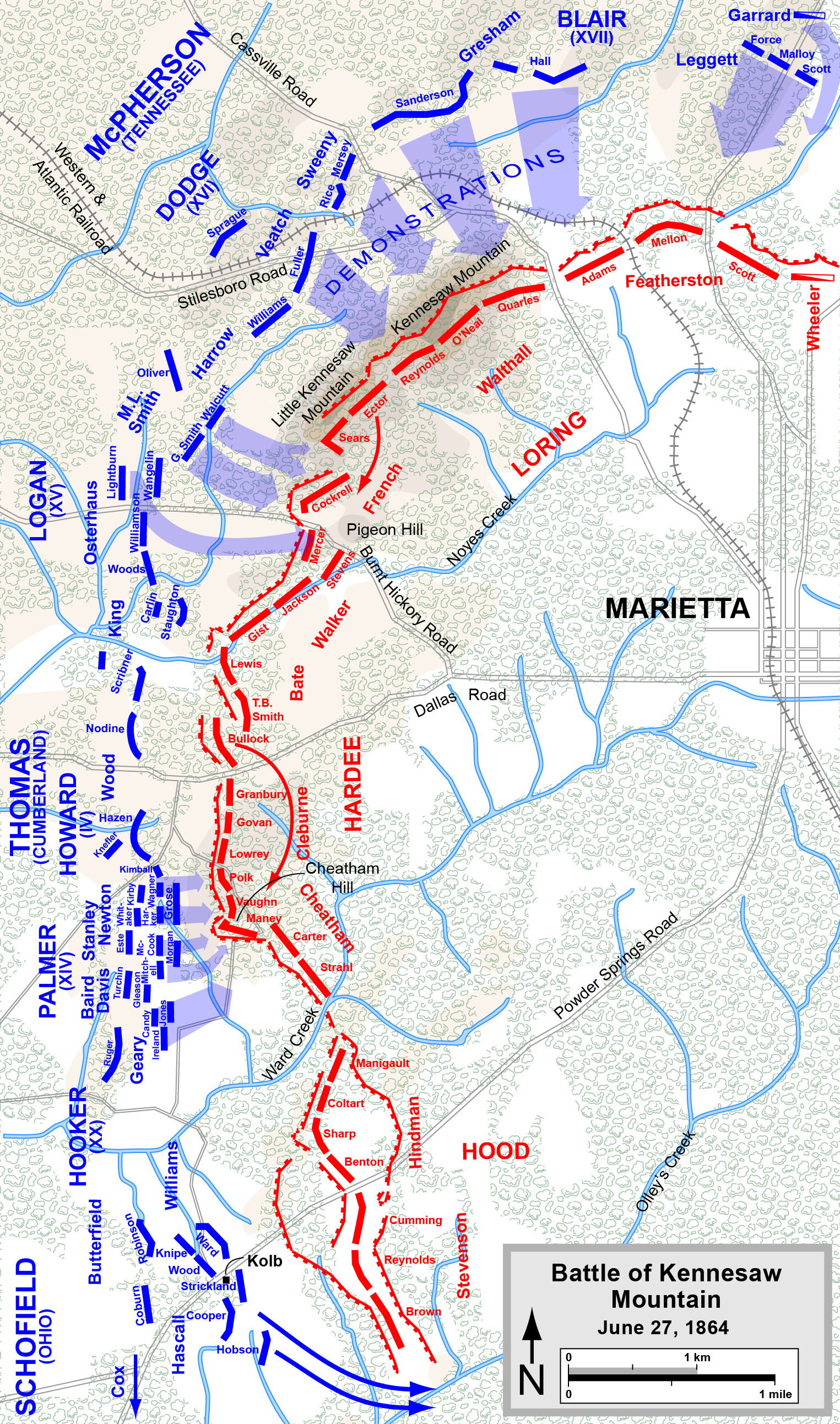
Battle of Kennesaw Mountain

Sherman's plan was first to induce Johnston to thin out and weaken his line by ordering Schofield to extend his army to the right. Then McPherson was to make a feint on his extreme left—the northern outskirts of Marietta and the northeastern end of Kennesaw Mountain—with his cavalry and a division of infantry, and to make a major assault on the southwestern end of Little Kennesaw Mountain. Meanwhile, Thomas's army was to conduct the principal attack against the Confederate fortifications in the center of their line, and Schofield was to demonstrate on the Confederate left flank and attack somewhere near the Powder Springs Road "as he can with the prospect of success."

At 8:00 a.m. on June 27, Union artillery opened a furious bombardment with over 200 guns on the Confederate works and the Rebel artillery responded in kind. Lieutenant Colonel Joseph S. Fullerton wrote, "Kennesaw smoked and blazed with fire, a volcano as grand as Etna." As the Federal infantry began moving soon afterward, the Confederates quickly determined that much of the 8 miles (13 km) wide advance consisted of demonstrations rather than concerted assaults. The first of those assaults began at around 8:30 a.m., with three brigades of Brigadier General Morgan L. Smith's division (Major General John A. Logan's XV Corps, Army of the Tennessee) moving against Loring's corps on the southern end of Little Kennesaw Mountain and the spur known as Pigeon Hill near the Burnt Hickory Road. If the attack were successful, capturing Pigeon Hill would isolate Loring's corps on Kennesaw Mountain. All three brigades were disadvantaged by the approach through dense thickets, steep and rocky slopes, and a lack of knowledge of the terrain. About 5,500 Union troops in two columns of regiments moved against about 5,000 Confederate soldiers, well entrenched.

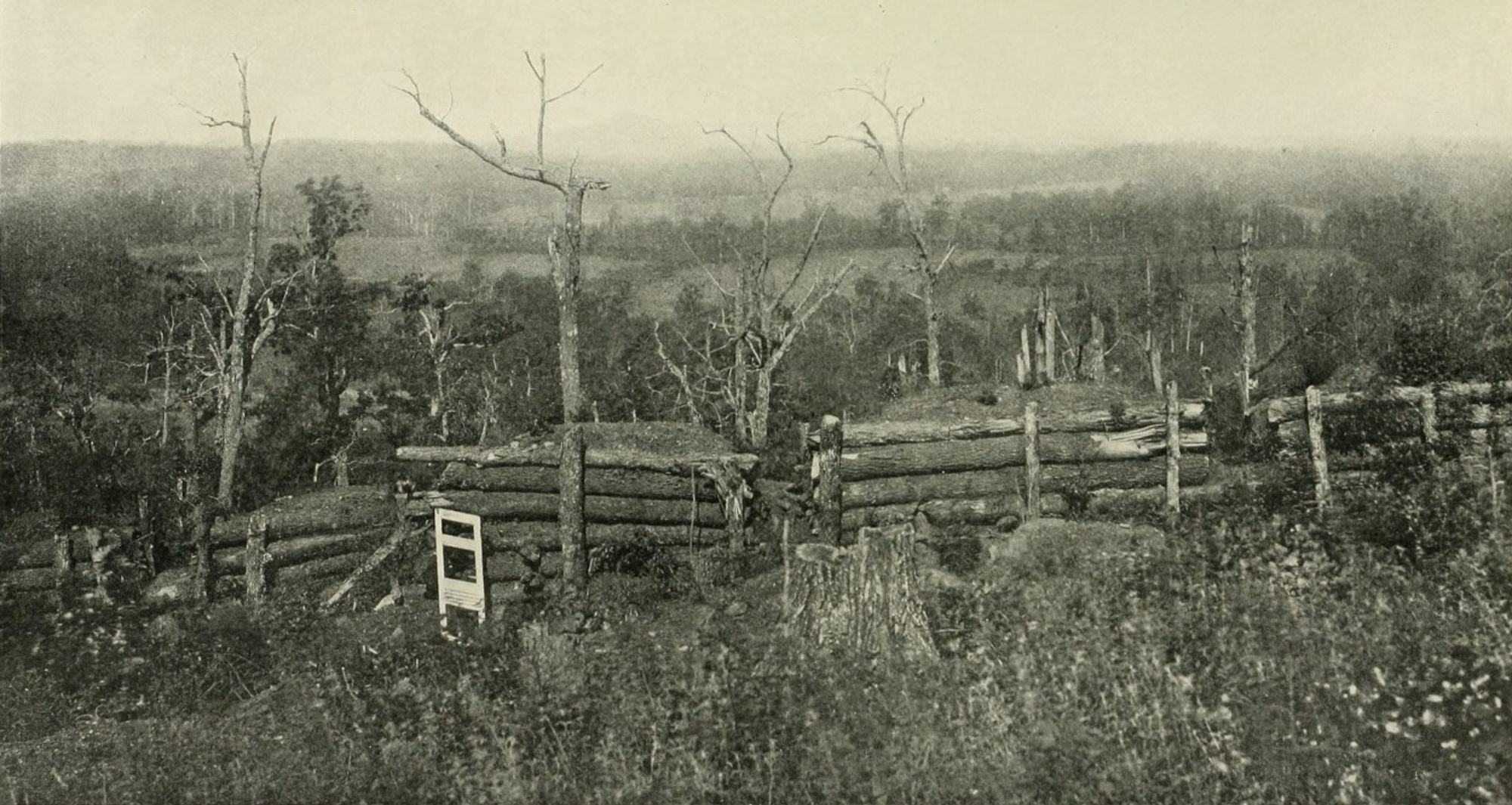
Confederate position at the Battle of Kennesaw Mountain

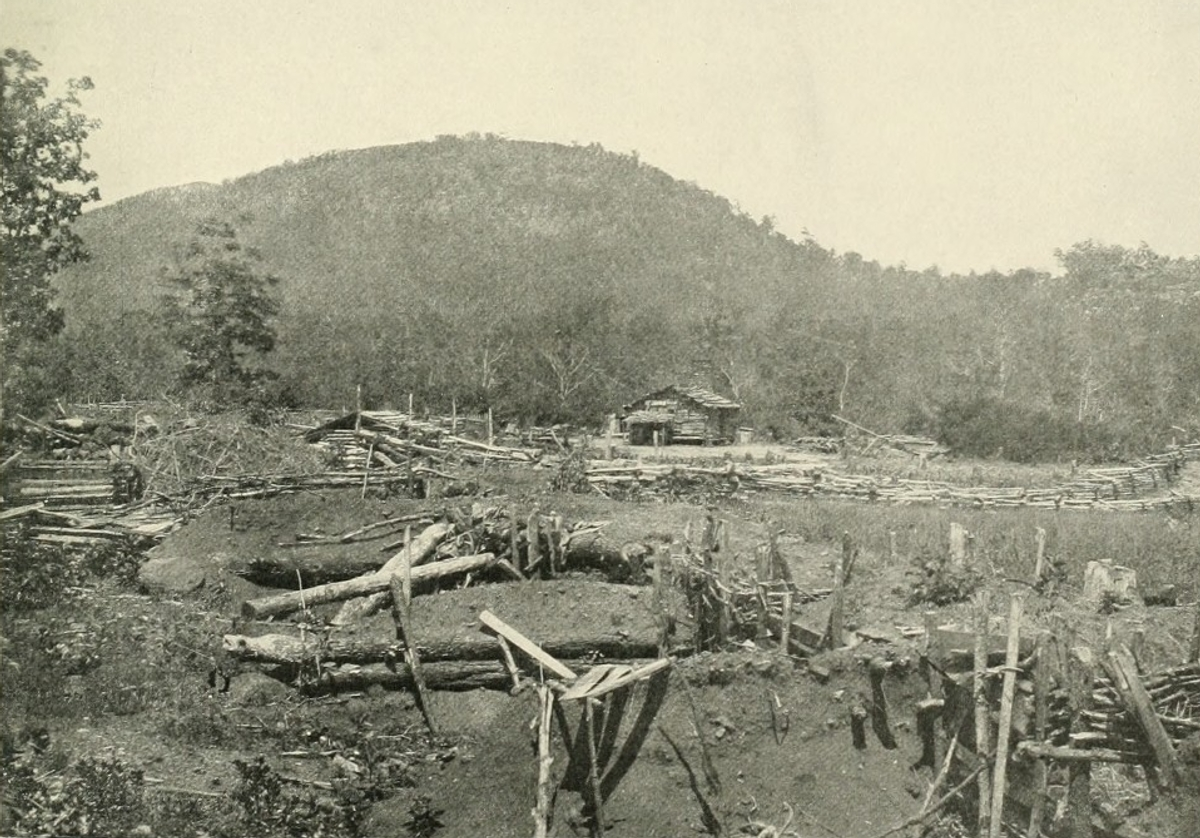
"Federal entrenchments at the foot of Kenesaw Mountain"

On the right of Smith's attack, the brigade of Brigadier General Joseph A. J. Lightburn was forced to advance through a knee-deep swamp, and were stopped short of the Confederate breastworks on the southern end of Pigeon Hill by enfilading fire. They were able to overrun the rifle pits in front of the works, but could not pierce the main Confederate line. To their left, the brigades of Colonel Charles C. Walcutt and Brigadier General Giles A. Smith crossed difficult terrain interrupted by steep cliffs and scattered with huge rocks to approach the Missouri brigade of Brigadier General Francis Cockrell. Some of the troops were able to reach as far as the abatis, but most were not and they were forced to remain stationary, firing behind trees and rocks. When General Logan rode forward to judge their progress, he determined that many of his men were being "uselessly slain" and ordered Walcutt and Smith to withdraw and entrench behind the gorge that separated the lines.

About 2 miles (3.2 km) to the south, Thomas's troops were behind schedule, but began their main attack against Hardee's corps at 9:00 a.m. Two divisions of the Army of the Cumberland—about 9,000 men under Brigadier General John Newton (Major General Oliver O. Howard's IV Corps) and Brigadier General Jefferson C. Davis (Maj. Gen. John M. Palmer's XIV Corps)—advanced in column formation rather than the typical broad line of battle against the Confederate divisions of major generals Benjamin F. Cheatham and Patrick R. Cleburne, entrenched on what is now known as "Cheatham Hill". On Newton's left, his brigade, under Brigadier General George D. Wagner, attacked through dense undergrowth, but was unable to break through the abatis and fierce rifle fire. On his right, the brigade of Brigadier General Charles G. Harker charged the Tennessee brigade of Brigadier General Alfred Vaughan and was repulsed. During a second charge, Harker was mortally wounded.

Davis's division, to the right of Newton's, also advanced in column formation. While such a movement offered the opportunity for a quick breakthrough by massing power against a narrow point, it also had the disadvantage of offering a large concentrated target to enemy guns. Their orders were to advance silently, capture the works, and then cheer to give a signal to the reserve divisions to move forward to secure the railroad and cut the Confederate army in two. Colonel Daniel McCook's brigade advanced down a slope to a creek and then crossed a wheat field to ascend the slope of Cheatham Hill. When they reached within a few yards of the Confederate works, the line halted, crouched, and began firing. But the Confederate counter fire was too strong and McCook's brigade lost two commanders (McCook and his replacement, Colonel Oscar F. Harmon), nearly all of its field officers, and a third of its men. McCook was killed on the Confederate parapet as he slashed with his sword and shouted "Surrender, you traitors!" Colonel John G. Mitchell's brigade on McCook's right suffered similar losses. After ferocious hand-to-hand fighting, the Union troops dug in across from the Confederates, ending the fighting around 10:45 a.m. Both sides nicknamed this place the "Dead Angle".

To the right of Davis's division, Major General John W. Geary's division of Major General Joseph Hooker's XX Corps advanced, but did not join in Davis's attack. Considerably farther to the right, however, was the site of the only success of the day. Schofield's army had been assigned to demonstrate against the Confederate left and he was able to put two brigades across Olley's Creek without resistance. That movement, along with an advance by Major General George Stoneman's cavalry division on Schofield's right, put Union troops within 5 miles (8.0 km) of the Chattahoochee River, closer to the last river protecting Atlanta than any unit in Johnston's army.

== Aftermath ==
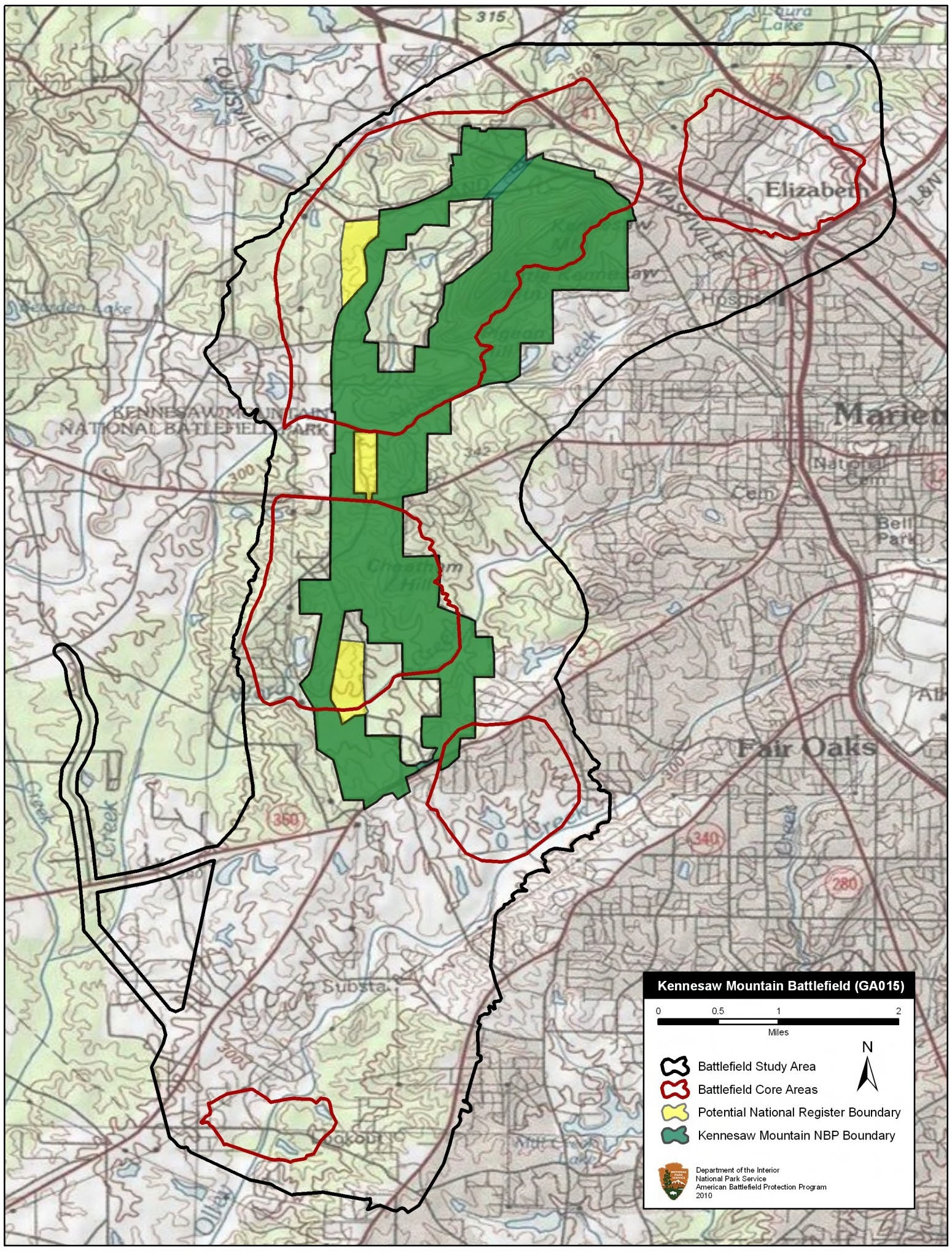
Map of Kennesaw Mountain Battlefield core and study areas by the American Battlefield Protection Program

Sherman's armies suffered about 3,000 casualties in comparison to Johnston's 1,000. The Union general was not initially deterred by these losses and he twice asked Thomas to renew the assault. "Our loss is small, compared to some of those [battles in the] East." The Rock of Chickamauga replied, however, "One or two more such assaults would use up this army." A few days later Sherman wrote to his wife, "I begin to regard the death and mangling of couple thousand men as a small affair, a kind of morning dash."

Kennesaw Mountain was not Sherman's first large-scale frontal assault of the war, but it was his last. He interrupted his string of successful flanking maneuvers in the Atlanta campaign for the logistical reasons mentioned earlier, but also so that he could keep Johnston guessing about the tactics he would employ in the future. In his report of the battle, Sherman wrote, "I perceived that the enemy and our officers had settled down into a conviction that I would not assault fortified lines. All looked to me to outflank. An army to be efficient, must not settle down to a single mode of offence, but must be prepared to execute any plan which promises success. I wanted, therefore, for the moral effect, to make a successful assault against the enemy behind his breastworks, and resolved to attempt it at that point where success would give the largest fruits of victory."

Kennesaw Mountain is usually considered a significant Union tactical defeat, but Richard M. McMurry wrote, "Tactically Johnston had won a minor defensive triumph on Loring's and Hardee's lines. Schofield's success, however, gave Sherman a great advantage, and the federal commander quickly decided to exploit it." The opposing forces spent five days facing each other at close range, but on July 2, with good summer weather at hand, Sherman sent the Army of the Tennessee and Stoneman's cavalry around the Confederate left flank and Johnston was forced to withdraw from Kennesaw Mountain to prepared positions at Smyrna.

On July 8, Sherman outflanked Johnston again—for the first time on his right—by sending Schofield to cross the Chattahoochee near the mouth of Sope Creek. The last major geographic barrier to entering Atlanta had been overcome. Alarmed at the imminent danger posed to the city of Atlanta, and frustrated with the strategy of continual withdrawals, Confederate president Jefferson Davis relieved Johnston of command on July 17, replacing him with the aggressive John Bell Hood, who was temporarily promoted to full general. Hood proceeded to attack Sherman in battles at Peachtree Creek (July 20), Atlanta/Decatur (July 22), and Ezra Church (July 28), in all of which he suffered enormous casualties without tactical advantage. Sherman besieged Atlanta for the month of August, but sent almost his entire force swinging to the south to cut off the city's last remaining railroad connection. In the Battle of Jonesboro (August 31 and September 1), Hood attacked again to save his railroad, but was unsuccessful and was forced to evacuate Atlanta. Sherman's men entered the city on September 2 and Sherman telegraphed President Lincoln, "Atlanta is ours, and fairly won." This milestone was arguably one of the key factors enabling Lincoln's reelection in November.

== A soldier's perspective ==
The battle is described from the perspective of Sam Watkins, a volunteer in the 1st Tennessee Infantry Regiment of the Confederate Army, in the book Company Aytch (see the section entitled "Dead Angle, on the Kennesaw Line").

== Battlefield today ==
The site of the battle is now part of Kennesaw Mountain National Battlefield Park, where both Confederate deliberate trenches on top of the mountain and some Union rifle pits are still visible. The American Battlefield Trust and its partners have saved almost four acres of battlefield land outside the park as of mid-2023.

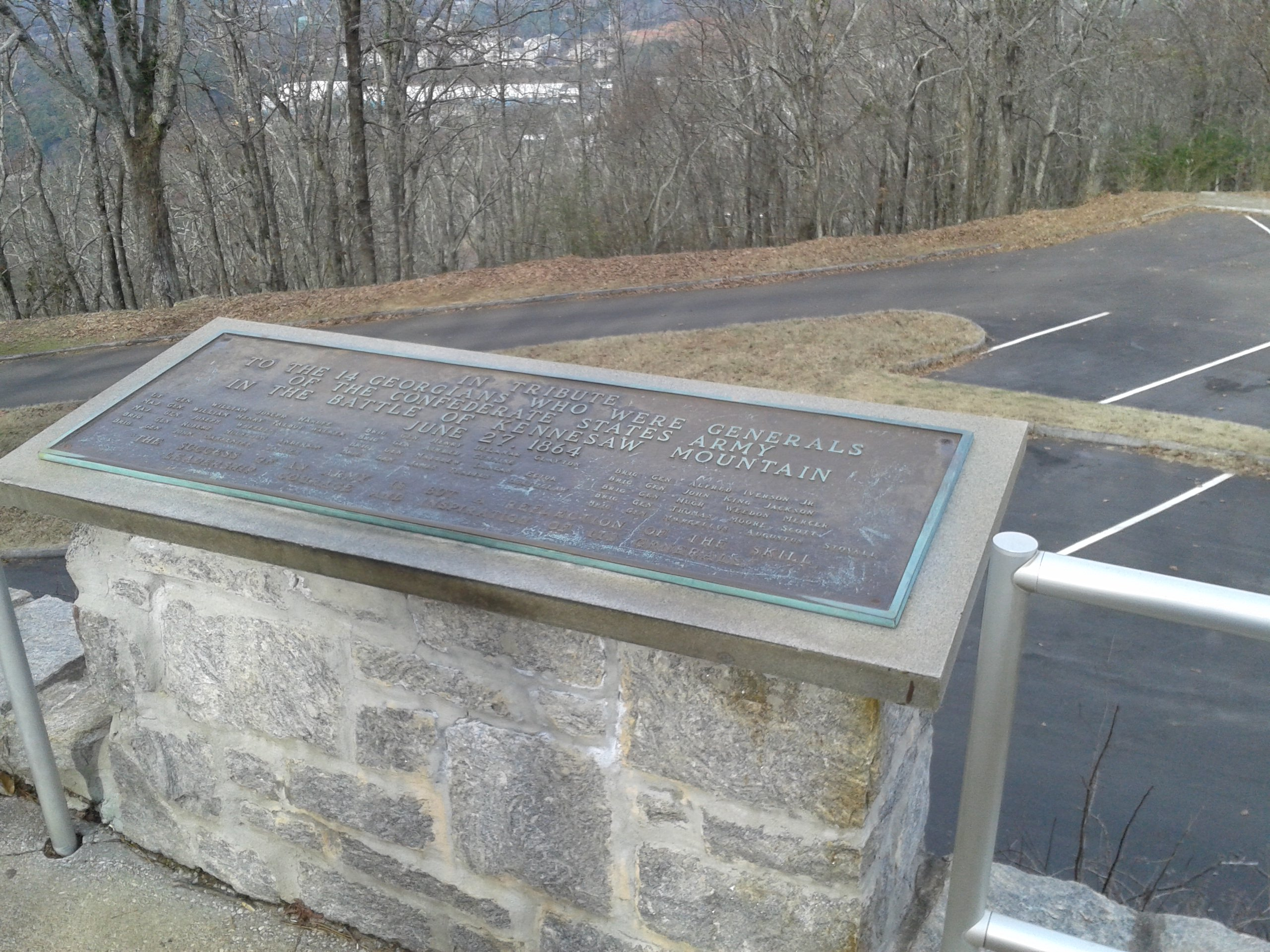
Kennesaw Mountain Battlefield Monument

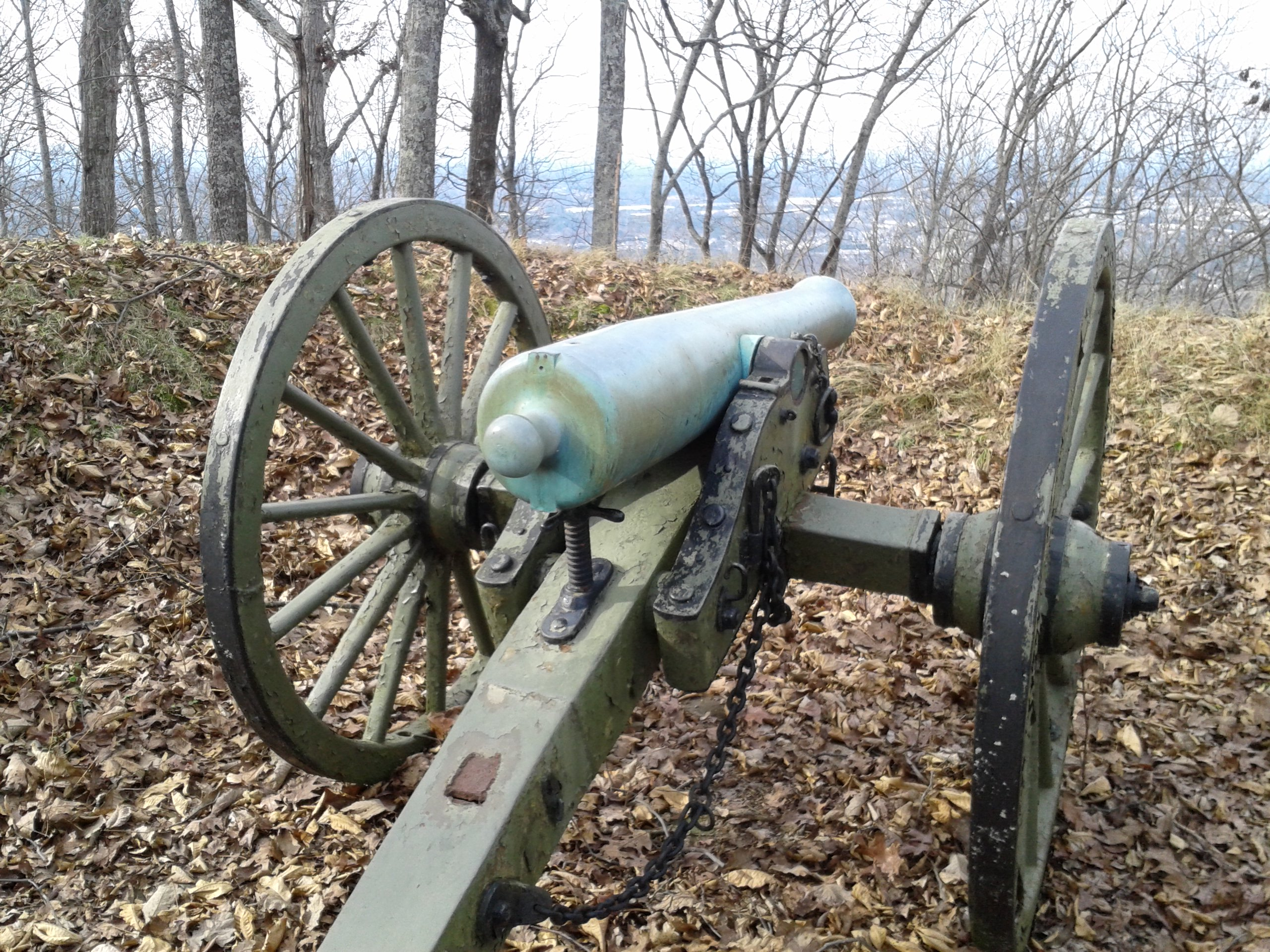
Kennesaw Mountain Battlefield cannon

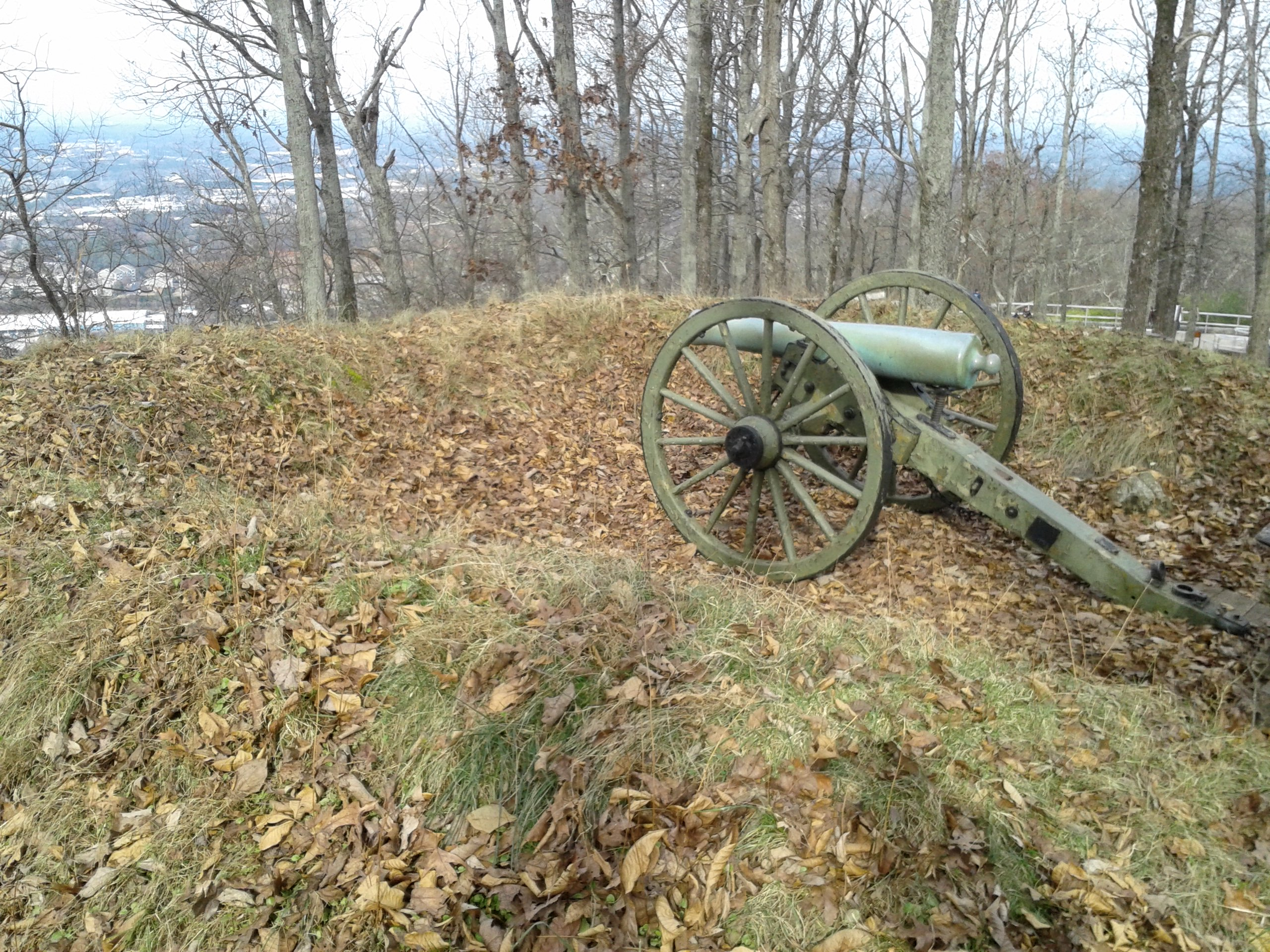
Kennesaw Mountain Battlefield approach

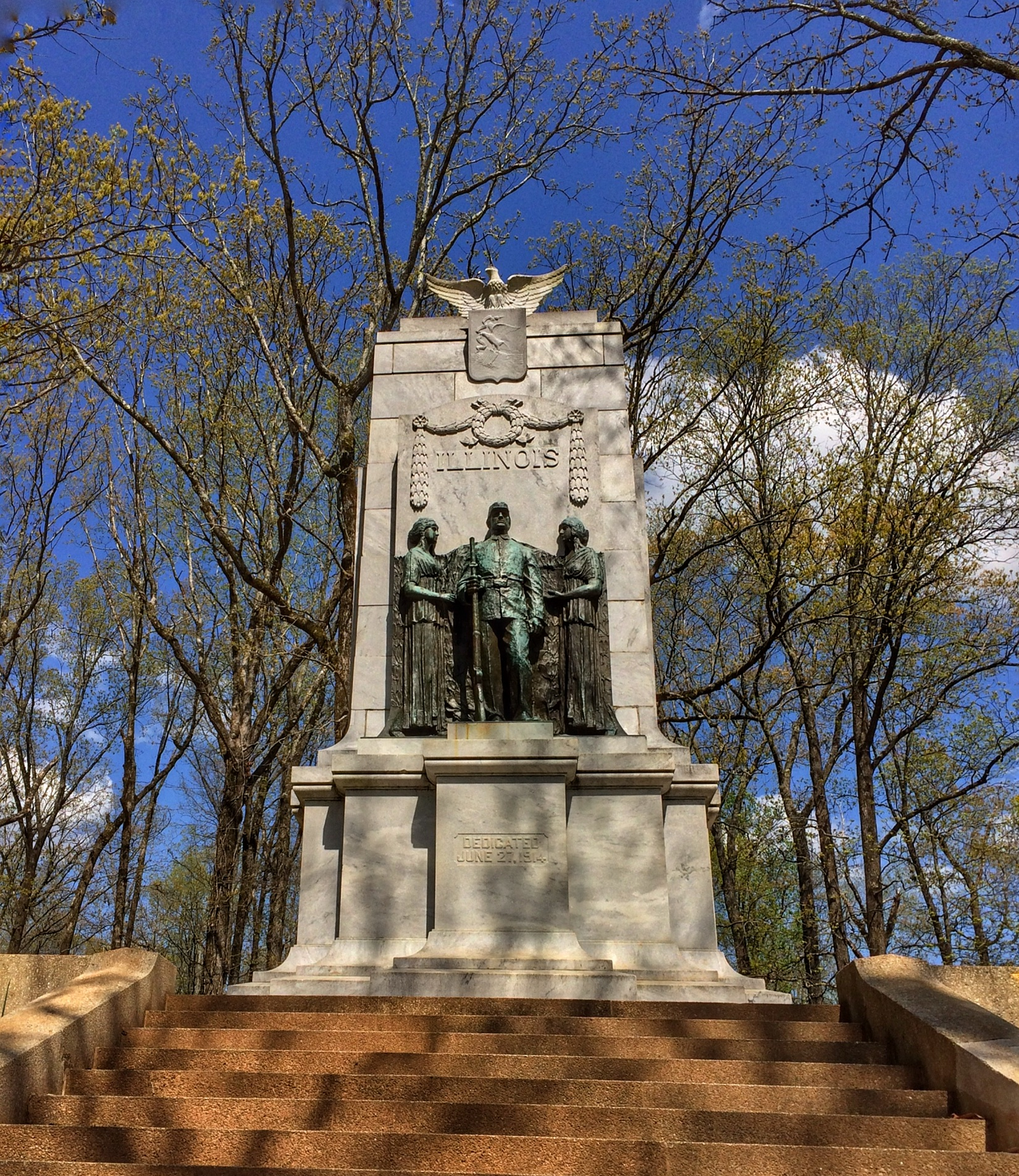
Illinois Monument
