= Kennesaw Mountain =

Mountain of the Appalachians in Cobb County, Georgia, United States

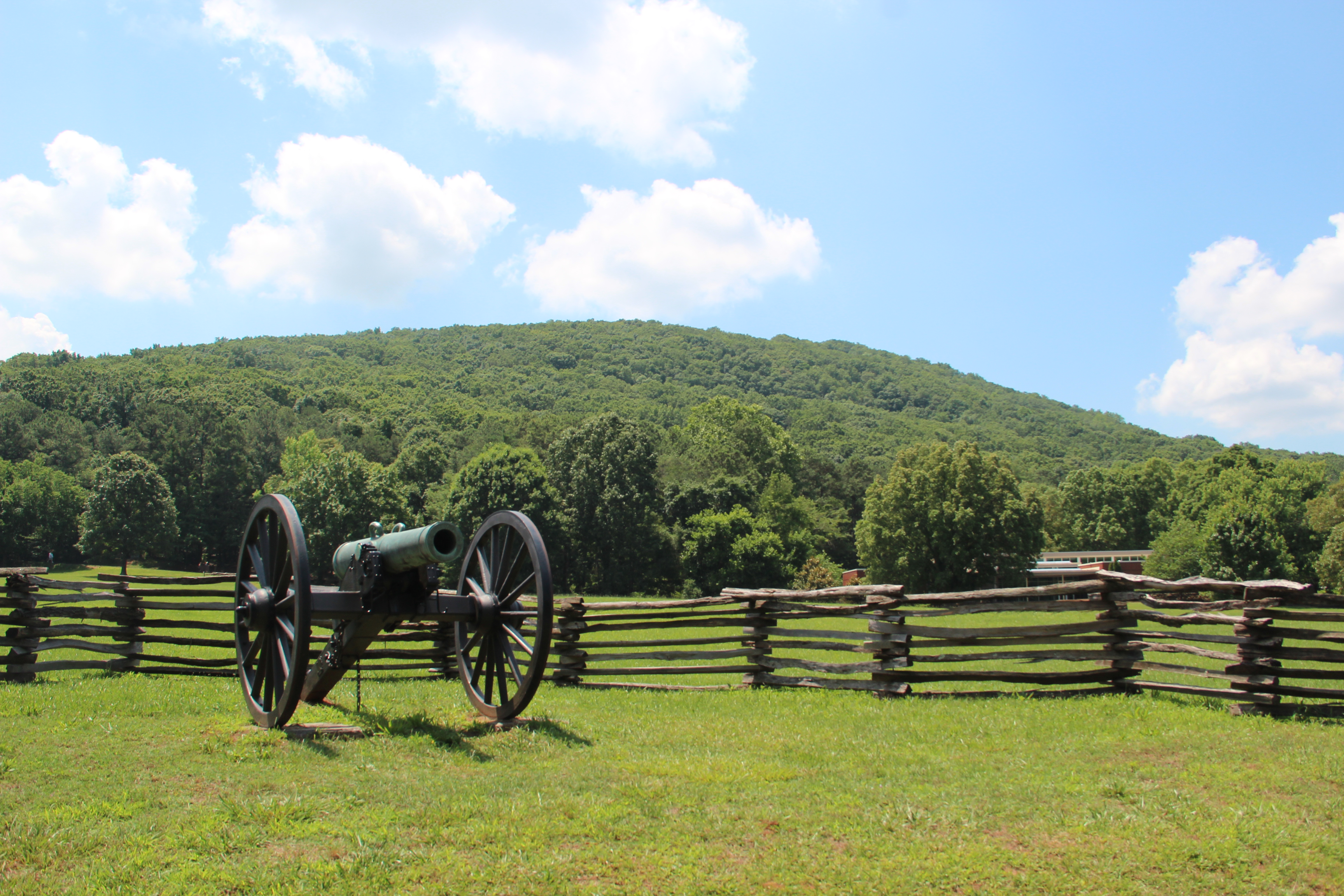
- Kennesaw Mountain

Highest point
- Elevation: 1,808 ft (551 m)
- Prominence: approx. 800 feet (250 m)
- Coordinates: 33°58′34″N 84°34′47″W

Geography
- Location: Cobb County, Georgia, U.S.
- Parent range: Appalachian Mountains
- Topo map: USGS Marietta

Kennesaw Mountain is a mountain between Marietta and Kennesaw, Georgia, U.S., with a summit elevation of 1,808 feet (551 m). It is the highest point in the core (urban and suburban) metro Atlanta area, and fifth after further-north exurban counties are considered. The local terrain averages roughly 1,000 feet (300 m) AMSL.

The mountain has two summits:

- "Big Kennesaw", where the modern-day parking area and scenic overlook are located
- Little Kennesaw Mountain, where several light hiking trails and nature areas connect the mountains to the rest of the park

== History ==
Kennesaw Mountain was originally a home to the mound builders from around 900 to around 1700 AD. Their descendants, the Creek people, were pushed out of Georgia by the Cherokee, who were then exiled by the United States and the state of Georgia on the Trail of Tears to the Oklahoma Territory during the Georgia Gold Rush.

In December 1832, Cobb County, where Kennesaw Mountain is located, was created. This was just short of a year of being in Cherokee "county", a territory that included all of northwest Georgia.

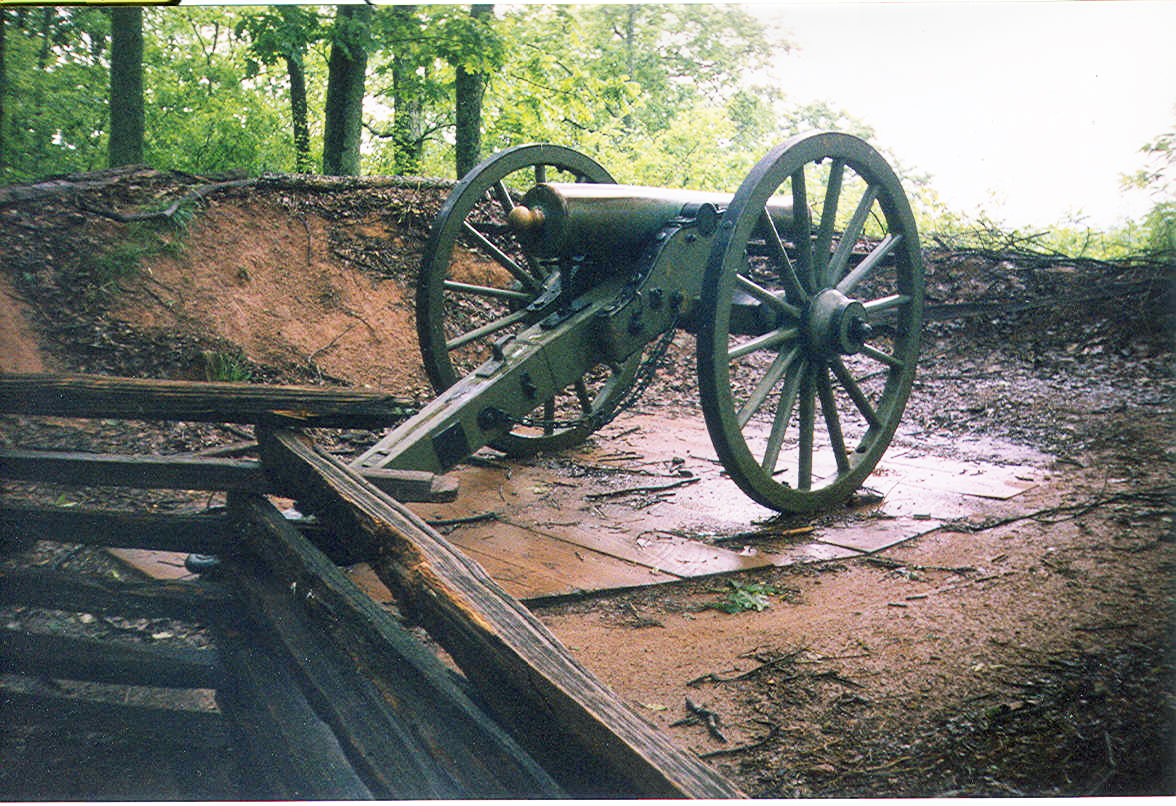
Cannon on Kennesaw Mountain in recreated artillery position.

Kennesaw Mountain was the site of the Battle of Kennesaw Mountain during the 1864 Atlanta campaign of the American Civil War, in which the Union forces of General William Tecumseh Sherman launched a misguided bloody frontal attack on the Confederate Army of Tennessee, commanded by General Joseph E. Johnston. Although a tactical defeat for the Union, the battle failed to turn back Sherman, who went on to take Atlanta, and then launched his March to the Sea.

Federal judge Kenesaw Mountain Landis, the first commissioner of Major League Baseball, was named after the battle, in which his father nearly lost his left leg.

The nearby city of Kennesaw, founded as Big Shanty, was renamed for the mountain after the war, although the mountain lies outside city limits. Kennesaw Mountain High School is another namesake.

The Kennesaw Mountain National Battlefield Park was created on June 26, 1935. It was formerly a Civilian Conservation Corps camp.

== Wildlife ==
Kennesaw Mountain is a major stopover location for several species of migrating songbirds. There are more than 25 species of warblers such as the worm-eating warbler, yellow warbler, yellow-throated warbler, Nashville warbler, black-throated blue warbler, and the rare cerulean warbler.

== Other information ==
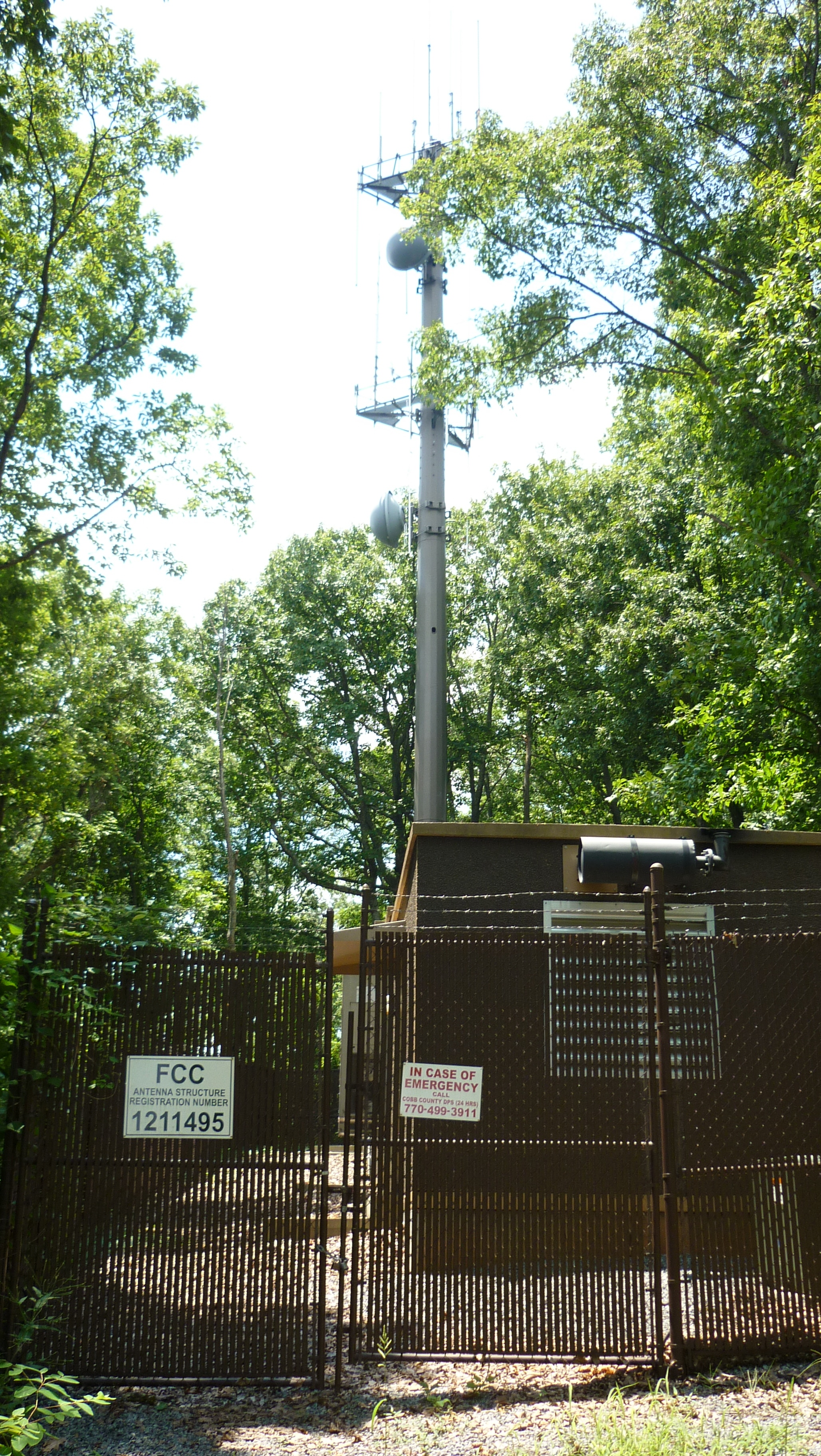
Antenna Tower at Kennesaw Mountain

At the base of the mountain, the park entrance hosts an interpretive center, museum, and numerous self-guided tour trails that document Union General William Tecumseh Sherman's "March to the Sea" during the Civil War.

The road to the top is open weekdays to cars, and on weekends only to park buses, which offer transportation to visitors. The road is closed during and after winter weather, as there is no snow removal.

Several small radio antennas, which are atop the mountain near the summit, belong to the U.S. government and the government of Georgia. Originally on four separate wooden telephone poles, they were consolidated to a metal monopole around 2005. The Quonset huts which house the transmitters and other telecom equipment are painted solid green or brown to camouflage them. Power lines are buried, and generators supply backup power in the event of a power failure.

A stylized representation of Kennesaw Mountain's distinctive twin peaks is part of the logo for nearby Kennesaw State University.

Marietta's Kennestone Hospital takes its name from the nearby Kennesaw Mountain and the more distant Stone Mountain.

On September 1, 2016, Adam Young released a ten-track instrumental e-album called Corduroy Road, based on Sherman's March to the Sea. The fifth track was called Kennesaw Mountain.

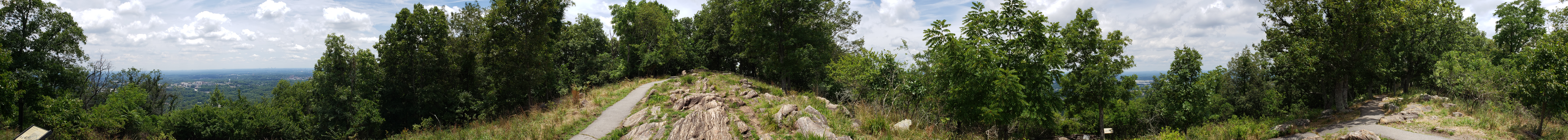
Panoramic view from the summit of Kennesaw Mountain

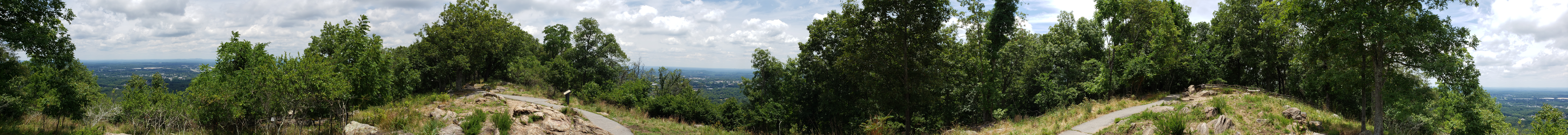
Another panoramic view
