= Zora Jandová =

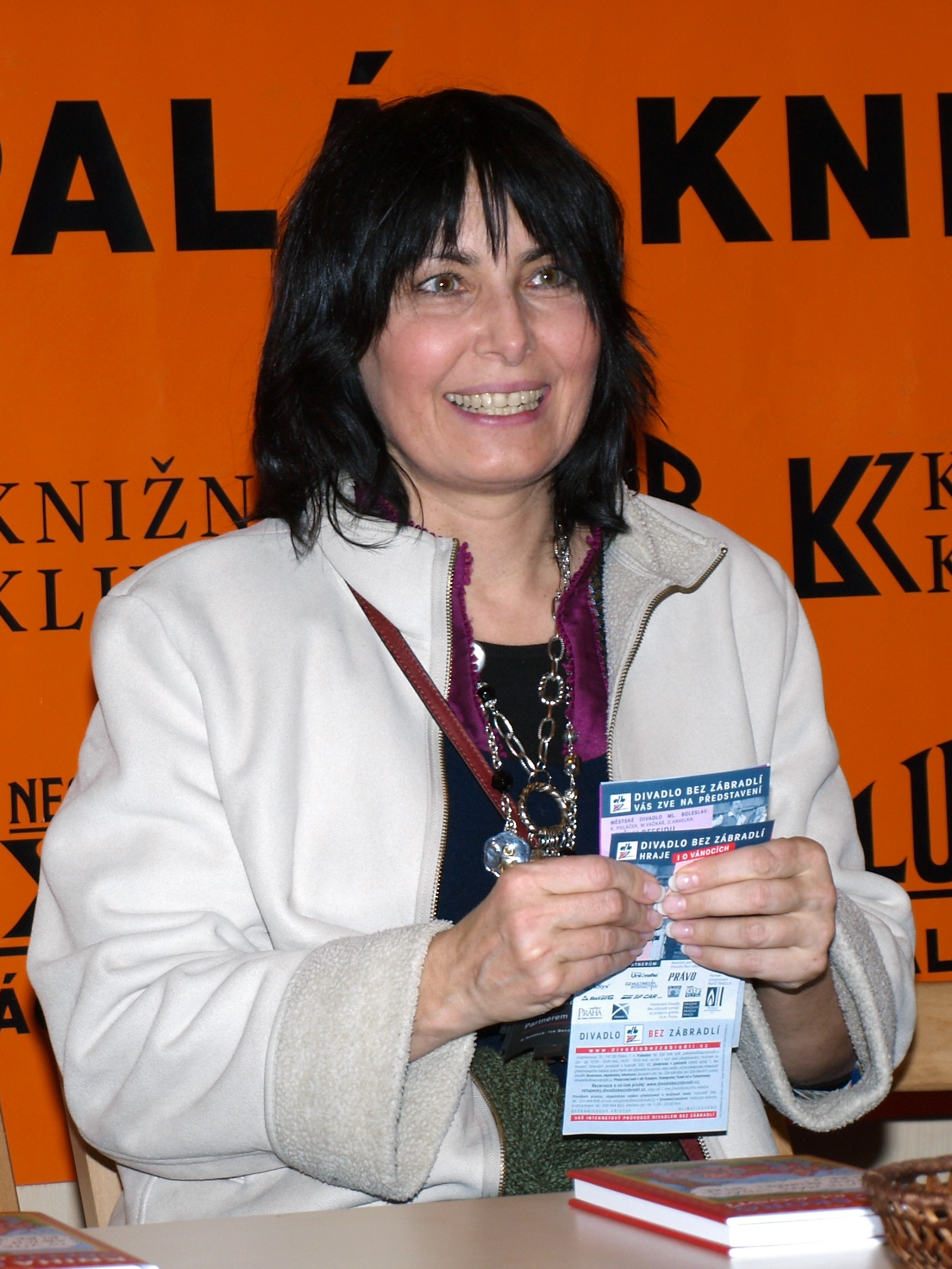
- Jandová in 2009

Background information
- Birth name: Zora Jandová
- Born: 6 September 1958 (age 66); Prague, Czechoslovakia
- Occupations: Actress; Radio presenter; Tai chi practitioner
- Years active: 1974–present

Zora Jandová (born 6 September 1958) is a Czech actress, radio presenter, and tai chi practitioner. She studied at the Faculty of Theatre in Prague, graduating in 1982. She acted at the National Theatre in Prague between 1982 and 1985.

== Selected filmography ==
- Mravenci nesou smrt (1985)
- Chán Sulejmán a víla Fatmé (1985)
- The Seven Ravens (1993)
- Maigret (television, 1996)
- Dobrá čtvrť (television, 2008)
- Nemocnice na kraji města – nové osudy (television, 2008)
