= Ludmila Jandová =

Czech painter (1938–2008)

- Born: 3 August 1938; Osík
- Died: 20 October 2008 (aged 70)
- Known for: Painter

Ludmila Jandová (3 August 1938 – 20 October 2008) was a Czech painter and printmaker.

Born in Osík, Jandová studied first in Železný Brod at the glassmaking school before traveling to Prague for further study. There, she entered the Academy of Fine Arts, Prague in 1966, studied under Vladimir Silovsky and Vojtěch Tittelbach, and graduated in 1969. During her career, she produced graphic art of various types, as well as illustrations, drawings, paintings, and pastels; at times she also worked in collage and other disciplines. Her work often depicted Christian subjects. She died after a long illness.

Three prints by Jandová are owned by the National Gallery of Art.
