= Kim Janda =

American chemist (born 1957)

Kim D. Janda (born August 23, 1957) is an American chemist whose research focuses on the fields of medicinal chemistry, molecular biology, immunology and neuropharmacology.

Janda currently holds the rank of the Ely R. Callaway, Jr. Chaired Professor in the Departments of Chemistry and Immunology at The Scripps Research Institute (TSRI) in La Jolla, California, and is also the director of the Worm Institute of Research and Medicine (WIRM) and a Skaggs Scholar within the Skaggs Institute of Chemical Biology, both at TSRI. He has been the recipient of numerous awards including an NIH First Award (1990), Sloan Fellowship (1993) and the Arthur C. Cope Scholar Award (1999).

== Education ==
Janda obtained a B.S. in clinical chemistry from the University of South Florida in 1980. He then studied at the University of Arizona and obtained a M.S. in organic chemistry (1983) and a Ph.D. in 1984. He carried out postdoctoral research with Richard Lerner at the Research Institute of Scripps Clinic (which would later become The Scripps Research Institute), where he remained, becoming a full professor in 1996.

== Research ==
=== Immunology ===
Janda's independent career started working on catalytic antibodies. In 1993, his group was the first to describe how a catalytic antibody can reroute a chemically disfavored reaction to give an endo Diels-Alder cyclization product rather than the uncatalyzed exo product. A second research infusion in this area attributable to Janda was the elucidation of the concept of reactive immunization.

A second area of research Janda's group has pioneered is the field of "immunopharmacotherapy" a term coined by Janda's laboratory to describe the use of the immune system to target drug addiction and obesity. Janda demonstrated that one could manipulate the immune system to generate antibodies against cocaine. He has demonstrated that antibodies resulting from this approach can protect from the lethal effects of cocaine overdose, even when administered after cocaine exposure. Recently, he detailed the treatment of cocaine addiction with viruses. Janda and colleagues then showed that an active vaccine against the orexigenic hormone ghrelin can slow the rate of weight gain, and adiposity, and do this through an entirely metabolic mechanism, as food intake was unchanged.

=== Encoded combinatorial libraries ===
Another area of medicinal research in which the Janda laboratory has made contributions encompasses techniques to create molecular diversity, uncover active components from complex mixtures and the separation of synthetic targets by phase tagging. He has published methodologies that allow implementation of what has been termed "encoded combinatorial libraries", providing a means whereby the alternating parallel synthesis of peptides and oligonucleotides can be performed in a routine manner. His group has also demonstrated a technology termed "recursive deconvolution of combinatorial libraries" and "liquid phase combinatorial synthesis" which showed that reactants, products and by-products can be effectively "tagged" and targeted to different phases.

=== Nornicotine ===
The Janda laboratory demonstrated that nornicotine, a constituent of tobacco, can catalyze aldol reactions in water: the only known example of a metabolite capable of serving as a catalyst. This finding has led him to propose new chemical links between smoking and metabolic diseases, including that nornicotine causes aberrant protein glycation and thus provides an unrecognized pathway for the development of the pathology of tobacco use disorder; additionally nornicotine also catalyzes the covalent modification of certain prescription drugs such as the commonly used steroid, prednisone. These findings were crucial to his group’s publication on the glycation of the amyloid β-peptide by nornicotine, proposing the hypothesis that there is a fortuitous chemical dynamic between smoking and Alzheimer's disease. More recently, Janda’s group has found that nornicotine can also catalyze the isomerization of retinal molecules, implicating nornicotine in the pathology of both age-related macular degeneration as well as smoking-related developmental abnormalities. Lastly, his group has linked this glycation process to methamphetamine addiction.

=== Cell-to-cell communication ===
Janda’s group has also begun explorations in the area of cell-to-cell communication. His group was the first to report a successful chemical synthesis of AI-2, a compound that is employed by both Gram positive and Gram negative bacteria for interspecies communication. The completion of the synthesis has allowed the validation of a boronate ester complex of AI-2 as the active signaling species in the symbiotic bacteria V. harveyi.

=== Cancer therapy ===
Janda has also worked creating peptide and antibody molecules for the treatment of cancer. By employing a novel approach, he was able to access and screen a wide range of proteins using both sequence space and conformational space. By panning this library against a B lymphoctye cell line, a unique cell-binding and internalizing peptide was discovered. Further mechanistic studies of this peptide uncovered a dimerization "switch" that modulates the cell-penetrating activity. In addition to these studies, Janda has also examined the development of effective immunotherapies for the treatment of cancer. His group has demonstrated that a synthetically prepared cell-surface glycosphingolipid can be utilized as a panning reagent to identify fully human single chain antibodies (scFvs) that are selective for melanoma and breast tumor cells. The Janda laboratory has also identified a scFv specific for the integrin α_{3}β_{1} that is internalized by human pancreatic cancer cells; subsequent studies have employed this antibody conjugated with the potent cytotoxic compound duocarmycin SA for the selective delivery of chemotherapeutic agents.

== Professional awards and associations ==
- Member of the Board of Trustees, The Skaggs Institute for Research, 2006
- Arthur C. Cope Scholar Award, 1999
- Alfred P. Sloan Fellowship, 1993–1995
- NIH FIRST Award, 1990–1995
- Fellow, American Institute of Chemists, 1986–present
- American Chemical Society, 1981–present

== See also ==
- The Scripps Research Institute
