= Kennesaw Mountain National Battlefield Park =

Public park and historic Civil War location in Georgia

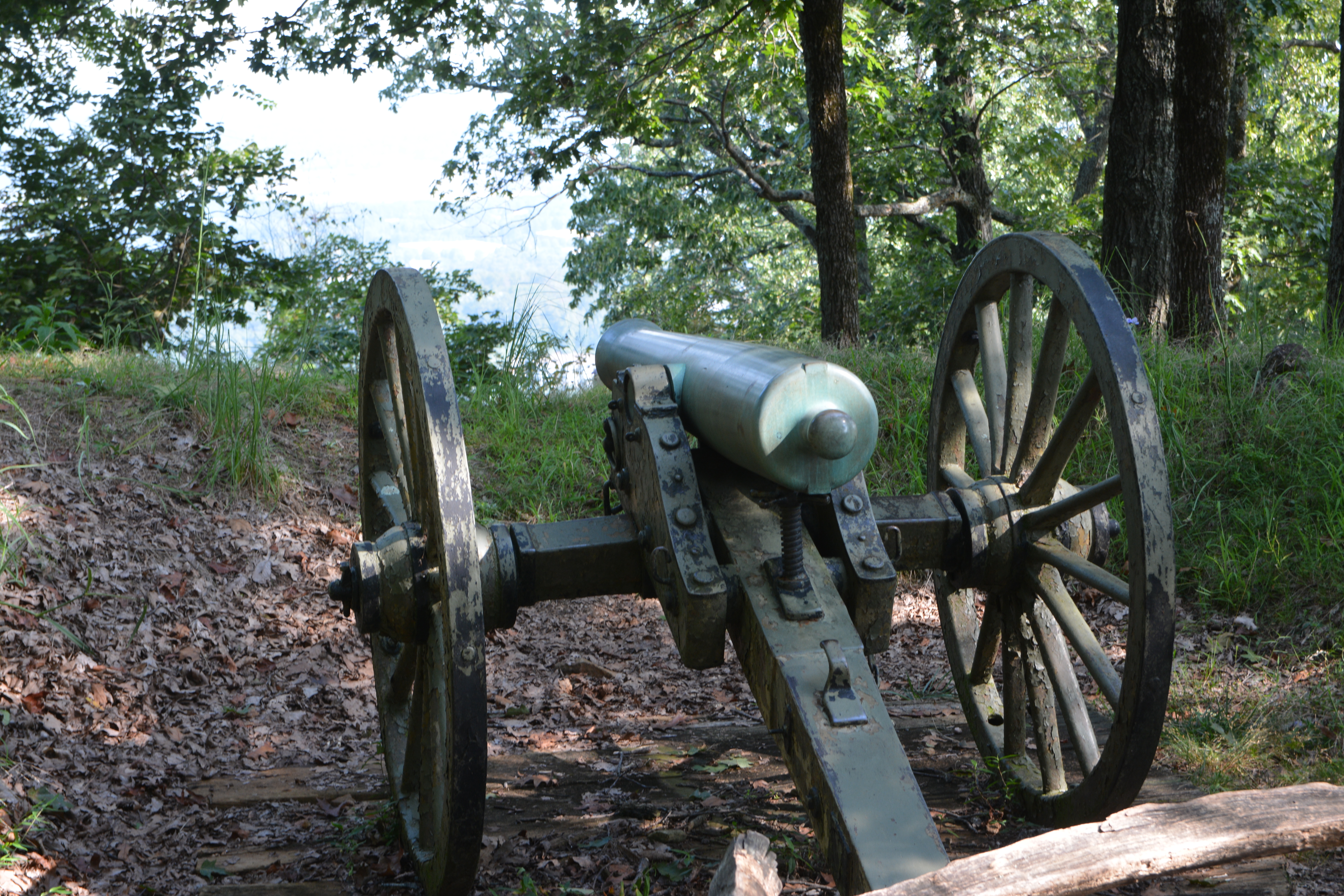
- Recreated artillery position on Kennesaw Mountain

- Location within Georgia Location within the United States
- Location: Cobb County, Georgia, USA
- Nearest city: Marietta, GA
- Coordinates: 33°58′59″N 84°34′41″W
- Area: 2,913.63 acres (11.7910 km^{2})
- Established: February 18, 1917
- Visitors: 1,179,671 (in 2025)
- Governing body: National Park Service
- Website: Kennesaw Mountain National Battlefield Park
- Kennesaw Mountain National Battlefield Park
- U.S. National Register of Historic Places
- U.S. Historic district
- Location within Metro Atlanta Location within Georgia Location within the United States
- Nearest city: Marietta, Georgia
- Area: 2,923 acres (1,182.9 ha)
- Built: 1933
- Architect: Peter Valentine Kolb
- Architectural style: Federal, Moderne
- NRHP reference No.: 66000063
- Added to NRHP: October 15, 1966

Kennesaw Battlefield Park preserves a Civil War battleground of the Atlanta campaign, and also contains Kennesaw Mountain. It is located at 900 Kennesaw Mountain Drive, between Marietta and Kennesaw, Georgia. The name "Kennesaw" derives from the Cherokee Indian "Gah-nee-sah" meaning "cemetery" or burial ground. The area was designated as a U.S. historic district on October 15, 1966. Part of the natural area is old-growth forest and recognized by the Old-Growth Forest Network.

== History ==
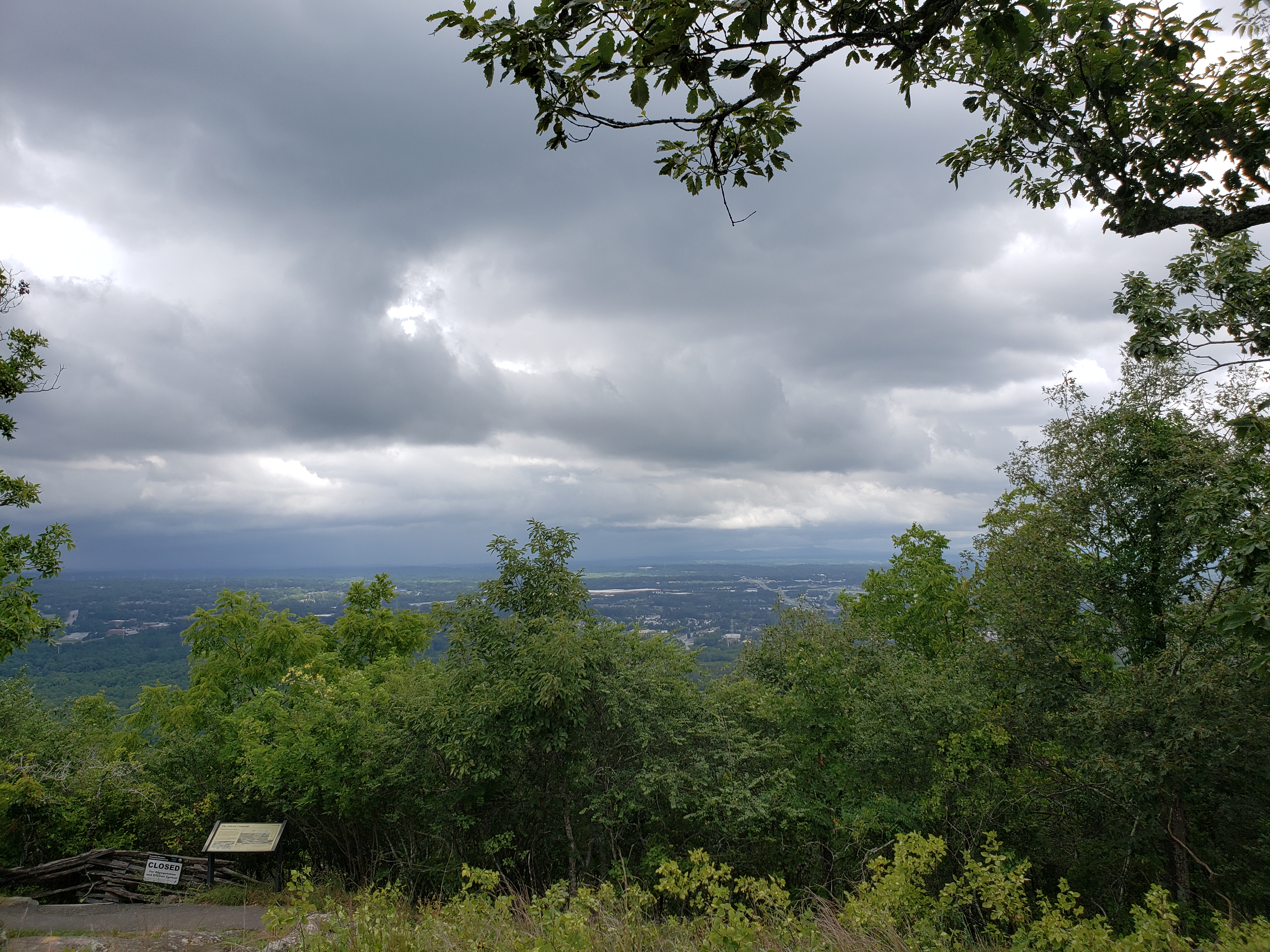
Summit of Kennesaw Mountain, summer afternoon thunderstorms approaching

The Battle of Kennesaw Mountain, fought here between Generals William Tecumseh Sherman of the Union army and Joseph E. Johnston of the Confederate army, took place between June 18, 1864, and July 2, 1864. Sherman's army consisted of 100,000 men, 254 cannons and 35,000 horses, while Johnston's army had only 50,000 men and 187 cannons. Johnston had successfully contrived to block Sherman's advance with another defensive position, and this time Sherman tried a direct frontal assault. Much of the battle took place not on Kennesaw Mountain itself, but on a spur of Little Kennesaw Mountain known now as Pigeon Hill, and the area to its south around Cheatham Hill. A total of 5,350 soldiers died during the battle, which was deemed a Confederate victory, but Johnston's army nonetheless retired.

== Park ==
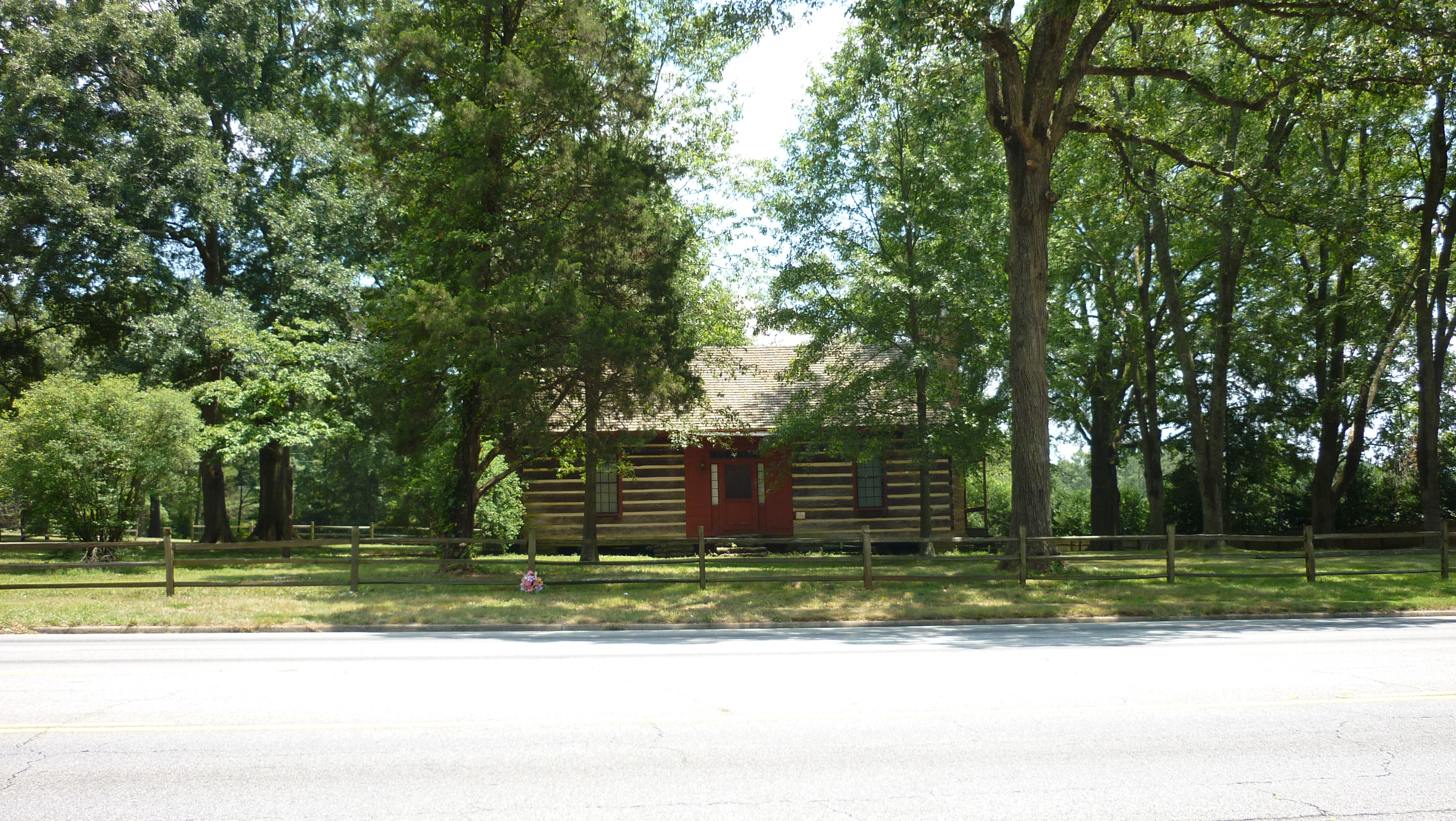
Peter Valentine Kolb's Farm House at Kennesaw Mountain National Battlefield Park

Established as Kennesaw Mountain National Battlefield Site on February 18, 1917, it was transferred from the War Department on August 10, 1933, and redesignated a national military park on June 26, 1935. As with all historic areas administered by the National Park Service, the park was listed on the National Register of Historic Places on October 15, 1966.

Kennesaw Mountain Battlefield Park is a 2,923-acre (11.8 km^{2}) National Battlefield that preserves a Civil War battleground of the Atlanta Campaign. There are three battlefield areas: In front of the Visitor Center, off Burnt Hickory Road and a major site at Cheatham Hill (commonly known as the Dead Angle). At the southern tip of the park, Peter Valentine Kolb's farm house, where a minor battle was fought, has been restored to its original condition. The Visitor Center contains an information desk, museum, and a theater which screens movies about the battle fought there. While walking some of the 17.3 miles (27.8 km) of interpretive hiking trails, historic earthworks, cannon emplacements, and various interpretive signs can be seen. There are three monuments representing some of the states who fought here - Illinois, Texas, and Georgia. Kennesaw Mountain is 1,808 feet (551.1 m) above sea level. It is approximately a 664-foot (202 m) gain in elevation from the Visitor Center to the mountain's summit. The hike up is approximately 1.4 miles (2.3 km) on the road and 1.1-mile (1.8 km) on the trail.

== Mission ==
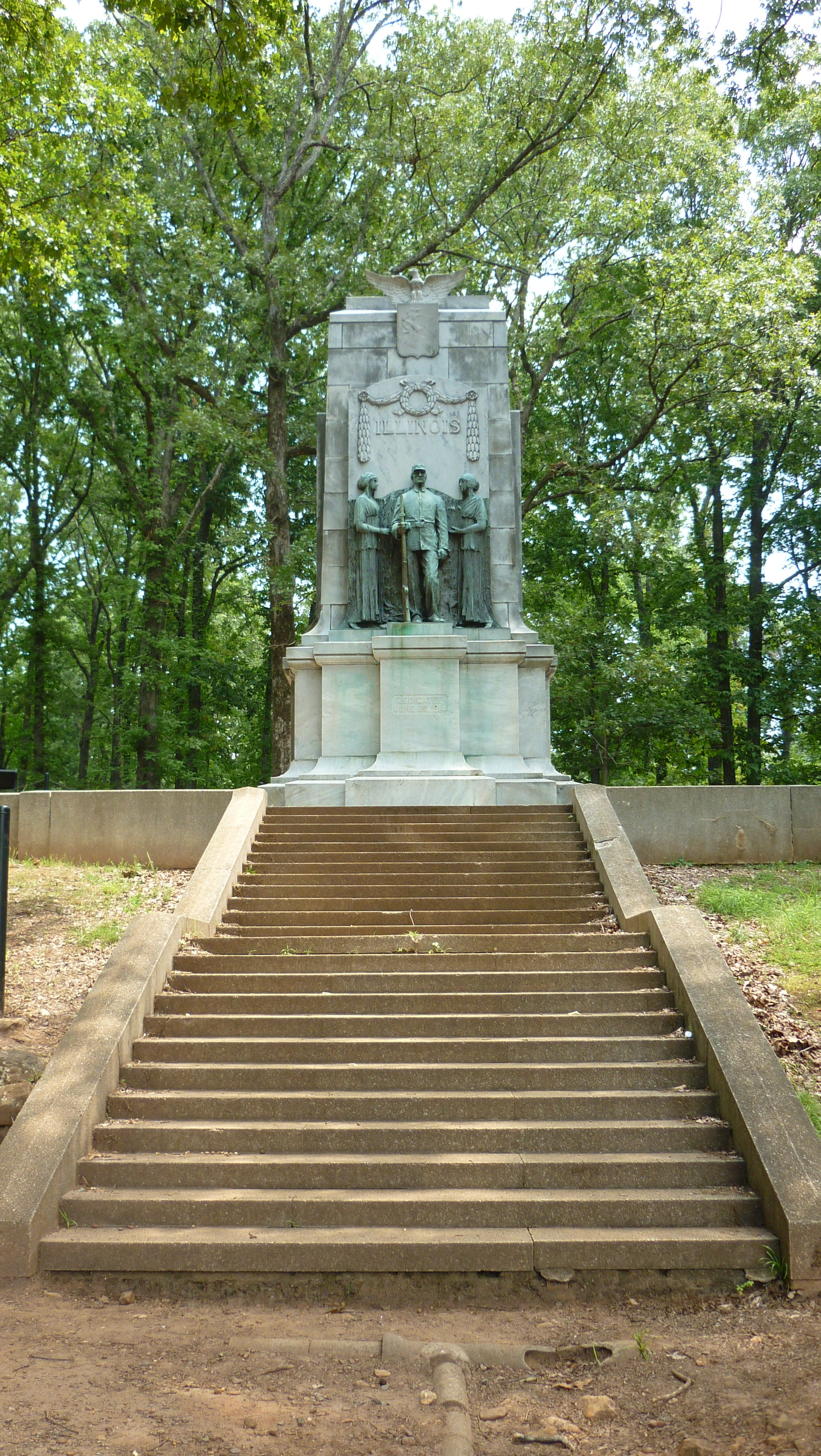
Illinois Monument at Cheatham Hill (The Dead Angle)

Kennesaw Mountain National Battlefield was authorized for protection by the U.S. War Department in 1917 and was transferred to the Department of the Interior as a unit of the National Park System in 1933. The 2,923-acre (11.8 km^{2}) battlefield includes the site of some of the heaviest fighting of the Atlanta Campaign of the Civil War. The battlefield was set aside as an important cultural property dedicated to public inspiration and interpretation of the significant historic events that occurred here.

With the expansion of urban sprawl from nearby Atlanta, Georgia, concerns have been raised that the preserved areas of the park may be in danger from overuse and/or misuse.
