= Battle of Stones River order of battle: Union =

The following Union Army units and commanders fought in the Battle of Stones River of the American Civil War. The Confederate order of battle is listed separately. Order of battle compiled from the army organization during the campaign, the casualty returns and the reports.

== Abbreviations ==
=== Military rank ===
- MG = Major General
- BG = Brigadier General
- Col = Colonel
- Ltc = Lieutenant Colonel
- Maj = Major
- Cpt = Captain
- Lt = Lieutenant
- Sgt = Sergeant

=== Other ===
- w = wounded
- mw = mortally wounded
- k = killed
- c = captured

== XIV Corps (Army of the Cumberland) ==
MG William S. Rosecrans, Commanding

=== General Staff and Headquarters ===
General Staff:

- Chief of Artillery and Ordnance: Col James Barnett
- Chief of Staff: Ltc Julius P. Garesché (k)
- Chief Quartermaster: Ltc John W. Taylor
- Chief Commissary: Ltc Samuel Simmons
- Judge-Advocate-General: Maj Ralston Skinner
- Inspector of Artillery: Cpt Jeremiah H. Gilman
- Assistant Inspector General: Cpt James Curtis
- Provost Marshal General: Cpt William M. Wiles
- Chief of Topographical Engineers: Cpt Nathaniel Michler
- Signal Corps: Cpt Jesse Merill

General Headquarters:

Provost Guard:

- 10th Ohio: Ltc Joseph W. Burke

General Escort:

- Anderson Troop, Pennsylvania Cavalry: Lt Thomas S. Maple

=== Right Wing ===
MG Alexander McD. McCook

Division	Brigade	Regiments and Others
First Division; BG Jefferson C. Davis	1st Brigade Col P. Sidney Post	59th Illinois: Cpt Hendrick E. Paine; 74th Illinois: Col Jason Marsh; 75th Illinois: Ltc John E. Bennett; 22nd Indiana: Col Michael Gooding
First Division; BG Jefferson C. Davis	2nd Brigade Col William P. Carlin	21st Illinois: Col John W. S. Alexander (w), Ltc Warren E. McMackin; 38th Illinois: Ltc Daniel H. Gilmer; 101st Ohio: Col Leander Stem (mw&c), Ltc Moses F. Wooster (mw&c), Maj Isaac M. Kirby, Cpt Bedan B. McDonald; 15th Wisconsin: Col Hans C. Heg
First Division; BG Jefferson C. Davis	3rd Brigade Col William E. Woodruff	25th Illinois: Col Thomas D. Williams (k), Cpt Wesford Taggart; 35th Illinois: Ltc William P. Chandler; 81st Indiana: Ltc John Timberlake
First Division; BG Jefferson C. Davis	Artillery	2nd Minnesota Battery: Cpt William A. Hotchkiss; 5th Wisconsin Battery: Cpt Oscar F. Pinney (mw), Lt Charles B. Humphrey; 8th Wisconsin Battery: Cpt Stephen J. Carpenter (k), Sgt Obadiah German, Lt Henry E. Stiles
First Division; BG Jefferson C. Davis	Escort	15th Illinois Cavalry, Company K: Cpt Samuel B. Sherer; 2nd Kentucky Cavalry, Company G: Cpt Miller R. McCulloch (k), Lt Harvey S. Park
Second Division; BG Richard W. Johnson	1st Brigade BG August Willich (w&c); Col William Wallace; Col William H. Gibson	89th Illinois: Ltc Charles T. Hotchkiss; 32nd Indiana: Ltc Francis Erdelmeyer; 39th Indiana: Ltc Fielder A. Jones; 15th Ohio: Col William Wallace, Cpt A. R. Z. Dawson, Col William Wallace; 49th Ohio: Col William H. Gibson, Ltc Levi Drake (k), Cpt Samuel F. Gray
Second Division; BG Richard W. Johnson	2nd Brigade BG Edward N. Kirk (mw); Col Joseph B. Dodge	34th Illinois: Ltc Hiram W. Bristol, Maj Alexander P. Dysart; 79th Illinois: Col Sheridan P. Read (k), Maj Allen Buckner; 29th Indiana: Ltc David M. Dunn (c), Maj Joseph P. Collins; 30th Indiana: Col Joseph B. Dodge, Ltc Orrin D. Hurd; 77th Pennsylvania: Ltc Peter B. Housum (k), Cpt Thomas E. Rose
Second Division; BG Richard W. Johnson	3rd Brigade Col Philemon P. Baldwin	6th Indiana: Ltc Hagerman Tripp; 5th Kentucky: Ltc William W. Berry (w); 1st Ohio: Maj Joab A. Stafford; 93rd Ohio: Col Charles Anderson (w)
Second Division; BG Richard W. Johnson	Artillery	5th Indiana Battery: Cpt Peter Simonson; 1st Ohio, Battery A: Lt Edmund B. Belding; 1st Ohio, Battery E: Cpt Warren P. Edgarton (c)
Second Division; BG Richard W. Johnson	Cavalry	3rd Indiana, Companies G, H, I, and K: Maj Robert Klein
Third Division; BG Philip Sheridan	1st Brigade BG Joshua W. Sill (k); Col Nicholas Greusel	36th Illinois: Col Nicholas Greusel, Maj Silas Miller (w&c), Cpt Porter C. Olson; 88th Illinois: Col Francis T. Sherman; 21st Michigan: Ltc William B. McCreery; 24th Wisconsin: Maj Elisha C. Hibbard
Third Division; BG Philip Sheridan	2nd Brigade Col Frederick Schaefer (k); Ltc Bernard Laiboldt	44th Illinois: Cpt Wallace W. Barrett (w); 73rd Illinois: Maj William A. Presson; 2nd Missouri: Ltc Bernard Laiboldt, Maj Francis Ehrler; 15th Missouri: Ltc John Weber
Third Division; BG Philip Sheridan	3rd Brigade Col George W. Roberts (k); Col Fazilo A. Harrington (k); Col Luther P. Bradley	22nd Illinois: Ltc Francis Swanwick (w&c), Cpt Samuel Johnson; 27th Illinois: Col Fazilo A. Harrington (k), Maj William A. Schmitt; 42nd Illinois: Ltc Nathan H. Walworth; 51st Illinois: Col Luther P. Bradley, Cpt Henry F. Wescott
Third Division; BG Philip Sheridan	Artillery Cpt Henry Hescock	1st Illinois, Battery C: Cpt Charles Houghtaling; 4th Indiana Battery: Cpt Asahel K. Bush; 1st Missouri, Battery G: Cpt Henry Hescock
Third Division; BG Philip Sheridan	Escort	2nd Kentucky Cavalry, Company L: Lt Joseph T. Forman

=== Center ===
MG George H. Thomas

- Provost Guard: 9th Michigan: Col John G. Parkhurst

Division	Brigade	Regiments and Others
First Division; MG Lovell Rousseau	1st Brigade Col Benjamin F. Scribner	38th Indiana: Ltc Daniel F. Griffin; 2nd Ohio: Ltc John Kell (k), Maj Anson G. McCook; 33rd Ohio: Cpt Ephraim J. Ellis; 94th Ohio: Col Joseph W. Frizell (w), Ltc Stephen A. Bassford; 10th Wisconsin: Col Alfred R. Chapin
First Division; MG Lovell Rousseau	2nd Brigade Col John Beatty	42nd Indiana: Ltc James M. Shanklin (c); 88th Indiana: Col George Humphrey (w), Ltc Cyrus E. Briant; 15th Kentucky: Col James B. Forman (k), Ltc Joseph R. Snider; 3rd Ohio: Ltc Orris A. Lawson
First Division; MG Lovell Rousseau	3rd Brigade Col John C. Starkweather	24th Illinois: Col Geza Mihalotzy; 79th Pennsylvania: Col Henry A. Hambright; 1st Wisconsin: Ltc George B. Bingham; 21st Wisconsin: Ltc Harrison C. Hobart
First Division; MG Lovell Rousseau	4th Brigade Ltc Oliver L. Shepherd	15th United States, 1st Battalion: Maj John H. King (w), Cpt Jesse Fulmer; 16th United States, 1st Battalion, and Company B, 2nd Battalion: Maj Adam J. Slemmer (w), Cpt R. E. A. Crofton; 18th United States, 1st Battalion, and Companies A and D, 3rd Battalion: Maj James N. Caldwell; 18th United States, 2nd Battalion, and Companies B, C, E, and F, 3rd Battalion: Maj Frederick Townsend; 19th United States, 1st Battalion: Maj Stephen D. Carpenter (k), Cpt James B. Mulligan
First Division; MG Lovell Rousseau	Artillery Cpt Cyrus O. Loomis	Kentucky, Battery A: Cpt David C. Stone; 1st Michigan, Battery A: Lt George W. Van Pelt; 5th United States, Battery H: Lt Francis L. Guenther
First Division; MG Lovell Rousseau	Cavalry	2nd Kentucky (6 companies): Maj Thomas P. Nicholas
Second Division; BG James S. Negley	1st Brigade BG James G. Spears	1st Tennessee: Col Robert K. Byrd; 2nd Tennessee: Ltc James M. Melton; 14th Michigan: Ltc Milton L. Phillips; 85th Illinois: Col Robert S. Moore; 10th Wisconsin Battery (2 sections): Cpt Yates V. Beebe
Second Division; BG James S. Negley	2nd Brigade Col Timothy R. Stanley	19th Illinois: Col Joseph R. Scott (w), Ltc Alexander W. Raffen; 11th Michigan: Col William L. Stoughton; 18th Ohio: Ltc Josiah Given; 69th Ohio: Col William B. Cassilly (w), Maj Eli J. Hickcox, Cpt David Putnam, Ltc George F. Elliott
Second Division; BG James S. Negley	3rd Brigade Col John F. Miller	37th Indiana: Col James S. Hull (w), Ltc William D. Ward; 21st Ohio: Ltc James M. Neibling; 74th Ohio: Col Granville Moody (w); 78th Pennsylvania: Col William Sirwell
Second Division; BG James S. Negley	Artillery	Kentucky, Battery B: Lt Alban A. Ellsworth; 1st Ohio, Battery G: Lt Alexander Marshall; 1st Ohio, Battery M: Cpt Frederick Schultz
Third Division; BG Speed S. Fry	1st Brigade Col Moses B. Walker	82nd Indiana: Col Morton C. Hunter; 17th Ohio: Col John M. Connell; 31st Ohio: Ltc Frederick W. Lister; 38th Ohio: Col Edward H. Phelps
Third Division; BG Speed S. Fry	Artillery	1st Michigan, Battery D: Cpt Josiah W. Church

=== Left Wing ===
MG Thomas L. Crittenden

- Chief of Artillery: Cpt John Mendenhall

Division	Brigade	Regiments and Others
First Division; BG Thomas J. Wood (w); BG Milo S. Hascall	1st Brigade BG Milo S. Hascall; Col George P. Buell	100th Illinois: Col Frederick A. Bartleson; 58th Indiana: Col George P. Buell, Ltc James T. Embree; 3rd Kentucky: Col Samuel McKee (k), Maj Daniel R. Collier; 26th Ohio: Cpt William H. Squires
First Division; BG Thomas J. Wood (w); BG Milo S. Hascall	2nd Brigade Col George D. Wagner	15th Indiana: Ltc Gustavus A. Wood; 40th Indiana: Col John W. Blake, Ltc Elias Neff (w), Maj Henry Leaming; 57th Indiana: Col Cyrus C. Hines (w), Ltc George W. Lennard (w), Cpt John S. McGraw; 97th Ohio: Col John Q. Lane
First Division; BG Thomas J. Wood (w); BG Milo S. Hascall	3rd Brigade Col Charles G. Harker	51st Indiana: Col Abel D. Streight; 73rd Indiana: Col Gilbert Hathaway; 13th Michigan: Col Michael Shoemaker; 64th Ohio: Ltc Alexander McIlvaine; 65th Ohio: Ltc Alexander Cassil (w), Maj Horatio N. Whitbeck (w)
First Division; BG Thomas J. Wood (w); BG Milo S. Hascall	Artillery Maj Seymour Race	8th Indiana Battery: Lt George Estep; 10th Indiana Battery: Cpt Jerome B. Cox; 6th Ohio Battery: Cpt Cullen Bradley
Second Division; BG John M. Palmer	1st Brigade BG Charles Cruft	31st Indiana: Col John Osborn; 1st Kentucky: Col David A. Enyart; 2nd Kentucky: Col Thomas D. Sedgewick; 90th Ohio: Col Isaac N. Ross
Second Division; BG John M. Palmer	2nd Brigade Col William B. Hazen	110th Illinois: Col Thomas S. Casey; 9th Indiana: Col William H. Blake; 6th Kentucky: Col Walter C. Whitaker; 41st Ohio: Ltc Aquila Wiley
Second Division; BG John M. Palmer	3rd Brigade Col William Grose	84th Illinois: Col Louis H. Waters; 36th Indiana: Maj Isaac Kinley (w), Cpt Pyrrhus Woodward; 23rd Kentucky: Maj Thomas H. Hamrick; 6th Ohio: Col Nicholas L. Anderson (w); 24th Ohio: Col Frederick C. Jones (k), Maj Henry Terry (k), Cpt Enoch Weller (k), Cpt A. T. M. Cockerill
Second Division; BG John M. Palmer	Artillery Cpt William E. Standart	1st Ohio, Battery B: Cpt William E Standart; 1st Ohio, Battery F: Cpt Daniel T. Cockerill (w), Lt Norval Osburn; 4th United States, Batteries H and M: Lt Charles C. Parsons
Third Division; BG Horatio P. Van Cleve (w); Col Samuel Beatty	1st Brigade Col Samuel Beatty; Col Benjamin C. Grider	79th Indiana: Col Frederick Knefler; 9th Kentucky: Col Benjamin C. Grider, Ltc George H. Cram; 11th Kentucky: Maj Erasmus L. Mottley; 19th Ohio: Col Charles F. Manderson
Third Division; BG Horatio P. Van Cleve (w); Col Samuel Beatty	2nd Brigade Col James P. Fyffe	44th Indiana: Col William C. Williams (c), Ltc Simeon C. Aldrich; 86th Indiana: Ltc George F. Dick; 13th Ohio: Col Joseph C. Hawkins (k), Maj Dwight Jarvis Jr.; 59th Ohio: Ltc William Howard
Third Division; BG Horatio P. Van Cleve (w); Col Samuel Beatty	3rd Brigade Col Samuel W. Price	35th Indiana: Col Bernard F. Mullen; 8th Kentucky: Ltc Reuben May, Maj Green B. Broaddus; 21st Kentucky: Ltc James C. Evans; 51st Ohio: Ltc Richard W. McClain; 99th Ohio: Col Peter T. Swaine (w), Ltc John E. Cummins
Third Division; BG Horatio P. Van Cleve (w); Col Samuel Beatty	Artillery Cpt George R. Swallow	7th Indiana Battery: Cpt George R. Swallow; Pennsylvania, Battery B: Lt Alanson J. Stevens; 3d Wisconsin Battery: Lt Cortland Livingston

=== Cavalry ===
BG David S. Stanley

Division	Brigade	Regiments and Others
Cavalry Division; Col John Kennett	1st Brigade Col Robert H.G. Minty	2nd Indiana, Company M: Cpt J.A.S. Mitchell; 3rd Kentucky: Col Eli H. Murray; 4th Michigan: Ltc William H. Dickinson; 7th Pennsylvania: Maj John E. Wynkoop
Cavalry Division; Col John Kennett	2nd Brigade Col Lewis Zahm	1st Ohio: Col Minor Millikin (k), Maj James Laughlin; 3rd Ohio: Ltc Douglas A. Murray; 4th Ohio: Maj John L. Pugh
Cavalry Division; Col John Kennett	Artillery	Battery D, 1st Ohio (1 section): Lt Nathaniel M. Newell
Reporting directly	Reserve Cavalry	15th Pennsylvania: Maj Adolph G. Rosengarten (k), Maj Frank B. Ward (mw), Cpt Alfred Vezin; 1st Middle (5th) Tennessee: Col William B. Stokes; 2nd Tennessee: Col Daniel M. Ray
Reporting directly	Unattached	4th United States: Cpt Elmer Otis

=== Engineers ===
Division	Brigade	Regiments and Others
Engineers	Pioneer Brigade Cpt James St. Clair Morton	1st Battalion: Cpt Lyman Bridges (w); 2nd Battalion: Cpt Calvin Hood; 3rd Battalion: Cpt Robert Clements; Chicago Board of Trade Battery: Cpt James H. Stokes
Engineers	Engineers and Mechanics	1st Michigan: Col William P. Innes
