= Battle of Chickamauga order of battle: Union =

The following Union Army units and commanders fought in the Battle of Chickamauga of the American Civil War. The Confederate order of battle is listed separately. Order of battle compiled from the army organization during the campaign.

== Abbreviations used ==
=== Military Rank ===
- MG = Major General
- BG = Brigadier General
- Col = Colonel
- Ltc = Lieutenant Colonel
- Maj = Major
- Cpt = Captain
- Lt = 1st Lieutenant

=== Other ===
- w = wounded
- mw = mortally wounded
- k = killed

== Army of the Cumberland ==
MG William Rosecrans, Commanding

General Staff
Chief of Staff: BG James A. Garfield

- Col James Barnett, Chief of Artillery
- Col William Truesdale
- Col John P. Sanderson, ADC
- Col Joseph C. McKibbin, ADC
- Ltc Calvin Goddard, Adjutant General
- Ltc Arthur C. Ducat, Inspector General
- Ltc Henry C. Hodges, Quartermaster General
- Ltc Samuel Simmons, Commissary of Subsistence
- Ltc William M. Wiles, Provost Marshal General
- Maj William M. McMichael, Adjutant General
- Maj Frank S. Bond, ADC
- Cpt Horace Porter, Chief of Ordnance
- Cpt Andrew S. Burt, Acting Inspector General
- Cpt Hunter Brooke, Acting Judge Advocate General
- Cpt William E. Merrill, Topographical Engineer
- Cpt William C. Margedant, Topographical Engineer
- Cpt Jesse Merrill, Signal Officer
- Cpt John C. Van Duzer, Telegraph
- Cpt R.S. Thomas, ADC
- Cpt James P. Drouillard, ADC
- Cpt Charles R. Thompson, ADC
- Cpt William Farrar, ADC
- Lt M.J. Kelly, Chief of Couriers
- Lt George Burroughs, Engineer
- Lt William L. Porter, Acting ADC
- Lt James K. Reynolds, Acting ADC
- Glover Perin, Surgeon
- Henry H. Seys, Surgeon
- D. Bache, Assistant Surgeon
- Jeremiah F. Trecy, Chaplain

General Headquarters

- 1st Battalion, Ohio Sharpshooters: Cpt Gershom M. Barber
- 10th Ohio Infantry: Ltc William M. Ward
- 15th Pennsylvania Cavalry: Col William J. Palmer

Pioneer Brigade
BG James St. Clair Morton, Chief Engineer (w)

- 1st Pioneer Battalion
- 2nd Pioneer Battalion
- 3rd Pioneer Battalion

=== XIV Corps ===
MG George Henry Thomas

Headquarters

Provost guard:

- 9th Michigan Infantry: Col John Gibson Parkhurst

Escort:

- 1st Ohio Cavalry, Company L: Cpt John D. Barker

Division	Brigade	Regiments and Others
First Division BG Absalom Baird	1st Brigade Col Benjamin F. Scribner	38th Indiana: Ltc Daniel F. Griffin; 2nd Ohio: Ltc Obadiah C. Maxwell (w), Maj William T. Beatty (w&c), Cpt James Warnock; 33rd Ohio: Col Oscar F. Moore; 94th Ohio: Maj Rue P. Hutchins; 10th Wisconsin: Ltc John H. Ely (mw&c), Cpt Jacob W. Roby
First Division BG Absalom Baird	2nd Brigade BG John C. Starkweather (w)	24th Illinois: Col Geza Mihalotzy (w), Cpt August Mauff; 79th Pennsylvania: Col Henry A. Hambright; 1st Wisconsin: Ltc George B. Bingham; 21st Wisconsin: Ltc Harrison C. Hobart (w), Cpt Charles H. Walker
First Division BG Absalom Baird	3rd Brigade BG John H. King	15th United States, 1st Battalion: Cpt Albert B. Dod; 16th United States, 1st Battalion: Maj Sidney Coolidge (k), Cpt Robert E.A. Crofton; 18th United States, 1st Battalion: Cpt George W. Smith; 18th United States, 2nd Battalion: Cpt Henry Haymond; 19th United States, 1st Battalion: Ltc Samuel K. Dawson (w), Cpt Edmund L. Smith
First Division BG Absalom Baird	Artillery	4th Battery, Indiana Light: Lt David Flansburg (w&c), Lt Henry J. Willits; Battery A, 1st Michigan Light: Lt George W. Van Pelt (k), Lt Almerick W. Wilbur; Battery H, 5th United States: Lt Howard Mather Burnham (mw), Lt Joshua A. Fessenden (w)
Second Division MG James S. Negley	1st Brigade BG John Beatty	104th Illinois: Ltc Douglas Hapeman; 42nd Indiana: Ltc William T. B. McIntire; 88th Indiana: Col George Humphrey; 15th Kentucky: Col Marion C. Taylor
Second Division MG James S. Negley	2nd Brigade Col Timothy R. Stanley (w); Col William L. Stoughton	19th Illinois: Ltc Alexander W. Raffen; 11th Michigan: Col William L. Stoughton, Ltc Melvin Mudge (w); 18th Ohio: Ltc Charles H. Grosvenor
Second Division MG James S. Negley	3rd Brigade Col William Sirwell	37th Indiana: Ltc William D. Ward; 21st Ohio: Ltc Dwella M. Stoughton (mw), Maj Arnold McMahan (w), Cpt Charles H. Vantine; 74th Ohio: Cpt Joseph Fisher; 78th Pennsylvania: Ltc Archibald Blakeley
Second Division MG James S. Negley	Artillery	Bridges' Battery, Illinois Light: Cpt Lyman Bridges; Battery G, 1st Ohio Light: Cpt Alexander Marshall; Battery M, 1st Ohio Light: Cpt Frederick Schultz
Third Division BG John Milton Brannan	1st Brigade Col John M. Connell	82nd Indiana: Col Morton C. Hunter; 17th Ohio: Ltc Durbin Ward (w); 31st Ohio: Ltc Frederick W. Lister; 38th Ohio: Col Edward H. Phelps
Third Division BG John Milton Brannan	2nd Brigade Col John T. Croxton (w); Col William H. Hays	10th Indiana: Col William B. Carroll (mw), Ltc Marsh B. Taylor; 74th Indiana: Col Charles W. Chapman; 4th Kentucky: Ltc P. Burgess Hunt (w), Maj Robert M. Kelly; 10th Kentucky: Col William H. Hays, Ltc Gabriel C. Wharton; 14th Ohio: Ltc Henry D. Kingsbury
Third Division BG John Milton Brannan	3rd Brigade Col Ferdinand Van Derveer	87th Indiana: Col Newell Gleason; 2nd Minnesota: Col James George; 9th Ohio: Col Gustave Kammerling; 35th Ohio: Ltc Henry Van Ness Boynton
Third Division BG John Milton Brannan	Artillery	Battery D, 1st Michigan Light: Cpt Josiah W. Church; Battery C, 1st Ohio Light: Lt Marco B. Gary; Battery I, 4th United States: Lt Frank G. Smith
Fourth Division MG Joseph J. Reynolds	1st Brigade Col John T. Wilder	92nd Illinois: Col Smith D. Atkins; 98th Illinois: Col John J. Funkhouser (w), Ltc Edward Kitchell; 123rd Illinois: Col James Monroe; 17th Indiana: Maj William T. Jones; 72nd Indiana: Col Abram O. Miller; 18th Battery, Indiana Light: Capt. Eli Lilly
Fourth Division MG Joseph J. Reynolds	2nd Brigade Col Edward A. King (k); Col Milton S. Robinson	68th Indiana: Cpt Harvey J. Espy (w); 75th Indiana: Col Milton S. Robinson, Ltc William O'Brien; 101st Indiana: Ltc Thomas Doan; 105th Ohio: Maj George T. Perkins (w)
Fourth Division MG Joseph J. Reynolds	3rd Brigade BG John B. Turchin	18th Kentucky: Ltc Hubbard K. Milward (w), Cpt John B. Heltemes; 11th Ohio: Col Philander P. Lane; 36th Ohio: Col William G. Jones (k), Ltc Hiram F. Devol; 92nd Ohio: Col Benjamin D. Fearing (w), Ltc Douglas Putnam, Jr. (w)
Fourth Division MG Joseph J. Reynolds	Artillery	19th Battery, Indiana Light: Cpt Samuel J. Harris (w), Lt Robert S. Lackey; 21st Battery, Indiana Light: Cpt William W. Andrew

=== XX Corps ===
MG Alexander McDowell McCook

Headquarters

Provost guard:
81st Indiana Infantry, Company H: Cpt William J. Richards

Escort:
2nd Kentucky Cavalry, Company I: Lt George W. L. Batman

Division	Brigade	Regiments and Others
First Division BG Jefferson C. Davis	1st Brigade Col P. Sidney Post	59th Illinois: Ltc Joshua C. Winters; 74th Illinois: Col Jason Marsh; 75th Illinois: Col John E. Bennett; 22nd Indiana: Col Michael Gooding; 5th Battery, Wisconsin Light Artillery: Cpt George Q. Gardner
First Division BG Jefferson C. Davis	2nd Brigade BG William P. Carlin	21st Illinois: Col John W. S. Alexander (k), Cpt Chester K. Knight; 38th Illinois: Ltc Daniel H. Gilmer (k), Cpt Willis G. Whitehurst; 81st Indiana: Cpt Nevil B. Boone, Maj James E. Calloway; 101st Ohio: Ltc John Messer (w), Maj Bedan B. McDonald (w), Cpt Leonard D. Smith; 2nd Battery, Minnesota Light Artillery: Lt Albert Woodbury (mw), Lt Richard L. Dawley
First Division BG Jefferson C. Davis	3rd Brigade Col Hans C. Heg (mw); Col John A. Martin	25th Illinois: Maj Samuel D. Wall (w), Cpt Wesford Taggart; 35th Illinois: Ltc William P. Chandler; 8th Kansas: Col John Alexander Martin, Ltc James L. Abernathy; 15th Wisconsin: Ltc Ole C. Johnson (c); 8th Battery, Wisconsin Light Artillery: Lt John D. McLean
Second Division BG Richard W. Johnson	1st Brigade BG August Willich	89th Illinois: Ltc Duncan J. Hall (k), Maj William D. Williams; 32nd Indiana: Ltc Francis Erdelmeyer; 39th Indiana: Col Thomas J. Harrison; 15th Ohio: Ltc Frank Askew; 49th Ohio: Maj Samuel F. Gray (w), Cpt Luther M. Strong; Battery A, 1st Ohio Light Artillery: Cpt Wilbur F. Goodspeed
Second Division BG Richard W. Johnson	2nd Brigade Col Joseph B. Dodge	79th Illinois: Col Allen Buckner; 29th Indiana: Ltc David M. Dunn; 30th Indiana: Ltc Orrin D. Hurd; 77th Pennsylvania: Col Thomas E. Rose (c), Cpt Joseph J. Lawson; 20th Battery, Ohio Light Artillery: Cpt John F. Edward Grosskopff
Second Division BG Richard W. Johnson	3rd Brigade Col Philemon P. Baldwin (k); Col William W. Berry	6th Indiana: Ltc Hagerman Tripp (w), Maj Calvin D. Campbell; 5th Kentucky: Col William W. Berry, Cpt John M. Huston; 1st Ohio: Ltc Bassett Langdon; 93rd Ohio: Col Hiram Strong (mw), Ltc William H. Martin; 5th Battery, Indiana Light Artillery: Cpt Peter Simonson
Third Division MG Philip Sheridan	1st Brigade BG William Haines Lytle (k); Col Silas Miller	36th Illinois: Col Silas Miller, Ltc Porter C. Olson; 88th Illinois: Ltc Alexander S. Chadbourne; 21st Michigan: Col William B. McCreery (w&c), Maj Seymour Chase; 24th Wisconsin: Ltc Theodore S. West (w&c), Maj Carl von Baumbach; 11th Battery, Indiana Light Artillery: Cpt Arnold Sutermeister
Third Division MG Philip Sheridan	2nd Brigade Col Bernard Laiboldt	44th Illinois: Col Wallace W. Barrett (w); 73rd Illinois: Col James F. Jaquess; 2nd Missouri: Maj Arnold Beck; 15th Missouri: Col Joseph Conrad; Battery G, 1st Missouri Light Artillery: Lt Gustavus Schueler
Third Division MG Philip Sheridan	3rd Brigade Col Luther Prentice Bradley (w); Col Nathan H. Walworth	22nd Illinois: Ltc Francis Swanwick; 27th Illinois: Col Jonathan R. Miles; 42nd Illinois: Col Nathan H. Walworth, Ltc John A. Hottenstein; 51st Illinois: Ltc Samuel B. Raymond; Battery C, 1st Illinois Light Artillery: Cpt Mark H. Prescott

=== XXI Corps ===
MG Thomas Leonidas Crittenden

Headquarters

Escort:
15th Illinois Cavalry, Company K: Cpt Samuel B. Sherer

Division	Brigade	Regiments and Others
First Division BG Thomas J. Wood	1st Brigade Col George P. Buell	100th Illinois: Col Frederick A. Bartleson (w&c), Maj Charles M. Hammond; 58th Indiana: Ltc James T. Embree; 13th Michigan: Col Joshua B. Culver (w), Maj Willard G. Eaton; 26th Ohio: Ltc William H. Young
First Division BG Thomas J. Wood	2nd Brigade BG George D. Wagner	15th Indiana: Col Gustavus A. Wood; 40th Indiana: Col John W. Blake; 57th Indiana: Ltc George W. Lennard; 97th Ohio: Ltc Milton Barnes
First Division BG Thomas J. Wood	3rd Brigade Col Charles G. Harker	3rd Kentucky: Col Henry C. Dunlap; 64th Ohio: Col Alexander McIlvaine; 65th Ohio: Ltc Horatio N. Whitbeck (w), Maj Samuel C. Brown (mw), Cpt Thomas Powell; 125th Ohio: Col Emerson Opdycke
First Division BG Thomas J. Wood	Artillery	8th Battery, Indiana Light: Cpt George Estep (w); 10th Battery, Indiana Light: Lt William A. Naylor; 6th Battery, Ohio Light: Cpt Cullen Bradley
Second Division MG John M. Palmer	1st Brigade BG Charles Cruft	31st Indiana: Col John T. Smith; 1st Kentucky: Ltc Alva R. Hadlock; 2nd Kentucky: Col Thomas D. Sedgewick; 90th Ohio: Col Charles H. Rippey
Second Division MG John M. Palmer	2nd Brigade BG William Babcock Hazen	9th Indiana: Col Isaac C. B. Suman; 6th Kentucky: Col George T. Shackelford (w), Ltc Richard Rockingham (k), Maj Richard T. Whitaker; 41st Ohio: Col Aquila Wiley; 124th Ohio: Col Oliver Hazard Payne (w), Maj James B. Hampson
Second Division MG John M. Palmer	3rd Brigade Col William Grose	84th Illinois: Col Louis H. Waters; 36th Indiana: Ltc Oliver H. P. Carey (w), Maj Gilbert Trusler; 23rd Kentucky: Ltc James C. Foy; 6th Ohio: Col Nicholas Longworth Anderson (w), Maj Samuel C. Erwin; 24th Ohio: Col David J. Higgins
Second Division MG John M. Palmer	Artillery Cpt William E. Standart	Battery B, 1st Ohio Light: Lt Norman A. Baldwin; Battery F, 1st Ohio Light: Lt Giles J. Cockerill; Battery H, 4th United States: Lt Harry C. Cushing; Battery M, 4th United States: Lt Francis L. D. Russell
Second Division MG John M. Palmer	Unattached	110th Illinois (battalion): Ltc Ebenezer Hibbard Topping
Third Division BG Horatio P. Van Cleve	1st Brigade BG Samuel Beatty	79th Indiana: Col Frederick Knefler; 9th Kentucky: Col George H. Cram; 17th Kentucky: Col Alexander M. Stout; 19th Ohio: Ltc Henry G. Stratton
Third Division BG Horatio P. Van Cleve	2nd Brigade Col George F. Dick	44th Indiana: Ltc Simeon C. Aldrich; 86th Indiana: Maj Jacob C. Dick; 13th Ohio: Ltc Elhannon M. Mast (k), Cpt Horatio G. Cosgrove; 59th Ohio: Ltc Granville A. Frambes
Third Division BG Horatio P. Van Cleve	3rd Brigade Col Sidney M. Barnes	35th Indiana: Maj John P. Dufficy; 8th Kentucky: Ltc James D. Mayhew (c), Maj John S. Clark; 21st Kentucky: Col Samuel Woodson Price; 51st Ohio: Col Richard W. McClain (c), Ltc Charles H. Wood; 99th Ohio: Col Peter T. Swaine
Third Division BG Horatio P. Van Cleve	Artillery	7th Battery, Indiana Light: Cpt George R. Swallow; Battery B, Pennsylvania Light Artillery: Cpt Alanson J. Stevens (k), Lt Samuel M. McDowell; 3d Battery, Wisconsin Light: Lt Cortland Livingston

=== Reserve Corps ===
MG Gordon Granger

Division	Brigade	Regiments and Others
First division BG James B. Steedman	1st Brigade BG Walter C. Whitaker	96th Illinois: Col Thomas E. Champion; 115th Illinois: Col Jesse Hale Moore; 84th Indiana: Col Nelson Trusler; 22nd Michigan: Col Heber Le Favour (c), Ltc William Sanborn (w), Cpt Alonzo M. Keeler (c); 40th Ohio: Ltc William Jones; 89th Ohio: Col Caleb H. Carlton (c), Cpt Isaac C. Nelson; 18th Battery, Ohio Light Artillery: Cpt Charles C. Aleshire
First division BG James B. Steedman	2nd Brigade Col John G. Mitchell	78th Illinois: Ltc Carter Van Vleck (w), Lt George Green; 98th Ohio: Cpt Moses J. Urquhart (w), Cpt Armstrong J. Thomas; 113th Ohio: Ltc Darius B. Warner; 121st Ohio: Ltc Henry B. Banning; Battery M, 1st Illinois Light Artillery: Lt Thomas Burton
Second Division --	2nd Brigade Col Daniel McCook, Jr.	85th Illinois: Col Caleb J. Dilworth; 86th Illinois: Ltc David W. Magee; 125th Illinois: Col Oscar F. Harmon; 52nd Ohio: Maj James T. Holmes; 69th Ohio: Ltc Joseph H. Brigham; Battery I, 2nd Illinois Light Artillery: Cpt Charles M. Barnett

=== Cavalry Corps ===
BG Robert B. Mitchell

Division	Brigade	Regiments and Others
First Division Col Edward M. McCook	1st Brigade Col Archibald P. Campbell	2nd Michigan Cavalry: Maj Leonidas S. Scranton; 9th Pennsylvania Cavalry: Ltc Roswell M. Russell; 1st Tennessee Cavalry: Ltc James P. Brownlow
First Division Col Edward M. McCook	2nd Brigade Col Daniel M. Ray	2nd Indiana Cavalry: Maj Joseph B. Presdee; 4th Indiana Cavalry: Ltc John T. Deweese; 2nd Tennessee Cavalry: Ltc William R. Cook; 1st Wisconsin Cavalry: Col Oscar H. LaGrange; Battery D, 1st Ohio Light Artillery (1 section): Lt Nathaniel M. Newell
First Division Col Edward M. McCook	3rd Brigade Col Louis D. Watkins	4th Kentucky Cavalry: Col Wickliffe Cooper; 5th Kentucky Cavalry: Ltc William T. Hoblitzell; 6th Kentucky Cavalry: Maj Louis A. Gratz
Second Division BG George Crook	1st Brigade Col Robert H. G. Minty	3rd Indiana Cavalry (detachment): Ltc Robert Klein; 4th Michigan Cavalry: Maj Horace Gray; 7th Pennsylvania Cavalry: Ltc James J. Seibert; 4th United States Cavalry: Cpt James B. Mcintyre
Second Division BG George Crook	2nd Brigade Col Eli Long	2nd Kentucky Cavalry: Col Thomas P. Nicholas; 1st Ohio Cavalry: Ltc Valentine Cupp (mw), Maj Thomas J. Patten; 3rd Ohio Cavalry: Ltc Charles B. Seidel; 4th Ohio Cavalry: Ltc Oliver P. Robie
Second Division BG George Crook	Artillery	Chicago (Illinois) Board of Trade Battery: Cpt James H. Stokes
