= Battle of Chickamauga order of battle =

The order of battle for the Battle of Chickamauga includes:

- Battle of Chickamauga order of battle: Confederate
- Battle of Chickamauga order of battle: Union
