= Battle of Murfreesboro order of battle =

Battle of Murfreesboro order of battle may refer to:

- First Battle of Murfreesboro order of battle
- Battle of Stones River order of battle, or the Second Battle of Murfreesboro order of battle
