= 40th Indiana Infantry Regiment =

40th Regiment Indiana Infantry
- Active: December 30, 1861 – December 21, 1865
- Country: United States
- Allegiance: Union
- Branch: Infantry
- Engagements: Battle of Shiloh; Siege of Corinth; Battle of Perryville; Battle of Stones River; Tullahoma Campaign; Battle of Chickamauga; Chattanooga campaign; Battle of Missionary Ridge; Atlanta campaign; Battle of Resaca; Battle of Kennesaw Mountain; Siege of Atlanta; Battle of Jonesboro; Battle of Spring Hill; Second Battle of Franklin; Battle of Nashville

The 40th Regiment Indiana Infantry was an infantry regiment that served in the Union Army during the American Civil War.

== Service ==
The 40th Indiana Infantry was organized at Lafayette and Indianapolis, Indiana and mustered in for a three-year enlistment on December 30, 1861, under the command of Colonel William C. Wilson.

The regiment was attached to 21st Brigade, Army of the Ohio, January 1862. 21st Brigade, 6th Division, Army of the Ohio, to September 1862. 21st Brigade, 6th Division, II Corps, Army of the Ohio, to November 1862. 2nd Brigade, 1st Division, Left Wing, XIV Corps, Army of the Cumberland, to January 1863. 2nd Brigade, 1st Division, XXI Corps, Army of the Cumberland, to October 1863. 2nd Brigade, 2nd Division, IV Corps, Army of the Cumberland, to June 1865, 1st Brigade, 2nd Division, IV Corps, to August 1865. Department of Texas, to December 1865.

The 40th Indiana Infantry mustered out of service on December 21, 1865.

== Detailed service ==
- Ordered to Kentucky and duty at Bardstown, Kentucky, until February 1862. March to Bowling Green, Kentucky, and Nashville, Tennessee, February 10 - March 13, 1862, and to Savannah, Tennessee, March 29 - April 6.
- Battle of Shiloh, April 6–7. Advance on and siege of Corinth, Mississippi, April 29 - May 30. Pursuit to Booneville May 31-June 12. Buell's Campaign in northern Alabama and middle Tennessee June to August. March to Louisville, Kentucky, in pursuit of Bragg August 21-September 26. Pursuit of Bragg to London, Kentucky, October 1–22.
- Battle of Perryville, October 8. March to Nashville, Tennessee, October 22-November 7, and duty there until December 26.
- Advance on Murfreesboro December 26–30. Lavergne December 26–27.
- Battle of Stones River December 30–31, 1862 and January 1–3, 1863.
- Duty at Murfreesboro until June. Reconnaissance to Nolensville and Versailles January 13–15. Tullahoma Campaign June 23-July 7.
- Occupation of middle Tennessee until August 16. March over Cumberland Mountains to Chattanooga, Tennessee, August 16-September 9.
- Occupation of Chattanooga September 9 and garrison duty there during Chickamauga Campaign.
- Siege of Chattanooga September 24-November 23. Chattanooga-Ringgold Campaign November 23–27. Orchard Knob November 23–24. Missionary Ridge November 25.
- Pursuit to Graysville November 26–27. March to relief of Knoxville November 28-December 8.
- Operations in eastern Tennessee December 1863 to April 1864. Operations about Dandridge January 16–17. Atlanta Campaign May 1 to September 8. Demonstrations on Rocky Faced Ridge and Dalton May 8–13. Buzzard's Roost Gap May 8–9.
- Battle of Resaca May 14–15. Adairsville May 17. Near Kingston May 18–19. Near Cassville May 19. Advance on Dallas May 22–25.
- Operations on line of Pumpkin Vine Creek and battles about Dallas, New Hope Church, and Allatoona Hills May 25 - June 5.
- Operations about Marietta and against Kennesaw Mountain June 10 - July 2. Pine Hill June 11–14. Lost Mountain June 15–17. Assault on Kennesaw June 27. Ruff's Station, Smyrna Camp Ground, July 4. Chattahoochee River July 5–17. Buckhead, Nancy's Creek, July 18. Peachtree Creek July 19–20. Siege of Atlanta July 22 - August 25. Flank movement on Jonesboro August 25–30.
- Battle of Jonesboro August 31-September 1. Operations against Hood in northern Georgia and northern Alabama September 29-November 3. Nashville Campaign November–December. Columbia, Duck River, November 24–27. Spring Hill November 29. Battle of Franklin November 30. Battle of Nashville December 15–16.
- Pursuit of Hood to the Tennessee River December 17–28. Moved to Huntsville, Alabama, and duty there until March 1865. Operations in eastern Tennessee March 15 - April 22. At Nashville until June.
- Ordered to New Orleans, Louisiana, June 16, then to Texas, July.
- Duty at Green Lake and San Antonio and at Port Lavacca until December.

== Casualties ==
The regiment lost a total of 359 men during service; 5 officers and 143 enlisted men killed or mortally wounded, 5 officers and 206 enlisted men died of disease.

== Commanders ==
- Colonel William C. Wilson - resigned March 27, 1862
- Colonel John W. Blake - honorably discharged March 1865
- Colonel Henry Leaming - mustered out with the regiment; commanded at the battle of Stones River as major and at the battle of Nashville as lieutenant colonel
- Lieutenant Colonel Elias Neff - commanded at the battle of Stones River

== See also ==
- List of Indiana Civil War regiments
- Indiana in the Civil War
