= 5th Independent Battery Indiana Light Artillery =

- Active: November 22, 1861 – November 26, 1864
- Country: United States
- Allegiance: Union
- Branch: Artillery
- Equipment: 2 3" Parrott rifles, 4 12-pdr M1857 Napoleons
- Engagements: Battle of Perryville; Battle of Stones River; Tullahoma Campaign; Battle of Chickamauga; Siege of Chattanooga; Atlanta campaign Battle of Resaca; Battle of Kennesaw Mountain; Battle of Peachtree Creek; Siege of Atlanta; Battle of Jonesboro

5th Indiana Battery Light Artillery was an artillery battery that served in the Union Army during the American Civil War. It was often referred to as Simonson's Battery.

== Service ==
The battery was organized at Indianapolis, Indiana and mustered in for a three-year enlistment on November 22, 1861. It was mustered in under the command of Captain Peter Simonson.

The battery was attached to 3rd Division, Army of the Ohio, to September 1862. 9th Brigade, 3rd Division, I Corps, Army of the Ohio, to November 1862. 3rd Brigade, 2nd Division, Right Wing, XIV Corps, Army of the Cumberland, to January 1863. Artillery, 2nd Division, XX Corps, Army of the Cumberland, to October 1863. Artillery, 1st Division, IV Corps, Army of the Cumberland, to July 1864. Artillery Brigade, IV Corps, to September 1864. Garrison Artillery, Chattanooga, Tennessee, Department of the Cumberland, to November 1864.

The 5th Indiana Battery Light Artillery mustered out of service on November 26, 1864.

== Detailed service ==
Left Indiana for Louisville, Kentucky, November 27. Duty at Camp Gilbert, Louisville, until December 20, 1861, and at Bacon Creek, Kentucky, until February 1862. Advance on Bowling Green, Kentucky, and Nashville, Tennessee, February 10–25. Occupation of Bowling Green, February 15, and of Nashville February 25. Moved to Murfreesboro, Tennessee, March 18. Reconnaissance to Shelbyville, Tullahoma, and McMinnville March 25–28. Advance on Fayetteville and Huntsville, Alabama, April 7–11. Capture of Huntsville April 11. Advance on and capture of Decatur April 11–14. Duty at Bridgeport, Ala. (detachment), and along Nashville & Chattanooga R. R. until August. Moved to Stevenson, Alabama, August 24. Moved to Nashville, Tennessee; then to Louisville, Kentucky, in pursuit of Bragg, August 31-September 26. Pursuit of Bragg into Kentucky October 1–15. Battle of Perryville, October 8. March to Nashville, Tennessee, October 20-November 9, and duty there until December 26. Advance on Murfreesboro, Tenn., December 26–30. Battle of Stones River December 30–31, 1862, and January 1–3, 1863. Duty at Murfreesboro until June. Tullahoma Campaign June 22-July 7. Liberty Gap June 22–24. Occupation of middle Tennessee until August 16. Passage of the Cumberland Mountains and Tennessee River and Chickamauga Campaign August 16-September 22. Battle of Chickamauga September 19–20. Siege of Chattanooga, Tennessee, September 24-October 26. Reopening Tennessee River October 26–29. Outpost duty at Shellmound until February 1864. Demonstrations on Dalton February 22–27. Tunnel Hill, Buzzard's Roost Gap and Rocky Faced Ridge February 23–25. Stone Church, near Catoosa Platform, February 27. Atlanta Campaign May 1 to September 8. Tunnel Hill May 6–7. Demonstration on Rocky Faced Ridge and Dalton May 8–13. Buzzard's Roost Gap May 8–9. Near Dalton May 13. Battle of Resaca May 14–15. Near Kingston May 18–19. Near Cassville May 19. Advance on Dallas May 22–25, Operations on line of Pumpkin Vine Creek and battles about Dallas, New Hope Church, and Allatoona Hills May 25-June 5. Operations about Marietta and against Kennesaw Mountain June 10-July 2. Pine Hill June 11–14. Lost Mountain June 15–17. Assault on Kennesaw June 27. Ruff's Station July 4. Chattahoochie River July 5–17. Peachtree Creek July 19–20. Siege of Atlanta July 22-August 25. Flank movement on Jonesboro August 25–30. Battle of Jonesboro August 31-September 1. Lovejoy's Station September 2–6. Ordered to Chattanooga, Tennessee, September 20. Veterans and recruits transferred to 7th Indiana Battery Light Artillery.

== Death of Polk ==
At Pine Mountain, Georgia, the battery was ordered to fire on a cluster of Confederate officers in an exposed area spotted by Major General William T. Sherman. The officers were Generals Leonidas Polk, William J. Hardee, Joseph E. Johnston and their staffs. Sherman pointed them out to Maj. Gen. Oliver O. Howard, commander of the IV Corps, and ordered him to fire on them. Captain Simonson obeyed the order within minutes. The first round came close and a second even closer, causing the men to disperse. A third shell struck Polk's left arm, went through the chest, and exited hitting his right arm then exploded against a tree; nearly cutting Polk in two.

== Casualties ==
The battery lost a total of 36 men during service; 1 officer and 11 enlisted men killed or mortally wounded, 24 enlisted men died of disease.

== Commanders ==
- Captain Peter Simonson - killed by a sniper, June 16, 1864, while serving as Acting Chief of Artillery, 1st Division, IV Corps
- Lieutenant Daniel H. Chandler

== See also ==
- List of Indiana Civil War regiments
- Indiana in the Civil War
