= Battle of Stones River order of battle =

The order of battle for the Battle of Stones River (also known as the Battle of Murfreesboro, or technically, the Second Battle of Murfreesboro) includes:

- Battle of Stones River order of battle: Confederate
- Battle of Stones River order of battle: Union

== See also ==
- First Battle of Murfreesboro order of battle
