= 86th Indiana Infantry Regiment =

86th Regiment Indiana Infantry
- Active: September 4, 1862 – June 6, 1865
- Country: United States
- Allegiance: Union
- Branch: Infantry
- Engagements: Defense of Cincinnati; Battle of Perryville; Battle of Stones River; Tullahoma Campaign; Battle of Chickamauga; Siege of Chattanooga; Battle of Missionary Ridge; Atlanta campaign Battle of Resaca; Battle of Kennesaw Mountain; Siege of Atlanta; Battle of Jonesboro; Second Battle of Franklin; Battle of Nashville

The 86th Regiment Indiana Infantry was an infantry regiment that served in the Union Army during the American Civil War.

== Service ==
The 86th Indiana Infantry was organized at Lafayette, Indiana and mustered in for a three-year enlistment on September 4, 1862, under the command of Colonel Orville S. Hamilton.

The regiment was attached to 14th Brigade, 5th Division, Army of the Ohio, September 1862. 14th Brigade, 5th Division, II Corps, Army of the Ohio, to November 1862. 2nd Brigade, 3rd Division, Left Wing, XIV Corps, Army of the Cumberland, to January 1863. 2nd Brigade, 3rd Division, XXI Corps, Army of the Cumberland, to October 1863. 3rd Brigade, 3rd Division, IV Corps, Army of the Cumberland, to June 1865.

The 86th Indiana Infantry mustered out of service on June 6, 1865.

== Detailed service ==
Ordered to Cincinnati, Ohio, September 5, then to Covington, Kentucky, and to Louisville, Kentucky, September 30. Duty there until October 1. Pursuit of Bragg to London, Kentucky, October 1–22, 1862. Battle of Perryville, October 8 (reserve). March to Nashville, Tennessee, October 22-November 7, and duty there until December 26. Advance on Murfreesboro December 26–30. Battle of Stones River December 30–31, 1862 and January 1–3, 1863. Duty at Murfreesboro until June. Tullahoma Campaign June 23-July 7. Occupation of middle Tennessee until August 16. Passage of the Cumberland Mountains and Tennessee River and Chickamauga Campaign August 16-September 22. Battle of Chickamauga September 19–20. Siege of Chattanooga September 24-November 23. Chattanooga-Ringgold Campaign November 23–27. Orchard Knob November 23–24. Missionary Ridge November 25. Pursuit to Graysville November 26–27. March to relief of Knoxville November 28-December 8. Operations in eastern Tennessee December 1863 to April 1864. Atlanta Campaign May 1 to September 8. Demonstrations on Rocky Faced Ridge and Dalton May 8–13. Battle of Resaca May 14–15. Adairsville May 17. Near Kingston May 18–19. Near Cassville May 19. Cassville May 24. Operations on line of Pumpkin Vine Creek and battles about Dallas, New Hope Church, and Allatoona Hills May 25-June 5. Pickett's Mills May 27. Operations about Marietta and against Kennesaw Mountain June 10-July 2. Pine Hill June 11–14. Lost Mountain June 15–17. Assault on Kennesaw June 27. Ruff's or Neal Dow Station, Smyrna Camp Ground, July 4. Chattahoochie River July 5–17. Peachtree Creek July 19–20. Siege of Atlanta July 22-August 25. Flank movement on Jonesboro August 25–30. Battle of Jonesboro August 31-September 1. Lovejoy's Station September 2–6. Operations against Hood in northern Georgia and northern Alabama September 29-November 3. Nashville Campaign November–December. Columbia, Duck River, November 24–27. Columbia Ford November 29. Battle of Franklin November 30. Battle of Nashville December 15–16. Pursuit of Hood to the Tennessee River December 17–28. Moved to Huntsville, Alabama, and duty there until March 1865. Expedition from Whitesburg February 17, 1865. Operations in eastern Tennessee March 15-April 22. At Nashville until June.

== Casualties ==
The regiment lost a total of 249 men during service; 2 officers and 70 enlisted men killed or mortally wounded, 1 officer and 176 enlisted men died of disease.

== Commanders ==
- Colonel Orville S. Hamilton
- Colonel George Frederick Dick - commanded at the battle of Stones River as lieutenant colonel
- Major Jacob C. Dick - commanded at the battle of Chickamauga

== See also ==
- List of Indiana Civil War regiments
- Indiana in the Civil War
