= 57th Indiana Infantry Regiment =

57th Regiment Indiana Infantry
- Active: November 18, 1861 – December 14, 1865
- Country: United States
- Allegiance: Union
- Branch: Infantry
- Engagements: Battle of Shiloh; Siege of Corinth; Battle of Perryville; Battle of Stones River; Tullahoma Campaign; Siege of Chattanooga; Battle of Missionary Ridge; Atlanta campaign Battle of Resaca; Battle of Kennesaw Mountain; Siege of Atlanta; Battle of Jonesboro; Battle of Spring Hill; Second Battle of Franklin; Battle of Nashville

The 57th Regiment Indiana Infantry was an infantry regiment that served in the Union Army during the American Civil War.

== Service ==
The 57th Indiana Infantry was organized at Richmond, Indiana and mustered in for a three-year enlistment on November 18, 1861, under the command of Colonel John W. T. McMullen.

The regiment was attached to 21st Brigade, Army of the Ohio, January 1862. 21st Brigade, 6th Division, Army of the Ohio, to September 1862. 21st Brigade, 6th Division, II Corps, Army of the Ohio, to November 1862. 2nd Brigade, 1st Division, Left Wing, XIV Corps, Army of the Cumberland, to January 1863. 2nd Brigade, 1st Division, XXI Corps, Army of the Cumberland, to October 1863. 2nd Brigade, 2nd Division, IV Corps, Army of the Cumberland, to June 1865. 1st Brigade, 2nd Division, IV Corps, to August 1865. Department of Texas to December 1865.

The 57th Indiana Infantry mustered out of service at San Antonio, Texas on December 14, 1865.

== Detailed service ==
At Indianapolis until December 23. Left Indiana for Kentucky December 23 and duty at Bardstown and Lebanon, Kentucky, until February 1862. March through central Kentucky to Nashville, Tennessee, February 10-March 13, 1862. March to Savannah, Tennessee, March 21-April 6. Battle of Shiloh, April 6–7. Advance on and siege of Corinth, Mississippi, April 29-May 30. Pursuit to Booneville May 31-June 6. Buell's Campaign in northern Alabama and middle Tennessee, along Memphis & Charleston Railroad June to August. March to Louisville, Kentucky, in pursuit of Bragg August 21-September 26. Pursuit of Bragg to London, Kentucky, October 1–22. Battle of Perryville, October 8. March to Nashville, Tennessee, October 22-November 7, and duty there until December 26. Near Nashville December 11. Advance on Murfreesboro December 26–30. Battle of Stones River December 30–31, 1862 and January 1–3, 1863. Duty at Murfreesboro until June. Reconnaissance to Nolensville and Versailles January 13–15. Tullahoma Campaign June 23-July 7. Camp near Pelham until August 17. Passage of the Cumberland Mountains and Tennessee River and Chickamauga Campaign August 17-September 22. Occupation of Chattanooga, September 9, and garrison duty there during Chickamauga Campaign. Siege of Chattanooga, September 22-November 23. Chattanooga-Ringgold Campaign November 23–27. Orchard Knob November 23–24. Missionary Ridge November 25. Pursuit to Graysville November 26–27. March to relief of Knoxville November 28-December 8. Operations in eastern Tennessee until April 1864. Operations about Dandridge January 16–17. Atlanta Campaign May 1 to September 8. Demonstrations on Rocky Faced Ridge and Dalton May 8–13. Buzzard's Roost Gap May 8–9. Battle of Resaca May 14–15. Adairsville May 17. Near Kingston May 18–19. Near Cassville May 19. Advance on Dallas May 22–25. Operations on line of Pumpkin Vine Creek and battles about Dallas, New Hope Church, and Allatoona Hills May 25-June 5. Operations about Marietta and against Kennesaw Mountain June 10-July 2. Pine Hill June 10–14. Lost Mountain June 15–17. Assault on Kennesaw June 27. Ruff's Station, Smyrna Camp Ground, July 4. Chattahoochie River July 5–17. Buckhead, Nancy's Creek, July 18. Peach Tree Creek July 19–20. Siege of Atlanta July 22-August 25. Flank movement on Jonesboro August 25–30. Battle of Jonesboro August 31-September 1. Lovejoy's Station September 2–6. Operations against Hood in northern Georgia and northern Alabama September 29-November 3. Nashville Campaign November–December. Columbia, Duck River, November 24–27. Spring Hill November 29. Battle of Franklin November 30. Battle of Nashville December 15–16. Pursuit of Hood to the Tennessee River December 17–28. Moved to Huntsville, Alabama, and duty there until March 1865. Operations in eastern Tennessee March 15-April 22. At Nashville until June. Ordered to New Orleans, Louisiana, June 16; then to Texas July. Duty at Green Lake and San Antonio until December.

== Casualties ==
The regiment lost a total of 275 men during service; 6 officers and 97 enlisted men killed or mortally wounded, 2 officers and 170 enlisted men died of disease.

== Commanders ==
- Colonel John W. T. McMullen
- Colonel Cyrus C. Hines
- Colonel George W. Lennard - commanded at the battles of Stones River and Chickamauga at the rank of lieutenant colonel; mortally wounded at the Battle of Resaca
- Colonel Willis Blanch - commanded at the battle of Nashville at the rank of lieutenant colonel
- Colonel John S. McGraw - commanded at the battle of Stones River as captain; commanded at the battle of Nashville at the rank of major

== See also ==
- List of Indiana Civil War regiments
- Indiana in the Civil War
