= 8th Independent Battery Indiana Light Artillery =

- Active: December 13, 1861 – March 13, 1865
- Country: United States
- Allegiance: Union
- Branch: Artillery
- Engagements: Battle of Shiloh; Siege of Corinth; Battle of Perryville; Battle of Stones River; Tullahoma Campaign; Battle of Chickamauga; Siege of Chattanooga

8th Indiana Battery Light Artillery was an artillery battery that served in the Union Army during the American Civil War.

== Service ==
The battery was organized at Indianapolis, Indiana and mustered in for a three-year enlistment on December 13, 1861.

The battery was attached to Artillery, 4th Division, Army of the Ohio, to March 1862. Artillery, 6th Division, Army of the Ohio, to September 1862. 15th Brigade, 6th Division, II Corps, Army of the Ohio, to November 1862. 1st Brigade, 1st Division, Left Wing, XIV Corps, Army of the Cumberland, to January 1863. Artillery, 1st Division, XXI Corps, Army of the Cumberland, to October 1863. 2nd Division, Artillery Reserve, Department of the Cumberland, to November 1863. Garrison Artillery, Chattanooga, Tennessee, to January 1865.

Non-veterans mustered out of the battery on January 25, 1865. Veterans and recruits continued to serve in the 8th Indiana Battery Light Artillery until it ceased to exist on March 13, 1865, when consolidated with the 7th Independent Battery Indiana Light Artillery.

== Detailed service ==
Left Indiana for Louisville, Kentucky, January 24, 1862. Movement to Nashville, Tennessee, February 10–25, 1862. Occupation of Nashville February 25 to March 17. March to Savannah, Tennessee, March 17-April 6. Battle of Shiloh, April 7 (reserve). Advance on and siege of Corinth, Mississippi, April 29-May 30. Pursuit to Booneville May 31-June 12. Buell's Campaign in northern Alabama and middle Tennessee June to August. Action at Little Pond, near McMinnville, August 30. March to Louisville, Kentucky, in pursuit of Bragg August 30-September 26. Pursuit of Bragg to London, Kentucky, October 1–22. Battle of Perryville, October 8 (reserve). Nelson's Cross Roads October 18. March to Nashville, Tennessee, October 22-November 7, and duty there until December 26. Murfreesboro Pike November 9. Advance on Murfreesboro December 26–30. Lavergne December 26–27. Battle of Stones River December 30–31, 1862 and January 1–3, 1863. Duty at Murfreesboro until June. Tullahoma Campaign June 23-July 7. Occupation of middle Tennessee until August 16. Passage of the Cumberland Mountains and Tennessee River and Chickamauga Campaign August 16-September 22. Lee and Gordon's Mills September 11–13 and September 17–18. Battle of Chickamauga September 19–20. Siege of Chattanooga, Tennessee, September 24-November 23. Chattanooga-Ringgold Campaign November 23–27. Duty at Chattanooga until March, 1865. (A detachment served at Resaca, Georgia, until November 1864, participating in the repulse of Hood's attack on Resaca October 12. Rejoined the battery at Chattanooga November 1864.)

== Casualties ==
The battery lost a total of 15 men during service; 5 enlisted men killed or mortally wounded, 10 enlisted men died of disease.

== Commanders ==
- Captain George Estep - commanded at the battles of Perryville and Stones River as lieutenant

== See also ==
- List of Indiana Civil War regiments
- Indiana in the Civil War
