= Battery F, 1st Ohio Light Artillery =

- Active: August 1861 to July 22, 1865
- Country: United States
- Allegiance: Union
- Branch: Artillery
- Engagements: Battle of Shiloh; Siege of Corinth; Battle of Perryville; Battle of Stones River; Tullahoma Campaign; Battle of Chickamauga; Siege of Chattanooga; Battle of Lookout Mountain; Battle of Missionary Ridge

Battery F, 1st Ohio Light Artillery was an artillery battery that served in the Union Army during the American Civil War.

== Service ==
The battery was organized in August 1861 at Camp Lucas in Clermont County, Ohio and mustered in for a three-year enlistment on December 2, 1861. The regiment was organized as early as 1860 under Ohio's militia laws, under Colonel James Barnett. This battery was recruited in Adams, Brown, and Clermont counties.

The battery was attached to 4th Division, Army of the Ohio, to February 1862. Artillery, 6th Division, Army of the Ohio, to July 1862. Artillery, 4th Division, Army of the Ohio, to September 1862. 19th Brigade, 4th Division, II Corps, Army of the Ohio, to November 1862. Artillery, 2nd Division, Left Wing, XIV Corps, Army of the Cumberland, to January 1863. Artillery, 2nd Division, XXI Corps, Army of the Cumberland, to October 1863. Artillery, 1st Division, Artillery Reserve, Department of the Cumberland, to March 1864. 2nd Division, Artillery Reserve, Department of the Cumberland, to March 1864. Garrison Artillery, Decatur, Alabama, District of Northern Alabama, Department of the Cumberland, to July 1865.

Battery F, 1st Ohio Light Artillery mustered out of service on July 22, 1865.

== Detailed service ==
Moved to Camp Dennison, Ohio, September 1 and mustered in December 2, 1861. Left Ohio for Louisville, Ky., December 3. Moved to Nashville, Tenn., February 10–25, 1862. March to Savannah, Tenn., March 18-April 6. Battle of Shiloh, April 7. Advance on and siege of Corinth, Miss., April 29-May 30. Pursuit to Booneville May 31-June 12. Buell's Campaign in northern Alabama and middle Tennessee June to August. March to Louisville, Ky., in pursuit of Bragg August 21-September 26. Pursuit of Bragg to London, Ky., October 1–22. Battle of Perryville, Ky., October 8 (reserve). Danville October 11. Wild Cat Mountain October 16. Big Rockcastle River October 16. Near Mt. Vernon October 16. Near Crab Orchard October 16. March to Nashville, Tenn., October 23-November 7. Duty at Nashville until December 26. Advance on Murfreesboro December 26–30. Battle of Stones River December 30–31, 1862, and January 1–3, 1863. Woodbury, Tenn., January 24. At Readyville until June. Tullahoma Campaign June 23-July 7. At Manchester until August 16. Passage of Cumberland Mountains and Tennessee River and Chickamauga Campaign August 16-September 22. Battle of Chickamauga, September 19–20. Siege of Chattanooga, September 24-November 23. Battles of Chattanooga November 23–27. Moved to Nashville, Tenn., and duty there until March 1864. Moved to Decatur, Ala., and duty there until July 1865. Expedition from Decatur to Moulton, Ala., July 25–28, 1864. Action at Courtland, Ala., July 25. Siege of Decatur October 26–29, 1864.

== Casualties ==
The battery lost a total of 36 men during service; 1 officer and 7 enlisted men killed or mortally wounded, 28 enlisted men died of disease.

== Commanders ==
- Captain Daniel T. Cockerill - commanded at the battles of Perryville and Stones River
- Lieutenant Norval Osburn - commanded at the battle of Stones River
- Lieutenant Giles J. Cockerill - commanded at the battle of Chickamauga

== See also ==
- List of Ohio Civil War units
- Ohio in the Civil War
