= 58th Indiana Infantry Regiment =

58th Regiment Indiana Infantry
- Active: November 12, 1861 – July 25, 1865
- Country: United States
- Allegiance: Union
- Branch: Infantry
- Engagements: Battle of Shiloh; Siege of Corinth; Battle of Perryville; Battle of Stones River; Tullahoma Campaign; Battle of Chickamauga; Siege of Chattanooga; Battle of Missionary Ridge; Atlanta campaign Battle of Resaca; Siege of Atlanta; Battle of Jonesboro; Sherman's March to the Sea; Carolinas campaign

The 58th Regiment Indiana Infantry was an infantry regiment that served in the Union Army during the American Civil War.

== Service ==
The 58th Indiana Infantry was organized at Princeton and Indianapolis, Indiana, beginning November 12 and mustered in for a three-year enlistment on December 22, 1861.

The regiment was attached to 21st Brigade, Army of the Ohio, January 1862. 21st Brigade, 6th Division, Army of the Ohio, to September 1862. 15th Brigade, 6th Division, II Corps, Army of the Ohio, to November 1862. 1st Brigade, 1st Division, Left Wing, XIV Corps, Army of the Cumberland, to January 1863. 1st Brigade, 21st Division, XXI Corps, Army of the Cumberland, to October 1863. 2nd Brigade, 2nd Division, IV Corps, Army of the Cumberland, to April 1864. Unattached Pontooneers, Army of the Cumberland and Army of Georgia, until July 1865.

The 58th Indiana Infantry mustered out of service at Louisville, Kentucky, on July 25, 1865.

== Detailed service ==
Ordered to Kentucky December 29, and duty at Bardstown and Lebanon, Kentucky, until February 1862. March through central Kentucky to Nashville, Tennessee, February 10-March 1, 1862. March to Savannah, Tennessee, March 18-April 6. Battle of Shiloh, April 6–7 (not engaged). Advance on and siege of Corinth, Mississippi, April 29-May 30. Pursuit to Booneville May 31-June 12. Buell's Campaign in northern Alabama and middle Tennessee along line of the Memphis & Charleston Railroad June to August. Little Pond, near McMinnville, August 30. March to Louisville, Kentucky, in pursuit of Bragg August 30-September 26. Pursuit of Bragg to London, Kentucky, October 1–22. Battle of Perryville, October 8 (reserve). March to Nashville, Tennessee, October 22-November 7, and duty there until December 26. Advance on Murfreesboro December 26–30. Lavergne December 26–27. Battle of Stones River December 30–31, 1862 and January 1–3, 1863. Duty at Murfreesboro until June. Tullahoma Campaign June 23-July 7. Occupation of middle Tennessee until August 16. Passage of the Cumberland Mountains and Tennessee River and Chickamauga Campaign August 16-September 22. Expedition from Tracy City to the Tennessee River August 22–24 (detachment). Occupation of Chattanooga, September 9. Near Lee and Gordon's Mills September 17–18. Battle of Chickamauga, September 19–20. Siege of Chattanooga September 24-November 23. Chattanooga-Ringgold Campaign November 23–27. Orchard Knob November 23–24. Missionary Ridge November 25. Pursuit to Graysville November 26–27. March to relief of Knoxville, November 28-December 8. Operations in eastern Tennessee until April 1864. Reenlisted January 24, 1864. Assigned to duty in charge of the pontoon trains of General Sherman's Army April 1864, and performed all the bridging from Chattanooga to Atlanta, from Atlanta to the sea, and in the campaign through the Carolinas. Atlanta Campaign May 1 to September 8, 1864. Demonstrations on Rocky Faced Ridge May 8–11. Battle of Resaca May 14–15. About Dallas May 25-June 5. About Marietta and Kennesaw Mountain June 10-July 2. Nickajack Creek July 2–5. Chattahoochie River July 5–17. Peachtree Creek July 19–20. Siege of Atlanta July 22-August 25. Flank movement on Jonesboro August 25–30. Battle of Jonesboro August 31-September 1. Pursuit of Hood into Alabama October. March to the sea November 15-December 10. Siege of Savannah December 10–21. Campaign of the Carolinas January to April 1865. Non-veterans mustered out December 31, 1864. March to Washington, D.C., via Richmond, Va., April 29-May 20., Grand Review of the Armies May 24. Moved to Louisville, Kentucky, June.

== Casualties ==
The regiment lost a total of 258 men during service; 4 officers and 60 enlisted men killed or mortally wounded, 2 officers and 192 enlisted men died of disease.

== Commanders ==
- Colonel George Pearson Buell - commanded a brigade at the battle of Stones River due to a division commander being wounded
- Lieutenant Colonel James T. Embree - commanded at the battles of Stones River and Chickamauga

== See also ==
- List of Indiana Civil War regiments
- Indiana in the Civil War
