= 10th Independent Battery Indiana Light Artillery =

- Active: January 25, 1862 – July 10, 1865
- Country: United States
- Allegiance: Union
- Branch: Artillery
- Engagements: Battle of Shiloh; Siege of Corinth; Battle of Perryville; Battle of Stones River; Tullahoma Campaign; Battle of Chickamauga; Siege of Chattanooga; Battle of Lookout Mountain; Battle of Missionary Ridge

10th Indiana Battery Light Artillery was an artillery battery that served in the Union Army during the American Civil War.

== Service ==
The battery was organized at Indianapolis, Indiana, and mustered in for a three-year enlistment on January 25, 1862.

The battery was attached to Artillery, 4th Division, Army of the Ohio, to June 1862. Reserve Artillery, Army of the Ohio, to July 1862. Artillery, 6th Division, Army of the Ohio, to September 1862. 21st Brigade, 6th Division, II Corps, Army of the Ohio, to November 1862. 2nd Brigade, 1st Division, Left Wing, XIV Corps, Army of the Cumberland, to January 1863. Artillery, 1st Division, XXI Corps, Army of the Cumberland, to October 1863. Artillery, 2nd Division, IV Corps, Army of the Cumberland, to March 1864. Garrison Artillery, Chattanooga, Tennessee, Department of the Cumberland, to April 1864. Unattached Artillery, Department of the Cumberland, to August 1864. District of North Alabama, Department of the Cumberland, to July 1865.

The 10th Indiana Battery Light Artillery mustered out of service at Indianapolis on July 10, 1865.

== Detailed service ==
Ordered to Louisville, Kentucky. Advance on Nashville, Tennessee, February 10–25, 1862. Occupation of Nashville February 25-March 17. March to Savannah, Tennessee, March 17-April 6. Battle of Shiloh April 6–7 (reserve). Advance on and siege of Corinth, Mississippi, April 29-May 30. Occupation of Corinth May 30. Pursuit to Booneville May 31-June 12. Buell's Campaign in northern Alabama and middle Tennessee June to August. March to Louisville, Kentucky, in pursuit of Bragg August 21-September 26. Pursuit of Bragg to London, Kentucky, October 1–22. Battle of Perryville, October 8 (reserve). March to Nashville, Tennessee, October 22-November 7, and duty there until December 26. Advance on Murfreesboro December 26–30. Battle of Stones River December 30–31, 1862 and January 1–3, 1863. Duty at Murfreesboro until June. Reconnaissance to Nolensville and Versailles January 13–15. Expedition to McMinnville April 20–30. Tullahoma Campaign June 23-July 7. Occupation of middle Tennessee until August 16. Chickamauga Campaign August 16-September 22. Occupation of Chattanooga, Tennessee, September 9. Assigned to duty as garrison. Siege of Chattanooga September 24-November 24. Chattanooga-Ringgold Campaign November 23–27. Lookout Mountain November 24. Missionary Ridge November 25. Garrison duty at Chattanooga until March 1864. 88 men transferred to 5th and 18th Indiana Batteries March 1864. Balance assigned to duty on gunboat Stone's River and at Decatur, Alabama, until June 19, 1865. Fletcher's Ferry May 18, 1864. Battery brought together June 1865, and duty at Huntsville, Alabama, until July 2. Moved to Indianapolis, July 2–6.

== Casualties ==
The battery lost a total of 27 men during service; 5 enlisted men killed or mortally wounded, 22 enlisted men died of disease.

== Commanders ==
- Captain Jerome B. Cox - resigned June 1, 1863
- Captain William A. Naylor

== See also ==
- List of Indiana Civil War regiments
- Indiana in the Civil War
