= 37th Indiana Infantry Regiment =

37th Regiment Indiana Infantry
- Active: September 18, 1861 – July 25, 1865
- Country: United States
- Allegiance: Union
- Branch: Infantry
- Engagements: Battle of Stones River; Tullahoma Campaign; Battle of Chickamauga; Siege of Chattanooga; Battle of Lookout Mountain; Battle of Missionary Ridge; Atlanta campaign; Battle of Resaca; Battle of Kennesaw Mountain; Siege of Atlanta; Battle of Jonesboro; Sherman's March to the Sea; Carolinas campaign; Battle of Bentonville

The 37th Regiment Indiana Infantry was an infantry regiment that served in the Union Army during the American Civil War.

== Service ==
The 37th Indiana Infantry was organized at Lawrenceburg, Indiana and mustered in for a three-year enlistment on September 18, 1861, under the command of Colonel James S. Hull.

The regiment was attached to 8th Brigade, Army of the Ohio, October to December 1861. 8th Brigade, 3rd Division, Army of the Ohio, to July 1862. Unattached, Army of the Ohio, railroad guard to September 1862. 7th Brigade, 8th Division, Army of the Ohio, to November 1862. 3rd Brigade, 2nd Division, Center, XIV Corps, Army of the Cumberland, to January 1863. 3rd Brigade, 2nd Division, XIV Corps, to October 1863. 3rd Brigade, 1st Division, XIV Corps, to October 1864. 3rd Brigade, 2nd Division, XIV Corps, to July 1865.

The 37th Indiana Infantry mustered out of service at Louisville, Kentucky on July 25, 1865.

== Detailed service ==
Ordered to Kentucky October, and duty at mouth of Salt River and at Bacon Creek until February 1862. Advance on Bowling Green, Kentucky, and Nashville, Tennessee, February 10–25, 1862. Moved to Murfreesboro March 18. Reconnaissance to Shelbyville, Tullahoma, and McMinnville March 25–28. Moved to Fayetteville April 7. Expedition to Huntsville, Alabama, April 10–11. Capture of Huntsville April 11. Advance on and capture of Decatur April 11–14. Guard duty on Nashville & Chattanooga Railroad until August. Elkins' Station, near Athens, May 9 (Company E). Moved to Nashville August 29-September 2, and duty there until December 26. Siege of Nashville September 12-November 7. Advance on Murfreesboro, Tennessee, December 26–30. Battle of Stones River December 30–31, 1862 and January 1–3, 1863. Duty at Murfreesboro until June. Tullahoma Campaign June 23-July 7. Occupation of middle Tennessee until August 16. Passage of the Cumberland Mountains and Tennessee River and Chickamauga Campaign August 16-September 22. Davis Cross Roads or Dug Gap September 11. Battle of Chickamauga September 19–21. Rossville Gap September 21. Siege of Chattanooga, September 24-November 23. Chattanooga-Ringgold Campaign November 23–27. Lookout Mountain November 23–24. Missionary Ridge November 25. Duty at Rossville, Georgia, and Chattanooga, Tennessee, until May 1864. Mulberry Village December 23, 1863 (detachment). Scout from Chattanooga to Harrison and Ooltewah January 21, 1864 (detachment). Demonstration on Dalton, Georgia, February 22–27, 1864. Tunnel Hill, Buzzard's Roost Gap and Rocky Faced Ridge February 23–25, 1864. Atlanta Campaign May 1-September 8. Demonstrations on Rocky Faced Ridge May 8–11. Buzzard's Roost Gap May 8–9. Battle of Resaca May 14–15. Advance on Dallas May 18–25. Operations on line of Pumpkin Vine Creek and battles about Dallas, New Hope Church, and Allatoona Hills May 25-June 5. Pickett's Mill May 27. Operations about Marietta and against Kennesaw Mountain June 10-July 2. Pine Hill June 11–14. Lost Mountain June 15–17. Assault on Kennesaw June 37. Ruff's Station, Smyrna Camp Ground, July 4. Chattahoochee River July 5–17. Peachtree Creek July 19–20. Siege of Atlanta July 22-August 25. Utoy Creek August 5–7. Flank movement on Jonesboro August 25–30. Battle of Jonesboro August 31-September 1. Pursuit of Hood into Alabama October 1–26. March to the sea November 15-December 10. Non-veterans mustered out October 27, 1864. Veterans and recruits consolidated to a battalion of two companies. Near Sandersville November 26. Siege of Savannah December 10–21. Campaign of the Carolinas January to April 1865. Averysboro, North Carolina, March 16. Battle of Bentonville March 19–21. Occupation of Goldsboro March 24. Advance on Raleigh April 10–14. Occupation of Raleigh April 14. Bennett's House April 26. Surrender of Johnston and his army. March to Washington, D.C., via Richmond, Virginia, April 29-May 20. Grand Review of the Armies May 24. Moved to Louisville, Kentucky, June.

== Casualties ==
The regiment lost a total of 226 men during service; 5 officers and 80 enlisted men killed or mortally wounded, 1 officer and 140 enlisted men died of disease.

== Commanders ==
- Colonel James S. Hull
- Colonel George W. Hazzard - killed at the Battle of White Oak Swamp
- Lieutenant Colonel William D. Ward - commanded at the battle of Chickamauga

== See also ==
- List of Indiana Civil War regiments
- Indiana in the Civil War
