= 81st Indiana Infantry Regiment =

81st Regiment Indiana Infantry
- Active: August 29, 1862 – June 13, 1865
- Country: United States
- Allegiance: Union
- Branch: Infantry
- Engagements: Battle of Perryville; Battle of Stones River; Tullahoma Campaign; Battle of Chickamauga; Siege of Chattanooga; Atlanta campaign Battle of Resaca; Battle of Kennesaw Mountain; Siege of Atlanta; Battle of Jonesboro; Second Battle of Franklin; Battle of Nashville

The 81st Regiment Indiana Infantry was an infantry regiment that served in the Union Army during the American Civil War.

== Service ==
The 81st Indiana Infantry was organized and mustered in at New Albany, Indiana for a three-year enlistment on August 29, 1862, under the command of Colonel William W. Caldwell.

The regiment was attached to 32nd Brigade, 9th Division, Army of the Ohio, September 1862. 32nd Brigade, 9th Division, III Corps, Army of the Ohio, to November 1862. 3rd Brigade, 1st Division, Right Wing, XIV Corps, Army of the Cumberland, to January 1863. 3rd Brigade, 1st Division, XX Corps, Army of the Cumberland, to March 1863. 2nd Brigade, 1st Division, XX Corps, to October 1863. 1st Brigade, 1st Division, IV Corps, Army of the Cumberland, to June 1865.

The 81st Indiana Infantry mustered out of service at Nashville, Tennessee, on June 13, 1865.

== Detailed service ==
Ordered to Louisville, Kentucky, August 29. Pursuit of Bragg into Kentucky October 1–15, 1862. Battle of Perryville, October 8. March to Nashville, Tennessee, October 16-November 7, and duty there until December 26. Reconnaissance toward Franklin December 9. Near Brentwood December 9. Advance on Murfreesboro December 26–30. Nolensville December 26–27. Battle of Stones River, December 30–31, 1862 and January 1–3, 1863. Duty at Murfreesboro until June. Reconnaissance from Salem to Versailles March 9–14. Operations on Eaglesville Pike near Murfreesboro June 4. Tullahoma Campaign June 22-July 7. Liberty Gap June 22–27. Duty at Winchester until August. Passage of the Cumberland Mountains and Tennessee River and Chickamauga Campaign August 16-September 22. Battle of Chickamauga, September 19–20. Siege of Chattanooga, September 24-October 25. Reopened Tennessee River October 26–29. Duty at Bridgeport, Alabama, until January 26, 1864, and at Ooltewah until May 1864. Atlanta Campaign May 3 to September 8, 1864. Tunnel Hill May 6–7. Demonstrations on Rocky Faced Ridge and Dalton May 8–13. Buzzard's Roost Gap May 8–9. Battle of Resaca, May 14–15. Near Kingston May 18–19. Near Cassville May 19. Advance on Dallas May 22–25. Operations on line of Pumpkin Vine Creek and battles about Dallas, New Hope Church, and Allatoona Hills May 25-June 5. Operations about Marietta and against Kennesaw Mountain June 10-July 2. Pine Hill June 11–14. Lost Mountain June 15–17. Assault on Kennesaw June 27. Ruff's Station, Smyrna Camp Ground, July 4. Chattahoochie River July 5–17. Peachtree Creek July 19–20. Siege of Atlanta July 22-August 25. Flank movement on Jonesboro August 25–30. Battle of Jonesboro, August 31-September 1. Lovejoy's Station September 2–6. Operations against Hood in northern Georgia and northern Alabama September 29-November 3. Nashville Campaign November–December. Columbia, Duck River, November 24–27. Battle of Franklin, November 30. Battle of Nashville, December 15–16. Pursuit of Hood to the Tennessee River December 17–28. Moved to Huntsville, Alabama, and duty there until March 1865. Operations in eastern Tennessee March 15-April 22. At Nashville until June.

== Casualties ==
The regiment lost a total of 245 men during service; 4 officers and 52 enlisted men killed or mortally wounded, 1 officer and 188 enlisted men died of disease.

== Commanders ==
- Colonel William W. Caldwell - dismissed by President Lincoln, July 7, 1863
- Colonel Oliver P. Anderson - promoted to colonel, but never mustered
- Lieutenant Colonel John Timberlake - commanded at the battles of Perryville and Stones River
- Major James E. Calloway - commanded at the battle of Chickamauga
- Major Edward Gustave Mathey - commanded at the battle of Nashville
- Captain Nevil B. Boone - commanded at the battle of Chickamauga

== See also ==
- List of Indiana Civil War regiments
- Indiana in the Civil War
