= Battery M, 1st Ohio Light Artillery =

- Active: December 3, 1861 to April 11, 1865
- Country: United States
- Allegiance: Union
- Branch: Artillery
- Engagements: Battle of Shiloh; Siege of Corinth; Battle of Stones River; Tullahoma Campaign; Battle of Chickamauga; Siege of Chattanooga; Battle of Missionary Ridge; Battle of Kennesaw Mountain; Battle of Peachtree Creek; Siege of Atlanta; Battle of Jonesboro

Battery M, 1st Ohio Light Artillery was an artillery battery that served in the Union Army during the American Civil War.

== Service ==
The battery was organized at Camp Dennison near Cincinnati, Ohio and mustered in for a three-year enlistment on December 3, 1861. The regiment was organized as early as 1860 under Ohio's militia laws, under Colonel James Barnett.

The battery was attached to Artillery Reserve, Army of the Ohio, to September 1862. 8th Division, Army of the Ohio, to November 1862. Artillery, 2nd Division, Center, XIV Corps, Army of the Cumberland, to January 1863. Artillery, 2nd Division, XIV Corps, to October 1863. 1st Division, Artillery Reserve, Department of the Cumberland, to March 1864. 2nd Division, Artillery Reserve, Department of the Cumberland, to July 1864. Artillery Brigade, IV Corps, Army of the Cumberland, to October 1864. Garrison Artillery, Chattanooga, Tennessee, Department of the Cumberland, to April 1865.

Battery M, 1st Ohio Light Artillery ceased to exist on April 11, 1865 when its members were consolidated with Battery I, 1st Ohio Light Artillery.

== Detailed service ==
Ordered to Louisville, Ky., December 3; thence moved to Bacon Creek, Ky., and duty there until February 1862. March to Nashville, Tenn., February 10-March 3, 1862, and to Savannah, Tenn., March 17-April 6. Battle of Shiloh, April 7. Advance on and siege of Corinth, Miss., April 29-May 30. Buell's Campaign in northern Alabama and middle Tennessee June to August. Garrison duty at Nashville, Tenn., August to December 1862. Advance on Murfreesboro, Tenn., December 26–30. Battle of Stones River December 30–31, 1862 and January 1–3, 1863. Duty at Murfreesboro until June. Tullahoma Campaign June 23-July 7. Occupation of middle Tennessee until August 16. Passage of Cumberland Mountains and Tennessee River and Chickamauga Campaign August 16-September 22. Davis Cross Roads or Dug Gap September 11. Near Blue Bird Gap September 11. Battle of Chickamauga September 19–21. Siege of Chattanooga, Tenn., September 24-November 23. Chattanooga-Ringgold Campaign November 23–27. Missionary Ridge November 24–25. Ordered to Nashville, Tenn., December 1863, and duty there until June 1864. Joined Sherman's army at Kennesaw Mountain, Ga., June 25. Operations against Kennesaw Mountain June 25-July 2. Assault on Kennesaw June 27. Chattahoochie River July 3–17. Peachtree Creek July 19–20. Siege of Atlanta July 22-August 25. Flank movement on Jonesboro August 25–30. Battle of Jonesboro August 31-September 1. Ordered to Chattanooga, September, and duty there until December. Mustered out non-veterans at Camp Dennison, Ohio, December 17, 1864. Veterans and recruits garrison at Chattanooga, until April 1865.

== Casualties ==
The battery lost a total of 19 men during service; 2 enlisted men killed or mortally wounded, 17 enlisted men died of disease.

== Commanders ==
- Captain Frederick Schultz

== See also ==
- List of Ohio Civil War units
- Ohio in the Civil War
