= 7th Independent Battery Indiana Light Artillery =

- Active: December 2, 1861 – July 20, 1865
- Country: United States
- Allegiance: Union
- Branch: Artillery
- Engagements: Battle of Shiloh; Siege of Corinth; Battle of Perryville; Battle of Stones River; Tullahoma Campaign; Battle of Chickamauga; Siege of Chattanooga; Battle of Lookout Mountain; Battle of Missionary Ridge; Atlanta campaign Battle of Resaca; Battle of Kennesaw Mountain; Battle of Peachtree Creek; Siege of Atlanta; Battle of Jonesboro

7th Indiana Battery Light Artillery was an artillery battery that served in the Union Army during the American Civil War.

== Service ==
The battery was organized at Indianapolis, Indiana and mustered in for a three-year enlistment on December 2, 1861, under the command of Captain George R. Swallow.

The battery was attached to Artillery, 4th Division, Army of the Ohio, to June 1862. Artillery, 1st Division, Army of the Ohio, to September 1862. Artillery, 5th Division, II Corps, Army of the Ohio, to November 1862. Artillery, 3rd Division, Left Wing, XIV Corps, Army of the Cumberland, to January 1863. Artillery, 3rd Division, XXI Corps, Army of the Cumberland, to October 1863. Artillery, 3rd Division, XIV Corps, to July 1864. Artillery Brigade, XIV Corps, to October 1864. Garrison Artillery, Chattanooga, Tennessee, Department of the Cumberland, to April 1865. 2nd Brigade, 4th Division, District of East Tennessee, Department of the Cumberland, to July 1865.

Veterans and recruits from the 8th Independent Battery Indiana Light Artillery were consolidated with the battery on March 13, 1865. The 7th Indiana Battery Light Artillery mustered out of service on July 20, 1865.

== Detailed service ==
Left Indiana for Louisville, Kentucky, December 6. Duty at Camp Wickliffe, Kentucky, until February 1862. Advance on Nashville, Tennessee, February 14–25. Occupation of Nashville, February 25 to March 17. March to Savannah, Tennessee, March 17-April 6. Battle of Shiloh, April 6–7. Advance on and siege of Corinth, Mississippi, April 29-May 30. Pursuit to Booneville May 31-June 12. Buell's Campaign in northern Alabama and middle Tennessee June to August. March to Louisville, Kentucky, in pursuit of Bragg August 21-September 26. Pursuit of Bragg to London, Kentucky, October 1–20. Battle of Perryville, October 8 (reserve). Nelson's Cross Roads October 18. March to Nashville, Tennessee, October 20-November 7 and duty there until December 26. Dobbin's Ferry, near Lavergne, December 9. Advance on Murfreesboro December 26–30. Battle of Stones River December 30–31, 1862 and January 1–3, 1863. Duty at Murfreesboro until June. Tullahoma Campaign June 23-July 7. Occupation of middle Tennessee until August 16. Passage of the Cumberland Mountains and Tennessee River and Chickamauga Campaign August 16-September 22. Battle of Chickamauga September 19–20. Siege of Chattanooga, Tennessee, September 24-November 23. Lookout Mountain November 23–24. Missionary Ridge November 25. Duty at Chattanooga and Ringgold, Georgia, until May 1864. Reconnaissance from Ringgold toward Tunnel Hill April 29. Atlanta Campaign May to September. Demonstrations on Rocky Faced Ridge May 8–11. Battle of Resaca May 14–15. Advance on Dallas May 18–25. Operations on line of Pumpkin Vine Creek and battles about Dallas, New Hope Church, and Allatoona Hills May 25-June 5. Operations about Marietta and against Kennesaw Mountain June 10-July 2, Pine Hill June 11–14. Lost Mountain June 15–17. Assault on Kennesaw June 27. Ruff's Station July 4. Chattahoochie River July 5–17. Peachtree Creek July 19–20. Siege of Atlanta July 22-August 25. Utoy Creek August 5–7. Flank movement on Jonesboro August 25–30. Battle of Jonesboro August 31-September 1. Ordered to Chattanooga, Tennessee, September 20, and post duty there until December. Old members mustered out December 7, 1864. Veterans and recruits on duty at Chattanooga, Tennessee, until July 1865.

== Casualties ==
The battery lost a total of 29 men during service; 1 officer and 6 enlisted men killed or mortally wounded, 22 enlisted men died of disease.

== Commanders ==
- Captain George R. Swallow

== See also ==
- List of Indiana Civil War regiments
- Indiana in the Civil War
