= Chicago Board of Trade Independent Battery Light Artillery =

Chicago Board of Trade Battery
- Active: April 21, 1861 – June 18, 1864
- Country: United States
- Allegiance: Union
- Branch: Artillery
- Engagements: Battle of Stones River; Battle of Chickamauga; Atlanta campaign Battle of Ladiga; Battle of Nashville

The Chicago Board of Trade Battery was an artillery battery that served in the Union Army during the American Civil War.

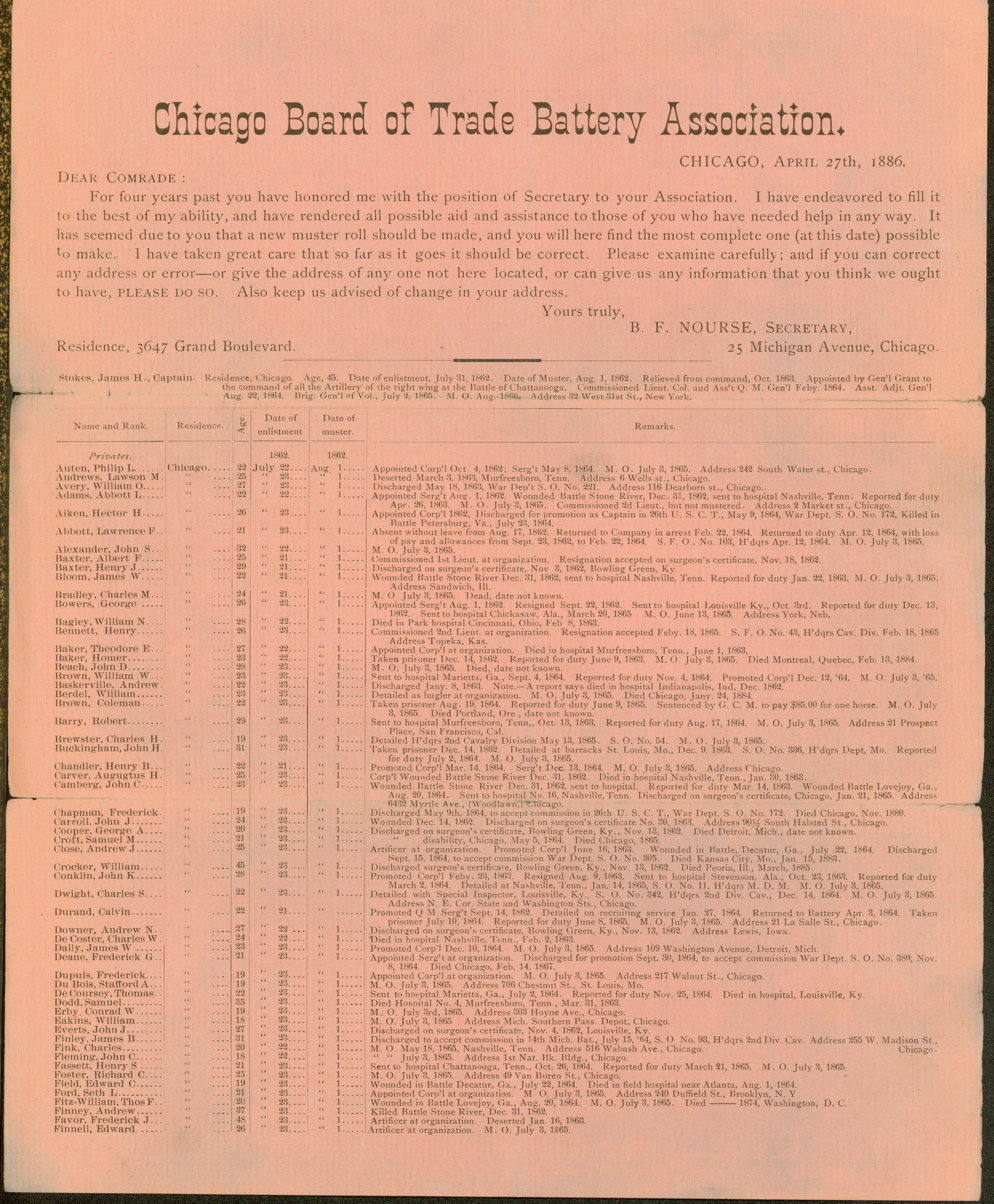
Roster of the Chicago Board of Trade Battery Association, April 27, 1886

== Service ==
The Chicago Board of Trade Battery was mustered into service at Chicago, Illinois, on August 1, 1862. It was sponsored by the Chicago Board of Trade, from which the battery took its name. In March 1863, the battery changed from mounted field artillery to "flying" horse artillery, the only battery of flying artillery in the Union Western armies. The battery was mustered out on June 30, 1865, in Chicago.

== Total strength and casualties ==
During its term of service, the battery lost 10 enlisted men killed in action or died of their wounds and 9 enlisted men who died of disease, for a total of 19 fatalities.

== Commanders ==
- Captain James H. Stokes (1816–1890) – mustered out August 22, 1864, upon expiration of his term of enlistment
- Captain George I. Robinson – mustered out with the battery following the war

=== Notable soldiers ===
- Phil Auten (1840–1919) – business executive and co-owner of the Pittsburgh Pirates

== See also ==
- List of Illinois Civil War Units
- Illinois in the American Civil War
