= 38th Indiana Infantry Regiment =

38th Regiment Indiana Infantry
- Active: September 18, 1861 – July 15, 1865
- Country: United States
- Allegiance: Union
- Branch: Infantry
- Engagements: Battle of Perryville; Battle of Stones River; Tullahoma Campaign; Battle of Chickamauga; Chattanooga campaign; Battle of Lookout Mountain; Battle of Missionary Ridge; Atlanta campaign; Battle of Resaca; Battle of Kennesaw Mountain; Siege of Atlanta; Battle of Jonesboro; Sherman's March to the Sea; Carolinas campaign; Battle of Bentonville

The 38th Regiment Indiana Infantry was an infantry regiment that served in the Union Army during the American Civil War.

== Service ==
The 38th Indiana Infantry was organized at New Albany, Indiana and mustered in for a three-year enlistment on September 18, 1861, under the command of Colonel Benjamin Franklin Scribner.

The regiment was attached to Wood's Brigade, McCook's Command, at Nolin, Kentucky, October–November 1861. 7th Brigade, Army of the Ohio, to December 1861. 7th Brigade, 2nd Division, Army of the Ohio, to March 1862. 7th Independent Brigade, Army of the Ohio, to July 1862. 9th Brigade, 3rd Division, Army of the Ohio, to September 1862. 9th Brigade, 3rd Division, I Corps, Army of the Ohio, to November 1862. 1st Brigade, 1st Division, Center, XIV Corps, Army of the Cumberland, to January 1863. 1st Brigade, 1st Division, XIV Corps, to April 1864. 3rd Brigade, 1st Division, XIV Corps, to June 1865. 1st Brigade, 1st Division, XIV Corps, to July 1865.

The 38th Indiana Infantry mustered out of service at Louisville, Kentucky on July 15, 1865.

== Detailed service ==
- Ordered to Elizabethtown, Kentucky, September 21, and duty at Camp Nevin on Nolin Creek until February 1862.
- Advance on Bowling Green, Kentucky, and Nashville, Tennessee, February 10-March 6, 1862.
- Moved to Franklin March 25, then to Columbia and Shelbyville.
- Duty at Shelbyville until May 11.
- Action at Rogersville May 13.
- Expedition to Chattanooga May 28-June 16.
- Chattanooga June 7.
- Guard duty at Shelbyville and Stevenson until August.
- Moved to Dechard August 17, then march to Louisville, Kentucky, in pursuit of Bragg, August 21-September 26.
- Pursuit of Bragg into Kentucky October 1–15.
- Battle of Perryville October 8.
- March to Nashville, Tennessee, October 16-November 7, and duty there until December 26.
- Advance on Murfreesboro December 26–30.
- Battle of Stones River December 30–31, 1862 and January 1–3, 1863.
- Duty at Murfreesboro until June.
- Tullahoma Campaign June 24-July 7.
- Hoover's Gap June 24–26.
- Occupation of middle Tennessee until August 16.
- Passage of the Cumberland Mountains and Tennessee River and Chickamauga Campaign August 16-September 22.
- Davis Cross Roads, Dug Gap, September 11.
- Battle of Chickamauga September 19–21.
- Rossville Gap September 21.
- Siege of Chattanooga, September 24-November 23.
- Chattanooga-Ringgold Campaign November 23–27.
- Lookout Mountain November 23–24.
- Missionary Ridge November 25.
- Pea Vine Creek and Graysville November 26.
- Ringgold Gap, Tay1or's Ridge, November 27.
- Duty at Rossville, Georgia, and Chattanooga, Tennessee, until February 1864, and at Tyner's Station and Graysville until May.
- Atlanta Campaign May 1 to September 8.
- Demonstration on Rocky Faced Ridge May 8–11.
- Buzzard's Roost Gap May 8–9.
- Battle of Resaca May 14–15.
- Advance on Dallas May 18–25.
- Operations on Pumpkin Vine Creek and battles about Dallas, New Hope Church, and Allatoona Hills May 25-June 5.
- Pickett's Mills May 27.
- Operations about Marietta and against Kennesaw Mountain June 10-July 2.
- Pine Hill June 11–14.
- Lost Mountain June 15–17.
- Assault on Kennesaw June 27.
- Ruff's Station, Smyrna Camp Ground, July 4.
- Chattahoochee River July 5–17.
- Peachtree Creek July 19–20.
- Siege of Atlanta July 22-August 25.
- Utoy Creek August 5–7.
- Flank movement on Jonesboro August 25–30.
- Battle of Jonesboro August 31-September 1.
- Pursuit of Hood into Alabama October 3–26.
- March to the Sea November 15-December 10.
- Siege of Savannah December 10–21.
- Campaign of the Carolinas January to April, 1865.
- Averysboro, North Carolina, March 16.
- Battle of Bentonville March 19–21.
- Occupation of Goldsboro March 24.
- Advance on Raleigh April 10–14.
- Occupation of Raleigh April 14.
- Bennett's House April 26.
- Surrender of Johnston and his army. March to Washington, D.C., via Richmond, Virginia, April 29-May 20.
- Grand Review of the Armies May 24.
- Moved to Louisville, Kentucky, June.

== Casualties ==
The regiment lost a total of 411 men during service; 9 officers and 147 enlisted men killed or mortally wounded, 1 officer and 254 enlisted men died of disease.

== Commanders ==
- Colonel Benjamin Franklin Scribner
- Colonel David Henry Patton
- Lieutenant Colonel Daniel F. Griffin
- Captain James H. Low

== Notable members ==
- 2nd Lieutenant Leander "Lee" Clow, Company A - sheriff of Hempstead County, Arkansas; member of Arkansas State Legislature
- Lieutenant Colonel Walter Quintin Gresham - U.S. Postmaster General, 1883; U.S. Secretary of State, 1893–1895; U.S. Secretary of the Treasury, 1884
- Major John Glover - treasurer of Lawrence County, Indiana, 1868; Indiana State Treasurer 1873–1875; U.S. Consul to Harve, France, 1881
- Colonel David H. Patton - U.S. Representative from Indiana, 1891–1893
- Captain Gabriel Poindexter, Company H - mayor of Jeffersonville, Indiana, 1867–1869

== See also ==
- List of Indiana Civil War regiments
- Indiana in the Civil War
