= 25th Illinois Infantry Regiment =

25th Regiment Illinois Volunteer Infantry
- Illinois state flag
- Active: August 4, 1861, to September 5, 1864
- Country: United States
- Allegiance: Union
- Branch: Infantry
- Engagements: American Civil War: Battle of Pea Ridge; Siege of Corinth; Battle of Stones River; Battle of Chickamauga; Battle of Missionary Ridge; Battle of Kennesaw Mountain; Siege of Atlanta

The 25th Regiment, Illinois Volunteer Infantry, was an infantry regiment that served in the Union Army during the American Civil War.

== Service ==
The 25th Regiment Illinois Volunteer Infantry was organized on June 1, 1861, and mustered in Saint Louis, Missouri, into Federal service for 3 years on August 4, 1861, following President Abraham Lincoln's May 1861 call for volunteers to serve for 3 years in regiments organized by state governments. It was assigned to: the Army of Southwest Missouri under Brigadier General Samuel R. Curtis, August 1861 to June 1862; Army of the Mississippi under Brigadier General John Pope, June 1862 to September 1862; Army of the Ohio, September 1862 to November 1862; and Army of the Cumberland, November 1862 to August 1864.

The 25th Illinois was within sight of Atlanta, Georgia, on September 1, 1864, when it was ordered to Camp Butler, near Springfield, Illinois. There, the 25th Illinois was mustered out of service on September 5, 1864, having completed its term of enlistment.

== Notable Battles ==
=== Battle of Pea Ridge ===
On March 6 and 7th, 1862 the 25th Regiment of Illinois Volunteers were held in support. On the 8th they were ordered to advance, charging into Confederate positions amid thick woods, fighting brutally until the Confederate line broke.

=== Siege Of Corinth ===
The 25th Regiment of Illinois Volunteers marched to Cape Girardeau, MO under General Jeff C. Davis after the Battle of Pea Ridge. Transported by boat, they joined under General Hallecks for the siege of Corinth, MS. They remained until the Confederates withdrew.

=== Battle of Stones River ===
The Confederate attack on the dawn of December 31 cost the Illinois 25th a third of their numbers as the unit found itself flanked on the left and right, the 25th pushed back two assaults by the Confederates. The color-bear was killed and the colors were raised by Colonel Williams with a rallying cry. He soon fell and the unit withdrew. As a response to General Breckenridge's attack on the same flank, the 19th Illinois Volunteer Regiment moved forward, supported by the rest of the 25th. They held the line long enough for Captain John Mendenhall's artillery to repel General Breckenridge's attack.

=== Battle of Chickamauga ===
The 25th Regiment of Illinois Volunteers were tasked with establishing pontoon crossings near Stevenson, AL. This action allowed the army to cross the river and engage in the Battle of Chickamauga, where the 25th would go on to lose 2/3 of their men.

=== Battle of Missionary Ridge ===
The 25th Regiment of Illinois Volunteers fought side-by-side with the 35th Regiment of Illinois Volunteers in General Thomas's assault on the Confederate center.

=== Total strength and casualties ===
The 25th Illinois lost 3 officers and 80 enlisted men killed or mortally wounded, and 1 officer and 148 enlisted men by disease, for a total of 232 fatalities.

== Commanders ==
- Colonel William N. Coler - resigned on August 31, 1862.
- Colonel Thomas D. Williams - killed in action on December 31, 1862, in the Battle of Stones River.
- Colonel Caswell P. Ford - resigned on April 14, 1863.
- Colonel Richard H. Nodine - mustered out with the regiment on September 5, 1864.

== See also ==
- List of Illinois Civil War Units
- Illinois in the American Civil War
