= 78th Pennsylvania Infantry Regiment =

Union Army infantry regiment

78th Pennsylvania Volunteer Infantry
- Active: October 15, 1861, to September 11, 1865
- Country: United States
- Allegiance: Union
- Branch: Infantry
- Engagements: Battle of Stones River; Tullahoma Campaign; Battle of Chickamauga; Siege of Chattanooga; Battle of Missionary Ridge; Atlanta campaign Battle of Resaca; Battle of Nashville

The 78th Pennsylvania Volunteer Infantry was an infantry regiment that served in the Union Army during the American Civil War.

== Service ==
The 78th Pennsylvania Infantry was organized at Pittsburgh, Pennsylvania and mustered in for a three-year enlistment on October 12, 1861, under the command of Colonel William Sirwell.

The regiment was attached to Negley's 4th Brigade, McCook's Division, at Nolin, to November 1861. 7th Brigade, Army of the Ohio, to December 1861. 7th Brigade, 2nd Division, Army of the Ohio, to March 1862. Negley's Independent Brigade, Army of the Ohio, to August 1862. 7th Brigade, 8th Division, Army of the Ohio, to November 1862. 3rd Brigade, 2nd Division, Centre, Army of the Cumberland, to January 1863. 3rd Brigade, 2nd Division, XIV Corps, Army of the Cumberland, to October 1863. 3rd Brigade, 1st Division, XIV Corps, to July 1864. Unassigned, 4th Division, XX Corps, Department of the Cumberland, to October 1864. Garrison duty at Nashville, Tenn., to September 1865.

The 78th Pennsylvania Infantry mustered out of service on September 11, 1865.

== Casualties ==
The regiment lost a total of 267 men during service; 2 officers and 68 enlisted men killed or mortally wounded, 3 officers and 194 enlisted men died of disease.

== Commanders ==
- Colonel William Sirwell
- Lieutenant Colonel Archibald Blakeley - commanded at the battle of Chickamauga
- Major Henry W. Torbett - commanded at the battle of Nashville

== See also ==
- List of Pennsylvania Civil War Units
- Pennsylvania in the Civil War
