= 2nd Kentucky Cavalry Regiment =

- Active: September 9, 1861 – July 27, 1865
- Country: United States
- Allegiance: Union
- Branch: Cavalry
- Engagements: Battle of Shiloh; Siege of Corinth; Battle of Perryville; Battle of Stones River; Tullahoma Campaign; Battle of Chickamauga; Atlanta campaign Battle of Resaca; Siege of Atlanta; Battle of Jonesboro; Sherman's March to the Sea; Siege of Savannah; Carolinas campaign Battle of Bentonville

The 2nd Kentucky Cavalry Regiment was a cavalry regiment that served in the Union Army during the American Civil War.

== Service ==
The 2nd Kentucky Cavalry Regiment was organized at Camp Joe Holt and Muldraugh's Hill, Kentucky and mustered in for a three-year enlistment on September 9, 1861, under the command of Colonel Buckner Board.

The regiment was attached to Rousseau's Brigade, McCook's Command, Army of the Ohio, October 1861 to December 1861. 2nd Division, Army of the Ohio, to September 1862. Unattached Cavalry, I Corps, Army of the Ohio, to November 1862. Cavalry, 1st Division, Center, XIV Corps, Army of the Cumberland, to January 1863. 2nd Brigade, 2nd Cavalry Division, Army of the Cumberland, to April 1864. 2nd Brigade, 3rd Division, Cavalry Corps, Army of the Cumberland, to October 1864. 2nd Brigade, 3rd Division, Cavalry Corps, Military Division Mississippi, to November 1864. 1st Brigade, 3rd Division, Cavalry Corps, Military Division Mississippi, to July 1865.

The 2nd Kentucky Cavalry mustered out of service at Camp Joe Holt beginning on July 9, 1865, and ending on July 27, 1865.

== Detailed service ==
At Bacon Creek and Green River, Kentucky, until February 1862. March to Nashville, Tennessee, February 10–25, then to Savannah, Tennessee, March 31-April 7. Battle of Shiloh, April 7–8. Advance on and siege of Corinth, Mississippi, April 29-May 30. Duty at Corinth until June 10. Buell's Campaign in northern Alabama and middle Tennessee June to August. March to Louisville, Kentucky, in pursuit of Bragg August 21-September 26. Woodburn, Kentucky, September 10. Pursuit of Bragg into Kentucky October 1–22. Near Bardstown October 4. Battle of Perryville October 8. Pursuit to London October 10–22. Bloomfield October 18. March to Nashville, Tennessee, October 22-November 7. Duty there until December 26. Nolensville December 20. Advance on Murfreesboro December 26–30. Battle of Stones River December 30–31, 1862 and January 1–3, 1863. At Murfreesboro until June. Expedition to McMinnville April 20–30. Wartrace Road June 13. Tullahoma Campaign June 24-July 7. Near Hillsborough June 29. Tullahoma July 1. Bob's Cross Roads July 1. Moore's Ford and Rock Creek Ford, Elk River, July 2. Boiling Fork, near Winchester, July 3. Expedition to Huntsville July 13–22. Passage of Cumberland Mountains and Tennessee River, and Chickamauga Campaign August 16-September 22. Alpine, Georgia, September 3 and 8. Reconnaissance toward LaFayette September 10. Neal's Gap September 17. Battle of Chickamauga September 19–21. Near Philadelphia September 27. Operations against Wheeler and Roddy September 30-October 17. Pitt's Cross Roads, Sequatchie Valley, October 2. Hill's Gap, Thompson's Cove, October 3. Murfreesboro Road, near McMinnville, October 4. McMinnville October 4. Farmington October 7. Sim's Farm, near Shelbyville, October 7. Lookout Mountain November 24 (detachment). Missionary Ridge November 25 (detachment). March to relief of Knoxville November 28-December 8. At Bridgeport, Ala., until May 1864. Scouts to Caperton's Ferry March 28 (detachment). Atlanta Campaign May to September. Near Resaca May 13. Battle of Resaca May 14–15. Kingston May 24. Dalton May 27. Rousseau's Opelika Raid from Decatur on West Point & Montgomery Railroad July 10–22. Ten Island Ford, Coosa River, July 14. Siege of Atlanta July 22-August 25. McCook's Raid on Atlanta and West Point and Macon & Western Railroad July 27–31. Lovejoy's Station and Smith's Cross Roads July 29. Clear Creek and near Newman's July 30. Kilpatrick's Raid around Atlanta August 18–22. Camp Creek August 18. Jonesboro August 19. Lovejoy's Station August 20. Flank movement on Jonesboro August 25–30. Flint River Station August 30. Battle of Jonesboro August 31-September 1. Lovejoy's Station September 2–6. Operations against Hood September 29-November 3. Camp Creek September 30. Sweetwater and Noyes Creek, near Powder Springs, October 1–3. Van Wert October 9–10. Marietta November 6. March to the sea November 15-December 10. Lovejoy's Station November 16. Griswoldsville November 22. Sylvan Grove and near Waynesboro November 27. Waynesboro November 27–28. Near Waynesboro November 28. Near Louisville November 30. Millen or Shady Grove December 1. Waynesboro December 4. Siege of Savannah December 10–21. Campaign of the Carolinas January to April 1865. Blackville, South Carolina, February 7. Williston February 8. Johnson's Station February 10. Phillips Cross Roads, North Carolina, March 4. Monroe's Cross Roads March 8. Averysboro, Taylor's Hole Creek, North Carolina, March 16. Battle of Bentonville March 19–21. Occupation of Raleigh and Moresville April 13. Chapel Hill April 15. Bennett's House April 26. Surrender of Johnston and his army. Duty at Mt. Olive, Lexington, and Durham, North Carolina, until July. Mustered out at Camp Joe Holt, Kentucky, July 9–27, 1865.

== Casualties ==
The regiment lost a total of 179 men during service; 5 officers and 51 enlisted men killed or mortally wounded, 1 officer and 122 enlisted men died of disease.

== Commanders ==
- Colonel Buckner Board - resigned December 25, 1862
- Colonel Thomas P. Nicholas
- Lieutenant Colonel Thomas Cochran

== See also ==
- List of Kentucky Civil War Units
- Kentucky in the Civil War
