= 79th Pennsylvania Infantry Regiment =

Union Army infantry regiment

79th Pennsylvania Volunteer Infantry
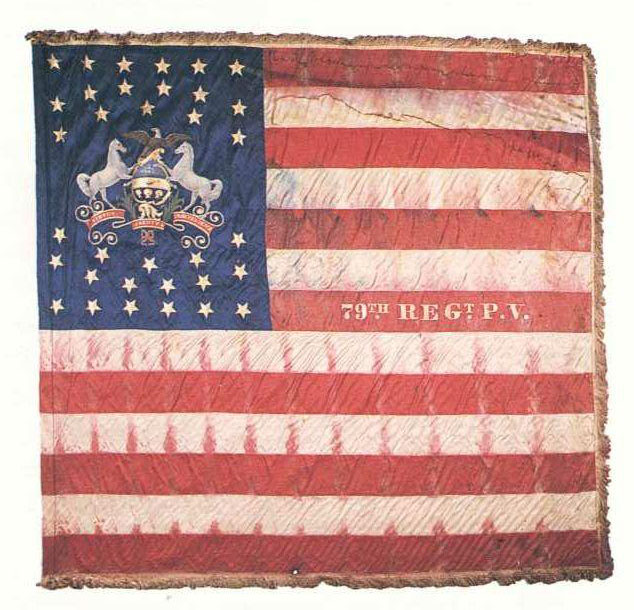
- National Colors of the 79th Pennsylvania Infantry Regiment
- Active: September 19, 1861, to July 12, 1865
- Country: United States
- Allegiance: Union
- Branch: Infantry
- Engagements: Battle of Perryville; Battle of Stones River; Tullahoma Campaign; Battle of Chickamauga; Siege of Chattanooga; Battle of Chattanooga; Battle of Resaca; Battle of Kennesaw Mountain; Battle of Peachtree Creek; Siege of Atlanta; Battle of Jonesboro; Sherman's March to the Sea; Carolinas campaign Battle of Bentonville

The 79th Pennsylvania Volunteer Infantry (also known as the "Lancaster Rifles") was an infantry regiment that served in the Union Army during the American Civil War.

== Service ==
The 79th Pennsylvania Infantry was organized at Lancaster, Pennsylvania and mustered in for a three-year enlistment on September 19, 1861, under the command of Colonel Henry Augustus Hambright. The regiment was recruited in Lancaster and Washington counties.

The regiment was attached to Negley's 4th Brigade, McCook's Command, at Nolin, to November 1861. 7th Brigade, Army of the Ohio, to December 1861. 7th Brigade, 2nd Division, Army of the Ohio, to March 1862. Negley's Independent Brigade, Army of the Ohio, to August 1862. 28th Brigade, 3rd Division, Army of the Ohio, to September 1862. 28th Brigade, 3rd Division, I Corps, Army of the Ohio, to November 1862. 3rd Brigade, 1st Division, Centre, Army of the Cumberland, to January 1863. 3rd Brigade, 1st Division, XIV Corps, Army of the Cumberland, to April 1863. 2nd Brigade, 1st Division, XIV Corps, to October 1863. 3rd Brigade, 1st Division, XIV Corps, to July 1865.

The 79th Pennsylvania Infantry mustered out of service on July 12, 1865.

== Detailed service ==
Moved to Pittsburg, thence to Louisville, Ky., October 18, and to Nolin Station, Ky., October 24. Duty at Nolin until December 1861, and at Munfordville until February 1862. Moved to Bowling Green, Ky., thence to Nashville, Tenn., February 14-March 3. At Nashville until March 28. Ordered to Columbia, Tenn., and guard Nashville & Decatur Railroad until May. Expedition to Rodgersville, Ala., May 13–14. Lamb's Ferry May 14. Negley's Expedition to Chattanooga May 28-June 17. Jasper, Sweeden's Cove, June 4. Chattanooga June 7–8. Ordered to Tullahoma, Tenn., and duty there until August. Ordered to Nashville, thence march to Louisville, Ky., in pursuit of Bragg August 21-September 26. Pursuit of Bragg into Kentucky October 1–16. Battle of Perryville October 8. Guard Louisville & Nashville Railroad at Mitchellsville November 9-December 7. Advance on Murfreesboro December 26–30. Jefferson December 30. Battle of Stones River December 30–31, 1862 and January 1–3, 1863. Duty at Murfreesboro until June. Expedition to McMinnville April 20–30. Tullahoma Campaign June 23-July 7. Hoover's Gap June 24–26. Occupation of middle Tennessee until August 16. Passage of Cumberland Mountains and Tennessee River, and Chickamauga Campaign August 16-September 22. Davis Cross Roads or Dug Gap September 11. Battle of Chickamauga September 19–21. Rossville Gap September 21. Siege of Chattanooga September 24-October 26. Reopening Tennessee River October 26–29. Battle of Chattanooga November 23–25. Reenlisted February 9, 1864. Veterans on furlough March and April. Atlanta Campaign May 1-September 8. Demonstration on Rocky Faced Ridge May 8–11. Battle of Resaca May 14–15. Operations on line of Pumpkin Vine Creek and battles about Dallas, New Hope Church and Allatoona Hills May 25-June 5. Pickett's Mills May 27. Operations about Marietta and against Kennesaw Mountain June 10-July 2. Pine Hill June 11–14. Lost Mountain June 15–17. Assault on Kennesaw June 27. Ruff's Station, Smyrna Camp Ground, July 4. Chattahoochie River July 5–17. Peachtree Creek July 19–20. Siege of Atlanta July 22-August 25. Utoy Creek August 5–7. Flank movement on Jonesboro August 25–30. Battle of Jonesboro August 31-September 1. Operations in northern Georgia and northern Alabama against Hood September 29-November 3. March to the Sea November 15-December 10. Siege of Savannah December 10–21. Campaign of the Carolinas January to April, 1865. League Cross Roads, near Lexington, S.C., February 15. Cloud's House February 27. Averysboro, N. C., March 16. Battle of Bentonville March 19–21. Occupation of Goldsboro March 24. Advance on Raleigh April 9–13. Occupation of Raleigh April 14. Bennett's House April 26. Surrender of Johnston and his army. March to Washington, D.C., via Richmond, Va., April 29-May 20. Washington, D.C. for the Grand Review of the Armies May 24.

== Casualties ==
The regiment lost a total of 268 men during service; 4 officers and 118 enlisted men killed or mortally wounded, 1 officer and 145 enlisted men died of disease.

== Commanders ==
- Colonel Henry Augustus Hambright

== See also ==
- List of Pennsylvania Civil War Units
- Pennsylvania in the Civil War
