= 44th Illinois Infantry Regiment =

44th Regiment Illinois Volunteer Infantry "Northwest Rifles"
- Illinois state flag
- Active: September 13, 1861, to September 25, 1865
- Country: United States
- Allegiance: Union
- Branch: Infantry
- Engagements: Battle of Pea Ridge; Battle of Perryville; Battle of Stone's River; Battle of Chickamauga; Siege of Chattanooga; Battle of Resaca; Battle of Kennesaw Mountain; Siege of Atlanta; Battle of Jonesboro; Battle of Franklin; Battle of Nashville

The 44th Regiment Illinois Volunteer Infantry also nicknamed the "Northwest Rifles" was an infantry regiment that served in the Union Army during the American Civil War.

== Service ==
The 44th Illinois Infantry was organized at Chicago, Illinois and mustered into Federal service on September 25, 1861.

The regiment was mustered out on November 30, 1865.

== Total strength and casualties ==
The regiment suffered 6 officers and 129 enlisted men who were killed in action or mortally wounded and 1 officer and 156 enlisted men who died of disease, for a total of 292 fatalities.

== Commanders ==
- Colonel Charles Knobelsdorff - dismissed due to disability on August 20, 1862.
- Colonel Wallace W. Barrett - mustered out with the regiment.

== See also ==
- List of Illinois Civil War Units
- Illinois in the American Civil War
- 15 Letters Written by Germans in the 44th Illinois Infantry
