= 22nd Illinois Infantry Regiment =

22nd Regiment Illinois Volunteer Infantry
- Illinois state flag
- Active: June 25, 1861, to July 7, 1864
- Country: United States
- Allegiance: Union
- Branch: Infantry
- Engagements: Battle of Belmont; Battle of Farmington; Siege of Corinth; Battle of Stones River; Battle of Chickamauga; Battle of Missionary Ridge; Battle of Resaca; Battle of New Hope Church

The 22nd Regiment Illinois Volunteer Infantry was an infantry regiment that served in the Union Army during the American Civil War.

== Service ==
The 22nd Illinois Infantry was organized at Belleville, Illinois, and mustered into Federal service on June 25, 1861, for three-year service. Shortly after being mustered, the regiment moved to Bird's Point, Missouri.

In November 1861, seven companies of the regiment participated in the Battle of Belmont, sustaining 144 casualties. In early 1862, the regiment engaged in raids and running fights in Missouri, including a hand-to-hand engagement at Charleston and a successful skirmish at Sikeston that drove Confederate forces to New Madrid.

=== Island No. 10 and Corinth ===
In April 1862, the regiment joined an expedition to Tiptonville to intercept Confederate forces retreating from Island No. 10, resulting in the capture of 4,000 prisoners and significant military stores. The regiment later participated in the Battle of Farmington and the Siege of Corinth. Following the Evacuation of Corinth, the regiment spent the summer conducting garrison duty on the Memphis and Charleston Railroad before making a forced march to Nashville.

=== Battle of Stones River ===
At the Battle of Stones River, the 22nd Illinois suffered heavy losses, with them going into battle with 342 men and losing 199. Notably, every single horse belonging to the regiment and its attached battery was killed during the engagement. Lieutenant Colonel Swanwick was wounded, captured, and sent to Libby Prison.

=== Chickamauga and Missionary Ridge ===
In September 1863, the regiment was engaged at the Battle of Chickamauga, where they fought at the Extreme right of Sheridan's Army. The fighting was Intense; On September 19, the regiment lost 96 of its members in less than 10 minutes. In total, the regiment lost 135 out of their 300 engaged.

The regiment later participated in the Battle of Missionary Ridge in November 1863, losing an additional 30 to 40 men.

The winter of 1863-1864 was spent in the mountains of East Tennessee, where the men suffered from severe exposure and a lack of provisions. The regiment reportedly went 6 months without receiving full rations until March 1864.

In the spring of 1864, the remnants of the 22nd Illinois Joined in on the Atlanta Campaign. The regiment saw action at the Battle of Resaca, and was under fire for eleven consecutive days at New Hope Church.

On June 10, 1864, the original members of the regiment were ordered back into Illinois. The regiment was mustered out on July 7, 1864. Its veterans and recruits were transferred to the 42nd Illinois Volunteer Infantry Regiment.

== Total strength and casualties ==
The regiment suffered 2 officers and 145 enlisted men who were killed in action or who died of their wounds, and 2 officers and 101 enlisted men who died of disease, for a total of 250 fatalities.

== Commanders ==
- Colonel Henry Dougherty - discharged due to wounds on May 7, 1863.
- Lieutenant Colonel Harrison E. Hart - commanded at the Battle of Belmont, Missouri, November 7, 1861
- Lieutenant Colonel Francis Swanwick - mustered out with the regiment.

== See also ==
- List of Illinois Civil War Units
- Illinois in the American Civil War
