= 100th Illinois Infantry Regiment =

100th Illinois Volunteer Infantry Regiment
- Illinois state flag
- Active: August 30, 1862 – June 15, 1865
- Disbanded: June 15, 1865
- Country: United States
- Allegiance: Union
- Branch: Infantry
- Engagements: American Civil War: Skirmish at Bardstown Kentucky; Skirmish at Lavergne; Battle of Stone's River; Battle of Chickamauga; Siege of Chattanooga; Battle of Missionary Ridge; Battle of Rocky Face Ridge; Battle of Resaca; Battle of Kennesaw Mountain; Battle of Jonesborough; Battle of Franklin; Battle of Nashville

Commanders
- Notable commanders: Frederick A. Bartleson

The 100th Regiment Illinois Volunteer Infantry was an infantry regiment that served in the Union Army during the American Civil War.

== Service ==
The 100th Illinois Infantry was organized at Joliet, Illinois, By Colonel Frederick A. Bartleson and mustered into Federal service on August 30, 1862.

The Regiment's First Battle was a Skirmish at Bardstown Kentucky, Where it was ordered by General Haskell To make a Charge, The Regiment yelled and Charged Forward, Driving the enemy through the Town and Two miles Beyond.

The Regiment took part in the battle of Stone's River, where it gallantly charged at the Confederates after being held in reserve, Holding their ground without Protection, And the Confederates Fell back under the cover of the breast works, The Regiment Suffered 24 Killed and 80 Wounded, and the next day, after a desperate Charge, Colonel Frederick A. Bartleson and 14 Men were Captured.

The next battle they took part was at Missionary Ridge, where it was on the left of Sheridan's Division, The regiment charged directly in front of Orchard's Knob, then carried the Ridge, capturing many prisoners and a Confederate Battery, Pursuing the enemy far into the night, Driving the Confederates across the Chickamauga River.

The regiment was mustered out on June 12, 1865, and discharged at Chicago, Illinois, on June 15, 1865.

== Total strength and casualties ==
The regiment suffered 7 officers and 73 enlisted men who were killed in action or who died of their wounds and 134 enlisted men who died of disease, for a total of 214 fatalities.

== Commanders ==
- Colonel Frederick A. Bartleson - killed in action at the Battle of Kennesaw Mountain on June 23, 1864.
- Lieutenant Colonel Charles M. Hammond - Mustered out with the regiment.

== See also ==
- List of Illinois Civil War Units
- Illinois in the American Civil War
