= 85th Illinois Infantry Regiment =

85th Regiment Illinois Volunteer Infantry
- Illinois flag
- Active: August 27, 1862, to June 5, 1865
- Country: United States
- Allegiance: Union
- Branch: Infantry
- Engagements: Battle of Perryville; Battle of Stone's River; Battle of Chickamauga; Siege of Chattanooga; Battle of Lookout Mountain; Battle of Missionary Ridge; Battle of Resaca; Battle of Kennesaw Mountain; Siege of Atlanta; Battle of Jonesboro; Battle of Bentonville

The 85th Regiment Illinois Volunteer Infantry was an infantry regiment that served in the Union Army during the American Civil War.

== Service ==
The 85th Illinois Infantry was organized at Peoria, Illinois and mustered into Federal service on August 27, 1862.

The regiment was mustered out on June 5, 1865.

== Total strength and casualties ==
The regiment suffered 4 officers and 86 enlisted men who were killed in action or who died of their wounds and 1 officers and 131 enlisted men who died of disease, for a total of 222 fatalities.

== Commanders ==
- Colonel Robert S. Moore - Resigned due to disability June 14, 1863.
- Colonel Caleb James Dilworth - Mustered out with the regiment.

== See also ==
- List of Illinois Civil War Units
- Illinois in the American Civil War
