= 84th Illinois Infantry Regiment =

84th Regiment Illinois Volunteer Infantry
- Illinois flag
- Active: September 1, 1862, to June 16, 1865
- Country: United States
- Allegiance: Union
- Branch: Infantry
- Engagements: Battle of Perryville; Battle of Stone's River; Battle of Chickamauga; Siege of Chattanooga; Battle of Lookout Mountain; Battle of Missionary Ridge; Battle of Resaca; Battle of Kennesaw Mountain; Siege of Atlanta; Battle of Franklin; Battle of Nashville

The 84th Regiment Illinois Volunteer Infantry was an infantry regiment that served in the Union Army during the American Civil War.

== Service ==
The 84th Illinois Infantry was organized at Quincy, Illinois and mustered into Federal service on September 1, 1862.

The regiment was mustered out on June 8, 1865, in Nashville, Tennessee and discharged on June 16, 1865.

== Total strength and casualties ==
The regiment suffered four officers and 120 enlisted men who were killed in action or died of their wounds and 1 officer and 144 enlisted men who died of disease, for a total of 269 fatalities.

== Commanders ==
- Colonel Lewis Henry Waters - Mustered out with the regiment.

== See also ==
- List of Illinois Civil War Units
- Illinois in the American Civil War
