= 74th Illinois Infantry Regiment =

74th Regiment Illinois Volunteer Infantry
- Illinois state flag
- Active: September 4, 1862, to June 10, 1865
- Country: United States
- Allegiance: Union
- Branch: Infantry
- Engagements: Battle of Perryville; Battle of Stone's River; Siege of Chattanooga; Battle of Kennesaw Mountain; Battle of Jonesboro; Battle of Franklin; Battle of Nashville

The 74th Regiment Illinois Volunteer Infantry was an infantry regiment that served in the Union Army during the American Civil War.

== Service ==
74th Regiment Illinois was organized at Rockford, Illinois and mustered into Federal service on September 4, 1862.

The regiment was discharged from service on June 10, 1865.

== Total strength and casualties ==
The regiment suffered 5 officers and 78 enlisted men who were killed in action or mortally wounded and 3 officers and 116 enlisted men who died of disease, for a total of 202 fatalities.

== Commanders ==
- Colonel Jason Marsh - Resigned August 24, 1864.
- Lieutenant Colonel Thomas J. Bryan - Mustered out with the regiment.

== See also ==
- List of Illinois Civil War Units
- Illinois in the American Civil War
