= 51st Illinois Infantry Regiment =

51st Regiment Illinois Volunteer Infantry "Chicago Legion"
- Illinois state flag
- Active: December 24, 1861 to September 25, 1865
- Country: United States
- Allegiance: Union
- Branch: Infantry
- Engagements: Battle of Island Number Ten; Battle of Stone's River; Battle of Chickamauga; Battle of Resaca; Battle of Kennesaw Mountain; Siege of Atlanta; Battle of Jonesboro; Battle of Franklin; Battle of Nashville

The 51st Regiment Illinois Volunteer Infantry was an infantry regiment that served in the Union Army during the American Civil War.

== Service ==
The 51st Illinois Infantry was organized at Chicago, Illinois and mustered into Federal service on December 24, 1861.

The regiment was mustered out on September 25, 1865.

== Total strength and casualties ==
The regiment suffered 9 officers and 106 enlisted men who were killed in action or mortally wounded and 1 officer and 134 enlisted men who died of disease, for a total of 250 fatalities.

== Commanders ==
- Colonel Gilbert W. Cumming - resigned on September 30, 1862.
- Colonel Luther P. Bradley - promoted brigadier general on July 30, 1864.
- Lieutenant Colonel Charles W. Davis - discharged June 30, 1865.
- Lieutenant Colonel James S. Boyd - mustered out with the regiment.

== See also ==
- List of Illinois Civil War Units
- Illinois in the American Civil War
- 51st Illinois Infantry: Letters, Diaries, History
