= James Hughes Stokes =

American Union Army brigadier general (1816–1890)

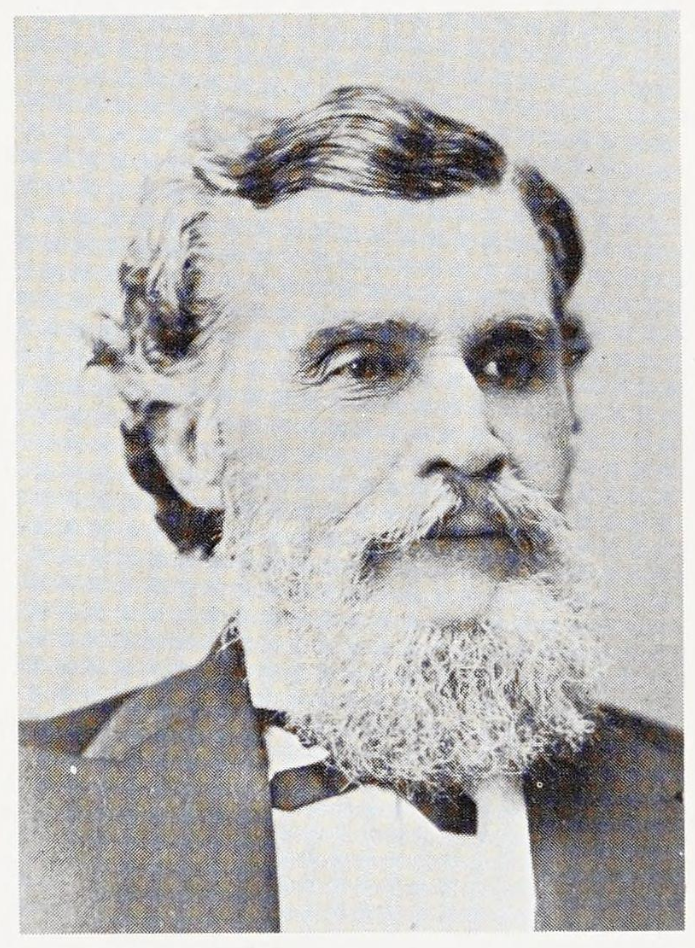
- Born: July 11, 1816; Havre de Grace, Maryland, U.S.
- Died: December 27, 1890 (aged 74); New York City, U.S.
- Burial place: Washington Street Cemetery in Ontario County, New York, U.S.
- Military career
- Allegiance: United States of America; Union
- Branch: United States Army; Union Army
- Service years: 1835–1865
- Rank: Brigadier General
- Conflicts: Second Seminole War; Battle of Lake Okeechobee; American Civil War; Battle of Perryville; Battle of Stones River; Chickamauga campaign; Battle of Chickamauga; Wheeler's October 1863 Raid; Battle of Farmington, Tennessee; Chattanooga campaign; Battle of Missionary Ridge

James Hughes Stokes (July 11, 1816 – December 27, 1890) was a Union Army officer who served as a brigadier general of volunteers during the American Civil War.

== Life ==
According to his obituary in The Inter Ocean, Stokes was born in Baltimore, in 1814, but Warner says he was "probably" born at Hagerstown, Maryland, in June 1815. In 1831 he was appointed to a cadet ship at the United States Military Academy at West Point, New York. He graduated in 1835, as 17th out of 56. Following service in the Seminole war, he received his commission as captain. In 1843 he resigned from the army, and from 1845 to 1858 was engaged in manufacturing and the railroad business. In 1859 he settled in Lake Forest, Illinois.

When the Civil War began in 1861, there was a general search for small arms to supply the growing army, and Illinois Governor Richard Yates wanted to mount an expedition to seize the United States small arms from Jefferson Barracks at St. Louis, but as the barracks were surrounded by rebels, who were determined to take the guns for their own use, many military men declined to undertake it; but Stokes offered to try and was successful, receiving the thanks of the Illinois legislature. On July 31, 1862, he was commissioned captain of Illinois volunteer artillery, and did notable service in the battles of Perryville, Chickamauga and Missionary Ridge, rising to the rank of lieutenant colonel in 1864. On August 22, 1864, he was demoted to captain and assistant adjutant general, for reasons unknown.

On July 20 or 22, 1865, just after the end of the war, he was made Brigadier general of Volunteers, and one month later he was mustered out of service. For about fifteen years he made Chicago his residence and place of business. He then removed to New York City, where he lived the rest of his life.

Stokes died at his home in New York in the night of December 27, 1890, after an illness of a few days. A week prior he had walked from his residence to the post office, and afterward contracted a cold, which developed into pneumonia. He left two sons, a daughter, and a widow, his second wife. The sons and daughter were then living in Chicago.

== See also ==
- List of American Civil War generals (Union)

== Bibliography ==
- Burley, Augustus Harris (1892). The Cairo Expedition: Illinois' First Response in the late Civil War · The Expedition from Chicago to Cairo. Fergus Printing Co. pp. 7–12.
- McIlvaine, Mabel (1914). Reminiscences of Chicago during the Civil War. R. R. Donnelley & Sons Co. pp. 60–64.
- Cullum, George W. (1891). Biographical Register of the Officers and Graduates of the United States Military Academy, Volume 1 (3rd ed.). New York: D. Van Nostrand.
- Warner, Ezra J. "James Hughes Stokes". Generals in Blue: Lives of the Union Commanders. Louisiana State University Press. pp. 478–479.
- "General J. H. Stokes". The Inter Ocean. December 28, 1890. p. 3.
