= XXI Corps (Union army) =

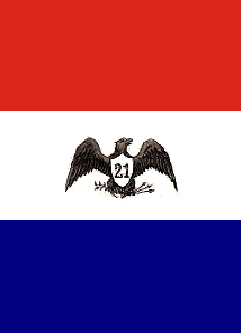
- XXI Corps headquarters badge
- Active: 1862–1863
- Country: United States of America
- Branch: Union Army
- Type: Army Corps
- Size: Corps
- Part of: Army of the Cumberland
- Engagements: American Civil War: Battle of Stone's River; Tullahoma Campaign; Battle of Chickamauga

Commanders
- Notable commanders: Thomas L. Crittenden

Insignia
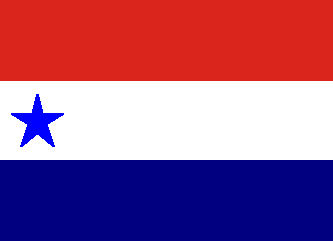
- 1st Division

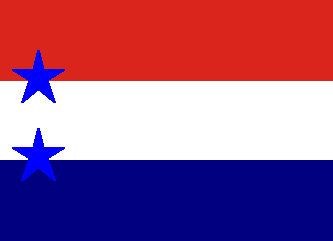
- 2nd Division

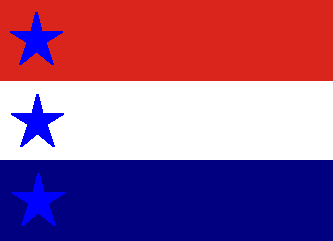
- 3rd Division

XXI Corps was a corps of the Union Army during the American Civil War. It served as part of William S. Rosecrans's Army of the Cumberland and was in existence from January 9 to October 1863.

After the Battle of Stone's River, General Rosecrans reorganized the "wings" of his army into three corps. The left wing, under Thomas L. Crittenden, became the XXI Corps.

Taking part in the Tullahoma Campaign, the XXI Corps was heavily engaged at Chickamauga on September 19–20, 1863, where it was nearly destroyed. It was Rosecrans' mistaken decision to pull Thomas Wood's division of this corps to support George Thomas's XIV Corps that resulted in General James Longstreet's breakthrough against the Union center. It should be added, though, that elements of XXI Corps, most notably William J. Palmer's division, aided Thomas in his successful rearguard action on Snodgrass Hill. Along with the remnants of XX Corps, the corps reorganized into IV Corps shortly after the battle.
