= Army of the Cumberland =

Union army unit in the American Civil War

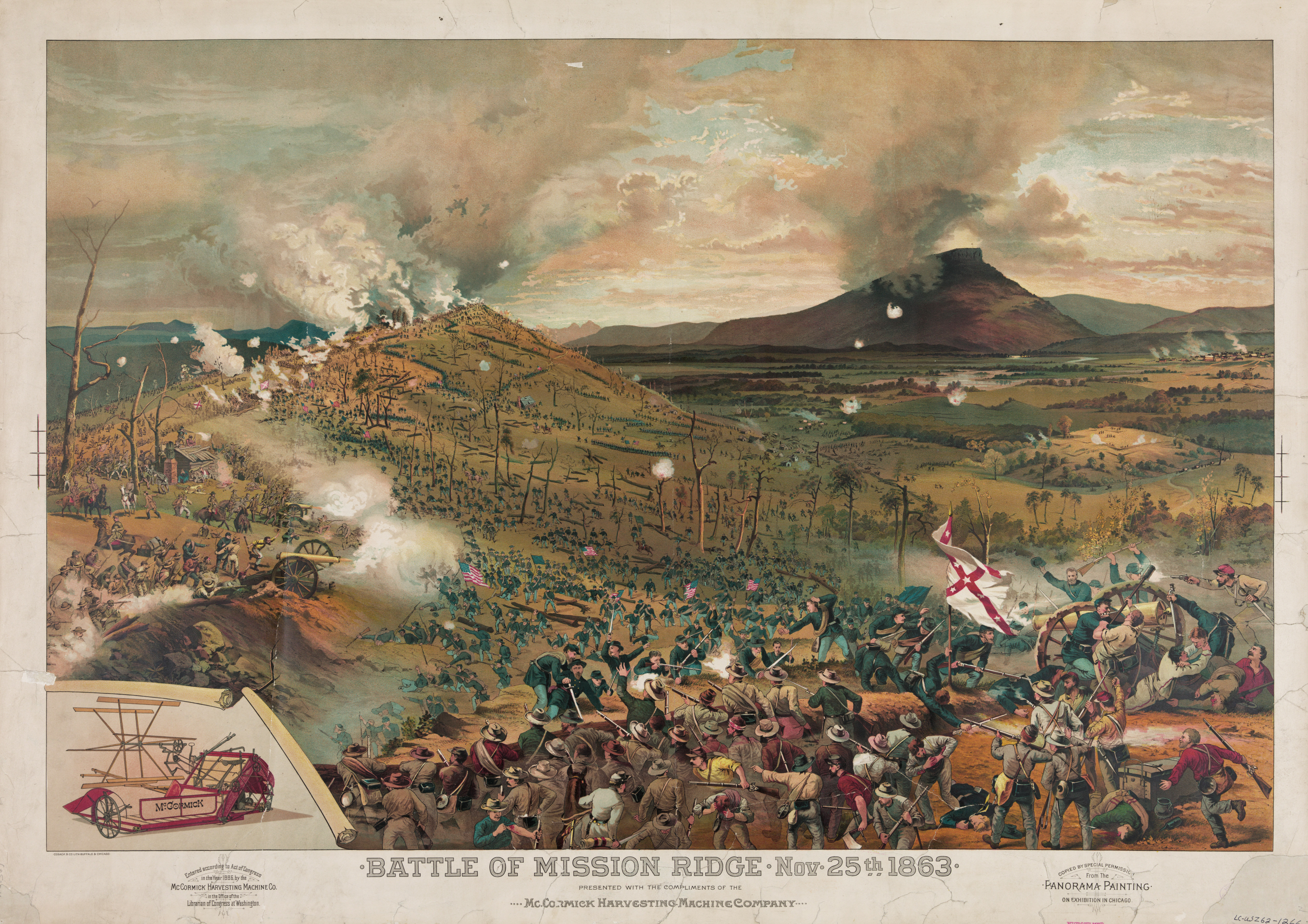
- Battle of Missionary Ridge
- Active: October 24, 1862 – August 1, 1865
- Country: United States
- Branch: United States Army
- Type: Field army
- Engagements: American Civil War: Battle of Stones River; Tullahoma Campaign; Battle of Chickamauga; Chattanooga campaign; Atlanta campaign; Franklin–Nashville Campaign

Commanders
- Notable commanders: William S. Rosecrans; George H. Thomas; Robert Anderson

The Army of the Cumberland was one of the principal U.S., or Union, armies in the Western Theater during the American Civil War. Named for the Cumberland River, it was originally known as the Army of the Ohio.

== History ==
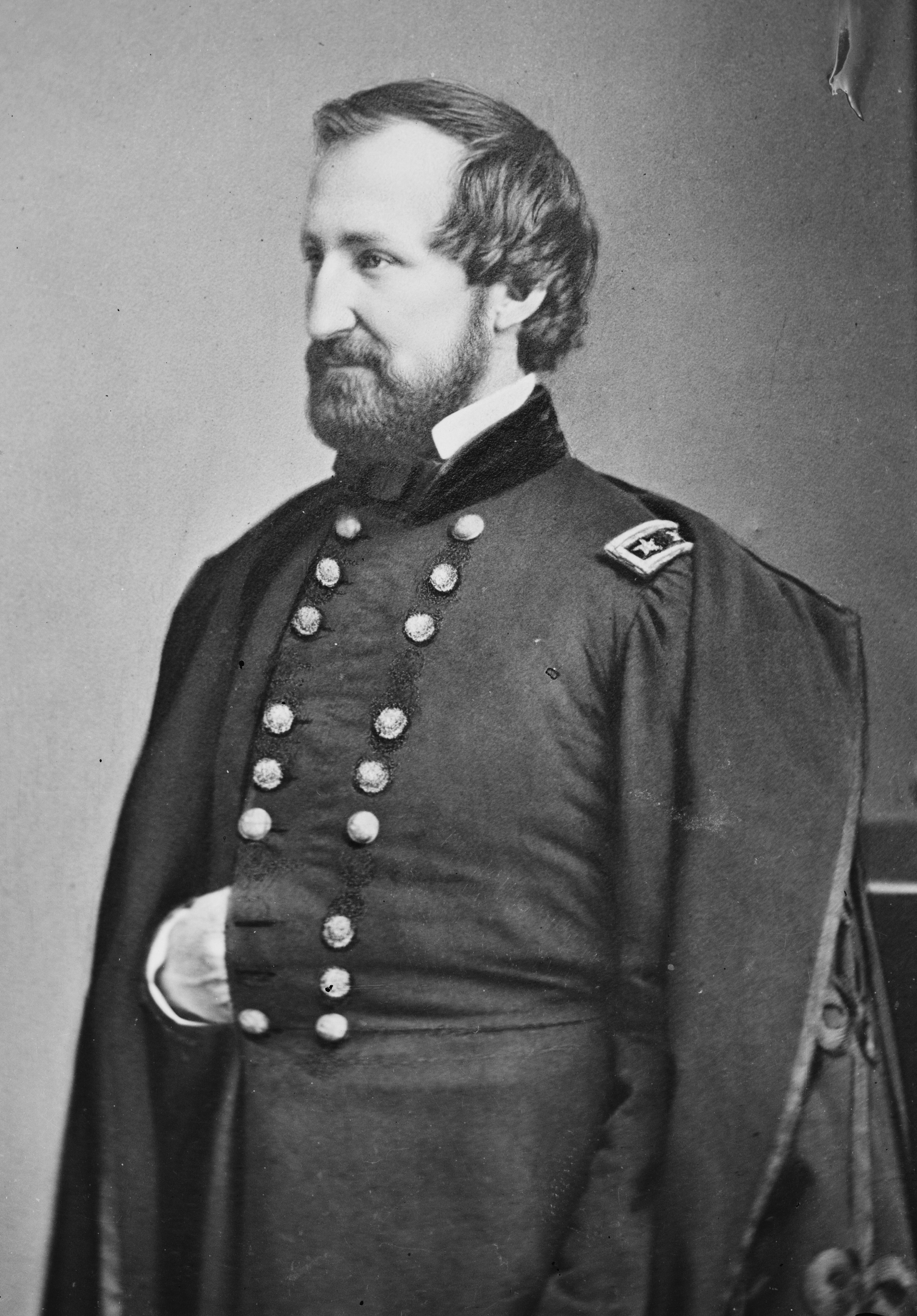
Maj. Gen. William S. Rosecrans

The origin of the Army of the Cumberland dates back to the creation of the Army of the Ohio in November 1861, under the command of Brig. Gen. Robert Anderson. The army fought under the name Army of the Ohio until Maj. Gen. William S. Rosecrans assumed command of the army and the Department of the Cumberland and changed the name of the combined entity to the Army of the Cumberland. When Rosecrans assumed command, the army and the XIV Corps were the same unit, divided into three "grand divisions" (wings) commanded by Alexander McCook (right wing), George H. Thomas (Center), and Thomas L. Crittenden (Left).

General Order No. 168 was the order passed by the Union Army on October 24, 1862, that called for commissioning the XIV Corps into the Army of the Cumberland.

The army's first significant combat under the Cumberland name was at the Battle of Stones River. After the battle the army and XIV Corps were separated. The former Center wing became XIV Corps, the Right wing became XX Corps, and the Left wing became XXI Corps. Rosecrans still retained command of the army. He next led it through the Tullahoma Campaign and at the Battle of Chickamauga, after which the army became besieged at Chattanooga. Maj. Gen. Ulysses S. Grant arrived at Chattanooga. Reinforcements from the Army of the Potomac and the Army of the Tennessee also arrived. Rosecrans had been a popular and respected commander, but because of his defeat at Chickamauga and inability to lift the Confederate siege, Grant chose to replace him with George H. Thomas on October 19, 1863.

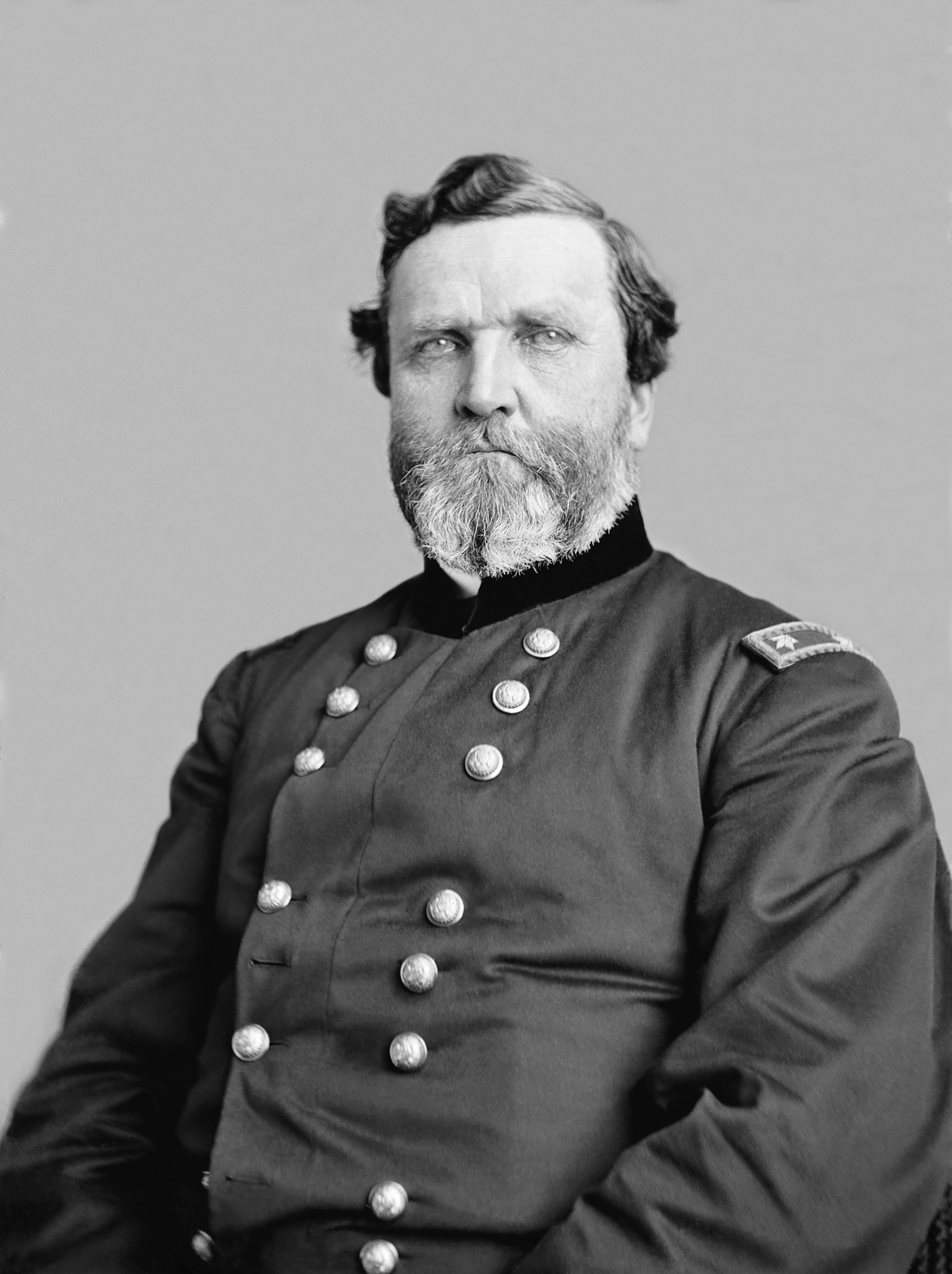
Maj. Gen. George H. Thomas

In the Battles for Chattanooga, Grant had been leery of using the Army of the Cumberland in the main fighting, fearing their morale to be too low after the defeat at Chickamauga. Instead, he used the veterans from the Army of the Potomac, proud of their recent victory at the Battle of Gettysburg, to take Lookout Mountain and planned to use the troops from the Army of the Tennessee, also recent victors at the Siege of Vicksburg, to attack the Confederate right flank on Missionary Ridge. The Army of the Cumberland was given the minor task of seizing the rifle pits at the base of Missionary Ridge. However, once they achieved their objective, four divisions (one led by Philip H. Sheridan) stormed up the ridge and routed the Confederate center. When Grant angrily asked who had ordered those troops up the ridge both Thomas and Gordon Granger, a corps commander in the army, responded they did not know. Granger then added, "Once those boys get started, all hell can't stop 'em."

After Grant's victory at Chattanooga earned him promotion to general-in-chief of the U.S. Army, Maj. Gen. William T. Sherman assumed command of Grant's Military Division of the Mississippi, which controlled all Union armies in the West. He created an "army group" of the Army of the Cumberland, the Army of the Tennessee, and the Army of the Ohio and marched towards Atlanta in May 1864. On the way to Atlanta they fought in many battles and skirmishes including the Battle of Kennesaw Mountain. In September, Atlanta fell to Sherman's army group. When Confederate general John B. Hood moved north from Atlanta, Sherman chose not to follow him and instead dispatched some of the Army of the Cumberland (IV Corps and Provisional Detachment) and the Army of the Ohio (XXIII Corps) after him. Thomas finally met Hood at the Battle of Nashville and crushed him, thus bringing to an end any significant military actions for the Army of the Cumberland. Other elements of the Army of the Cumberland (the XIV and XX Corps) marched to the sea and north through the Carolinas with Sherman, under the command of Maj. Gen. Henry W. Slocum. These forces became the Union's Army of Georgia and participated in the Grand Review of the Armies in Washington, D.C., before President Andrew Johnson in 1865.

== Command history ==
Commander	From	To	Major Battles and Campaigns
Major General William S. Rosecrans	October 24, 1862	October 19, 1863	Stones River, Tullahoma Campaign, Chickamauga
Major General George H. Thomas	October 19, 1863	August 1, 1865	Chattanooga, Atlanta campaign, Franklin, Nashville

== Orders of battle ==
- Stones River Union order of battle
- Chickamauga Union order of battle
- Chattanooga-Ringgold Campaign Union order of battle
- Atlanta Campaign Union order of battle
- Peachtree Creek Union order of battle
- Nashville Union order of battle
