= Henry B. Mattingly =

Union Army Medal of Honor recipient

Henry Benedict Mattingly
- Born: May 6, 1844; Saint Mary, Kentucky
- Died: November 30, 1893 (aged 49); Shepherdsville, Kentucky
- Burial place: Lebanon Junction Cemetery, Lebanon Junction, Kentucky
- Military career
- Allegiance: United States of America, Union
- Branch: United States Army, Union Army
- Service years: 1861–1865
- Rank: Private
- Units: Company B, 10th Regiment Kentucky Volunteer Infantry
- Conflicts: Battle of Mill Springs; Siege of Corinth; Battle of Perryville; Tullahoma Campaign; Chattanooga campaign; Battle of Chickamauga; Battle of Missionary Ridge; Atlanta campaign; Battle of Peachtree Creek; Battle of Resaca; Battle of Kennesaw Mountain; Siege of Atlanta; Battle of Jonesborough
- Awards: Medal of Honor

Henry Benedict Mattingly (May 6, 1844 – November 30, 1893) was a Union Army soldier in the American Civil War and a recipient of the United States military's highest decoration, the Medal of Honor, for his actions at the September 1, 1864, Battle of Jonesborough, Georgia.

== Biography ==
Mattingly joined as a private in Company B, 10th Regiment Kentucky Volunteer Infantry, recruited and initially commanded by John Marshall Harlan, on October 12, 1861, at age seventeen for a three-year term, mustering into U.S. service a little more than a month later on 21 November 1861. He would serve with his regiment in the Army of Ohio and the Army of the Cumberland until mustering out with the regiment on December 6, 1864.

=== Service ===
==== 1862 ====
The 10th were armed with the Model 1842 smoothbore musket, trained, and organized itself at Lebanon, Kentucky from the mustering date until January 1862 when it moved east to stop the ongoing Confederate offensive campaign in eastern Kentucky. Mattingly and his regiment were serving as supply train escorts while the rest of the 2nd Brigade of the Army of Ohio won the Battle of Mill Springs on January 19. Although ordered forward to rejoin the army on 17 January, the 10th's reunion with its brigade was slowed by impassably muddy roads. Arriving after the Rebel retreat had begun, the 10th was sent in pursuit. The next day, Mattingly and the 10th were the first troops into the hastily evacuated Confederate cm where they captured a dozen pieces of artillery and large amounts of arms and equipment.

The victory at Mill Springs was followed soon after by the fall of Forts Henry and Donelson, and the Confederate retreat of the from Kentucky. From Mill Spring the 10th marched to Louisville. From Louisville it went by steamboat down the Ohio, and up the Cumberland to Nashville, and from Nashville it marched to Pittsburg arriving after the Battle of Shiloh. Mattingly as a member of the regiment spent May in the Siege of Corinth and spent June through August in Buell's Campaign in Northern Alabama and Middle Tennessee that eventually threatened the important transportation hub of Chattanooga.

The Confederacy wanted to relieve the pressure on Vicksburg and Chattanooga, so Braxton Bragg decided to invade Kentucky hoping to reclaim it for the rebellion. Mattingly in Company B was in the garrison at Winchester, Tennessee, when it joined Buell's army marching to Kentucky to oppose Bragg. Rebel invasion culminated in the Union tactical defeat but strategic victory at Perryville. At the time of the battle, the 10th commanded by LTCOL Hays in BG Fry's 2nd Brigade, BGEN Schoepf's 1st Division of MGEN Gilbert's III Corps. The brigade did not become engaged in the battle, but when Bragg failed to follow up MGEN Polk's success, the brigade was part of the pursuit of the Rebels of the state and then marched to Gallatin, Tennessee, twenty miles northeast of Nashville on the north side of the Cumberland River.

Although Perryville was a strategic victory for the Union, Buell was subsequently relieved, and MGEN William S. Rosecrans was appointed to command the Army of Ohio and the Department of the Cumberland. He subsequently renamed his forces the Army of the Cumberland. The 10th remained in Gallatin into January 1863. On December 7, 1862, the brigade marched fifteen miles east to Hartsville, in response to Morgan's attack. Mattingly's unit reached the battlefield in time to observe the last of Morgan's troops, but too late to rescue the captured garrison. They arrived in time to save much property, including several hundred guns and a large amount of cartridges. These arms were un-issued Springfield Model 1861 rifled muskets. Since the 10th had "arms which were, in many respects defective, and in some respects entirely useless", Mattingly and his comrades turned their weapons in to the supply officers and replace them with the new .58 caliber Springfields which extended their firepower to several hundred yards.

While the Army of the Cumberland was embarking on the Stones River Campaign, Mattingly's regiment was sent north two weeks later into Kentucky to chase down Morgan who had raided deep into Kentucky. Mattingly and his comrade's rode the railroad from Gallatin to near Munfordville, from where they force-marched through Elizabethtown in time to catch Morgan's force on the Rolling Fork, December 29 near Lebanon Junction. This area was home to many of Mattingly's comrades. Despite being slightly outnumbered by Morgan's force, Mattingly's brigade was concentrated and Harlan effectively used it to surprise Morgan's scattered cavalry and drive them off.

==== 1863 ====
Mattingly and his comrades spent the winter and spring of 1863 based in and around the Army of the Cumberland's base at Murfreesboro. The regiment continued to gain experience escorting logistics trains and fending off both regular and irregular Rebel cavalry raids. Mattingly's regiment saw the departure of its commissioning commander, COL Harlan, who resigned due to family commitments. As a member of the Army of the Cumberland, Mattingly would spend 1863 in Eastern Tennessee and Georgia as part of the U.S. plan to liberate the region and control the important rail hub of Chattanooga to greatly complicate the Confederacy's logistical support to their war effort. (Note: The East Tennessee, Virginia and Georgia Railway connected Knoxville and Chattanooga, the Memphis and Charleston Railroad connected Memphis and Chattanooga, and the Nashville and Chattanooga Railroad connected Nashville and Chattanooga.)

===== The Tullahoma campaign =====
In the Tullahoma campaign, the 10th was in the 2nd Brigade (BGEN Steedman)of the 3rd Division (BGEN Brannan) of MGEN Thomas's XIV Corps. The Tullahoma campaign was marked by Rapid movement by the Army of the Cumberland facilitated by its increased cavalry and added mounted infantry such as Wilder's Lightning Brigade. XIV Corps advanced on 24 June to seize Hoover's Gap. Wilder outstripped the rest of XIV Corps (including the 10th that was bogged down in heavy rain and muddy roads at the rear of the corps' line of march). When Wilder surprised the Rebels and drove them through the length of the gap, he disobeyed his orders to hold his position at initial contact to wait for the rest of the corps. Instead, he took up defensive positions on the far southeastern entrance of the gap and with his overwhelming firepower due to his new Spencers, held off Confederate attempts to retake the gap until reinforced by oncoming elements of the corps. As such, the XIV Corp advance was so slowed by the rains that the 10th and its brigade arrived at the gap on 25 June in the afternoon and were ordered through to Garrison's Creek ten miles to the south to turn the Rebel left flank. The 10th saw some light skirmishing on the right flank as the Rebels were repulsed in their own attempt at flanking the 3rd Division's left flank. The 10th pushed forward the next day and by the 3rd of July, the Rebels had fled Tullahoma. In the action, Mattingly and his comrades lost one man.

===== The Chickamauga campaign =====
Through the summer, Mattingly and the 10th were pulled back to garrison various locations that had been abandoned by the Rebels in middle Tennessee until August 16, when it rejoined. On that date, Rosecrans launched his campaign of maneuvering to force Bragg out of Chattanooga without a pitched battle. It worked brilliantly. The 10th, now part of COL Croxton's 2nd Brigade of Brannan's 3rd Division of XIV Corps, moved across the Tennessee near the mouth of Battle Creek fifteen miles upstream from the rest of XIV Corps toward Chattanooga. Brannan's division crossed the river with 1st Brigade (COL Connell) on August 29, but they encountered no opposition as they swam the river, pushing their bundles of clothing and equipment on logs or other pieces of wood in front of them. After they had ensured that there were no Rebels around the crossing point, on 31 August, COL Van Derveer's 3rd Brigade, the three divisional artillery batteries, and Mattingly within Croxton's 2nd Brigade swam and rafted across. Once across, it concentrated with the rest of XIV Corps near Trenton, Georgia in position to move through Stevens' Gap to pursue Bragg's army.

After Negley's 2nd Division of XIV Corps fought with Cleburne's Division of D. H. Hill's Corps at Davis's Cross Roads on September 11, 1863, the Army of the Cumberland hurried to consolidate their vulnerable separated corps. Mattingly and the 10th began moving northeast toward Chickamauga Creek.

By 18 September, XIV Corps had moved northeast and was anchoring the Arm of the Cumberland's left at Lee and Gordon's Mill. As a result of delaying actions at Reed's and Alexander's Bridges across Chickamauga Creek, Rosecrans realized his left flank was exposed and Bragg was trying to get between him and his base at Chattanooga. Due to this XIV Corps was moved further north to Kelly's Field. Mattingly was with the 10th when their 2nd Brigade positioned on the right of Brannan's 3rd Division at the extreme left of the XIV Corps flank. Rosecrans had placed his reserve Corps under MGEN Granger two miles to the north of Thomas' XIV left end at McAfee's Church. Mattingly and his surviving mates were luckier than their comrades on the line . A cold front had come through and after a very warm day, the temperature dropped. Mattingly and the 10th were lucky to have fires. Those soldiers on or closer to the front line were could not light fires due to the close proximity of the two armies in the night.

====== The First Day ======
On the morning of 19 September, Brannan received word that Rebel cavalry from Forrest's Cavalry Corps had been separated from the main enemy body in the woods between Reed's Bridge and Alexander's Bridge Roads. Mattingly and his messmates received the word to fall in while they were still making their coffee and were a little disgruntled at having to eat on the move. As the 2nd Brigade moved forward to contact, the 10th in the second line was shifted to the extreme left of the brigade where it drove off Davidson's Cavalry Brigade of Pegram's Division under Forrest. The brigade was soon attacked by infantry from Walker's Reserve Corps. On the right of the brigade, the 74th Indiana found its right being outflanked by Rebels. Croxton pulled Mattingly's regiment from the other end of the brigade line at the double-quick to shore up his right. The 10th passed through and behind the 74th and face perpendicular to the original line catching the Rebels in the right flank and stopping them. The 74th regrouped and took the end of the right flank so that the brigade now formed an "L" shape in the woods with the 10th, 14th Ohio, and 74th in the stem and the 4th Kentucky and 10th Indian in the foot. In this position, the brigade fought fiercely resisting all Rebel attempts to shift it until they ran out of ammunition just before noon. BGEN John King's brigade of U.S. Army regulars relieved them.

The action had been quite heavy and Mattingly's Company B was in the thick of the fighting, losing more than twenty men in one hour of fighting the woods. The whole brigade withdrew a half mile out of the woods to La Fayette Road to replenish their ammunition. Once re-armed, they moved back to engage the enemy joining their division on its northern, left flank just to the right of Baird's 1st Division which was the new XIV left flank. Their new position was on the crest of a ridge a quarter-mile west of their original position in the woods.

Once again, the brigade repulsed attempts by Walker's Corps to break the Army of the Cumberland's line. By 14:00, they had again fired away all their ammunition, as had the rest of their division. This time, they were relieved in the line by Johnson's 2nd Division of McCook's XX Corps, and received direction from Brannan to withdraw west of La Fayette Road at the foot of Horseshoe Ridge to resupply.

While the division was resupplying, Baird's 1st Division was being steadily pressed back. By the time King's 3rd Brigade reached Brotherton Filed just east of La Fayette Road, it was flanked, overwhelmed and broke. Initially alerted, Mattingly and the 10th were kept below horseshoe ridge as Thomas chose the 92nd Illinois Mounted Infantry which had been detached from Wilder's Lightning Brigade in Reynolds'4th Division to act as a Corps quick reaction reserve. While Mattingly and his comrades looked on, the 92nd, three companies of whom were completely armed with Spencer rifles, (Note: The 92nd was not one of the original regiments in that mounted infantry brigade. They had joined the brigade July 10, 1863. In the next five weeks, the regiment mounted and re-armed. By the start of the Chickamauga campaign, all companies were mounted and companies D, E and F were fully armed with Spencer Rifles. The remaining companies had a handful of Spencer rifles, and a mix of breech-loading carbines (including Spencers, Henrys, Sharps, and Burnsides) and some of their originally issued Enfield muzzle-loaders. By the time of Chickamauga, the handful of men still armed with Enfields had been given revolvers to supplement their rifle-muskets.) successfully stopped the Confederates with their superior firepower.

It was by now 16:00, and the 10th were kept at the foot of the ridge as an ad hoc reserve. Mattingly and his regiment had just fought their first "real" battle and had acquitted themselves well. Mattingly and his regiment were moved further south back towards Lee & Gordon's Mill where they spent the cold night. Mattingly and his surviving mates were luckier than their comrades on the line . A cold front had come through and after a very warm day, the temperature dropped. Mattingly and the 10th were lucky to have fires. Those soldiers on or closer to the front line were could not light fires due to the close proximity of the two armies in the night.

====== The Second Day ======
At 03:00, on the morning of 20 September, Mattingly moved northeast with his regiment back to the ridge crest they had occupied the prior afternoon. All along the line, Federal troops were building ad hoc breastworks. After occupying the position for three hours, at 07:00, they were moved further left (North) so that they were on the right of the brigade on the left of the division.

At 09:00, the Rebels attacked. Initially, Mattingly's foes were Stewart's Division of Buckner's Corps, and Mattingly and his comrades held them at bay. Unknown to them, Rosecrans' misread of the tactical situation around 11:00 led to a gap opening in the Federal line at the other end of their division's line. Also, during the night, Bragg had reorganized his army into two wings under LTGEN Polk (right) and LTGEN Longstreet (left, including finally all of his command from Virginia), (Note: Longstreet's 12,000 troops had arrived piecemeal starting midafternoon on the 18th after a twelve-day 800-mile journey with fifteen different railroads. The original plan of four-days travel over five railroads and 540 miles had been scuttled by the Burnside's capture of Knoxville cutting the East Tennessee and Virginia Railroad. In contrast, Hooker's command traveled 1,200 miles from Virginia to Knoxville two weeks later with two corps of 20,000 men arriving intact with all arms and supplies.) and at 11:00, an attack column of Longstreet's veterans from the Army of Northern Virginia hit the gap and broke through the Federal line. The column under command of MGEN Hood poured through and caught Federal troops out of position on the march north from McCook's XX Corps to reinforce Thomas. As well as Stewart's troops to their front, Mattingly and his regiment soon had Law's Division flanking their right. As the other brigades in the division began to give way under the onslaught, Col Croxton ordered the brigade to fall back to Horseshoe Ridge. Executing a fighting withdrawal, the 10th was pushed back with the rest of the division to the crest of the ridge by the Snodgrass House.

On the ridge, Mattingly and the 10th, although having suffered heavy casualties, regrouped and replenished their ammunition which had almost run out during the withdrawal. The whole brigade was kept in reserve behind the developing Federal line on the ridge for the moment. While the Army of the Cumberland's right was collapsing and reeling back along the roads toward Chattanooga, Brannan kept a cool head and faced his division southeast at the foot of Horseshoe Ridge. After a brief respite, at 11:30, he called Croxton to bring his brigade back into line. Mattingly and his regiment were brought forward and place in line next to some artillery that formed below the ridge at the northern edge of Poe Field just inside the trees.

The brigade built breastworks again of whatever material they could find. The Army of Northern Virginia veterans kept coming in greater numbers. The 10th's brigade were soon hotly fighting BGEN Robertson's Arkansans and Texans as first, COL James L Sheffield's Alabamians, and then BGEN Benning's Georgians crossed the southern end of Poe Field below the brigade, presenting their right flank. The artillery opened fire to great effect. While Sheffield continued west pursuing the broken Federals, Benning turned to face Croxton's brigade, and attacked north across the field to add to the weight of Robertson. The action grew even hotter for Mattingly and his comrades as it neared noon.

At this point of the battle, Croxton was wounded and Mattingly's commander, COL Hays, had to assume command of the brigade. The 10th and the rest of the brigade broke under the weight of the two brigades attacking them and fell back in disarray up Horseshoe Ridge where the rest of XIV Corps and odd lots from XX and XXI Corps were forming a new line. (Note: The thickness of woods at the edge of the field combined with the noise and smoke to cause Mattingly's comrades in Company E to be left behind. Unaware of the departure of the rest of the regiment, they stayed on firing at the Rebels. Mistaken for Rebels, the company was approached by a mounted Confederate officer who ordered them to cease fire to avoid hitting their own men. When they realized that he was a Rebel, they managed to slip away and rejoin the regiment on the ridge to the north.) On the crest Hays was busy restoring order to the 14th Ohio and 4th Kentucky who had broken and streamed west to the ridge. Meanwhile, the 10th's new commander, LTC Wharton managed to rally the surviving members of the regiment, Mattingly included. Hays joined the 10th with the 10th and 74th Indiana and withdrew orderly north into Reynolds's division on Snodgrass Hill.

Brannan was organizing the units from his shattered division along the heavily wooded ridge. Brannan, with the assistance of COL Walker and future congressman BGEN John Beatty (who had assumed command of the division from MGEN Negley who suffering from dysentery and exhaustion was rendered completely ineffective (Note: Walker had been commanding Brannan's 1st Brigade, but had been put under arrest just prior to the initial contact on 18 September. His replacement, COL John M. Connell, was nowhere to be found, so Brannan wisely removed the arrest and had him take over his old brigade)) managed to construct a line along the ridge from the remnants of his and Negley's divisions. Mattingly and the 10th found themselves ordered to the middle, highest of three crests of Horseshoe Ridge. By 12:45, Mattingly was in a new Union line that was holding their position.

Brannan and the regiment fought on against the Rebel onslaught against Thomas' position holding Snodgrass Hill which now included some brigades and divisions from XX and XXI Corps. The remainder of the Army of the Cumberland had dissolved to the point that the only cohesive, intact unit remaining south of the 10th and the rest of Thomas' command was Wilder's which had seriously mauled the left flank of Longstreet's attack column due to the firepower.

From mid-afternoon to dusk, Mattingly was in the midst of Thomas' Snodgrass Hill/Horseshoe Ridge line as the Rebels continuously attacked. Starting about 16:30, Longstreet committed his last reserve, Preston's division to the battle, which made several attempts to assault Horseshoe Ridge (Note: Longstreet later wrote that there were 25 assaults in all on Snodgrass Hill, but historian Glenn Tucker has written that it was "really one of sustained duration". At that same time Thomas received an order from Rosecrans to take command of the army and began a general retreat. Thomas's divisions at Kelly field, starting with Reynolds's division, were the first to withdraw, followed by Palmer's.) As the Confederates saw the Union soldiers withdrawing, they renewed their attacks, threatening to surround Johnson's and Baird's divisions. Although Johnson's division managed to escape relatively unscathed, Baird lost a significant number of men as prisoners. Thomas left Horseshoe Ridge, placing Granger in charge, but Granger departed soon thereafter, leaving no one to coordinate the withdrawal. Maqttingly and the 10th managed to stealthily withdraw to the north with the rest of Brannan's division. Eventually all divisions managed to escape due to the sacrifice of three regiments—the 22nd Michigan, the 89th Ohio, and the 21st Ohio—who were left behind without sufficient ammunition, and ordered to use their bayonets. They held their position until surrounded by Preston's division, when they were forced to surrender.

====== Aftermath ======
Mattingly as part of Brannan's troops withdrew to positions around Rossville Gap during the night. Garfield met him Thomas in there and relayed to Rosecrans that "our men not only held their ground, but in many points drove the enemy splendidly. Longstreet's Virginians have got their bellies full." Although the troops were tired and hungry, and nearly out of ammunition, he continued, "I believe we can whip them tomorrow. I believe we can now crown the whole battle with victory." The two urged Rosecrans to rejoin the army and lead it, but a defeated Rosecrans remained in Chattanooga.

The Army of Tennessee camped on the battleground for the night, unaware that the Union army had slipped from their grasp. Bragg was not able to mount the kind of pursuit due to his army's exhaustion, the fact that Longstreet's divisions had arrived by rail without wagons to transport their supplies, and the high loss of the artillery horses injured or killed during the battle. Bragg also had no pontoon bridges to effect a crossing of the Tennessee. Bragg paused at Chickamauga to reorganize and gather equipment lost by the Union army. Although Rosecrans had been able to save most of his trains, large quantities of ammunition and arms had been left behind.

Mattingly's regiment withdrew from Rossville Gap with the rest of the Army of the Cumberland withdrew to the former Confederate fortifications around Chattanooga to build a strong defensive line. However, by doing so, Rosecrans yielded the surrounding heights to Bragg putting his supply lines into Chattanooga at risk. The Confederates soon occupied Lookout Mountain and Missionary Ridge and laid siege upon the U.S. forces.

Henry Mattingly and his comrades had survived their biggest battle yet. (Note: The battle was damaging to both sides in proportions roughly equal to the size of the armies: Union losses were 16,170 (1,657 killed, 9,756 wounded, and 4,757 captured or missing), Confederate 18,454 (2,312 killed, 14,674 wounded, and 1,468 captured or missing). They were the highest losses of any battle in the Western Theater during the war and, after Gettysburg, the second-highest of the war overall. Although the Confederates were technically the victors, Bragg failed to destroy Rosecrans or restore Confederate control of East Tennessee. Eicher and the McPhersons call it a "stunning tactical and strategic victory", but most historians see it as incomplete with the caveats of failed goals and in light of the steady stream of the Army of Tennessee's ensuing defeats.)

===== The Chattanooga campaign =====
Bragg, with a larger army than Rosecrans, was strongly fortified to the east, south, and west of Chattanooga. His positions commanded the river below. Practically the Army of the Cumberland was besieged. The Rebels, with Joseph Wheeler's cavalry roaming north of the Tennessee River, was frequently interrupting the Army of the Cumberland's supplies. Longstreet's corps holding Lookout and Raccoon mountains west of Chattanooga, commanded the railroad, the river, and the shortest and best wagon roads both south and north of the Tennessee, between Chattanooga and the railhead at Bridgeport (even the road that ran along the north bank of the river), a distance of twenty-six miles by rail.

Due to this situation, all supplies for Chattanooga had to be hauled by the Anderson road, a circuitous route, north of the river, over mountainous country, increasing the distance to over sixty miles. The region along the road became so exhausted of food for the cattle that by the time they reached Chattanooga they were in as bad condition as the animals already there. Nothing could be transported but food, and Mattingly and his brethren were without sufficient shoes or clothing for the coming winter. There was a single supply line open that snaked nearly 60 miles over rough terrain from Bridgeport, Alabama to the north, across rough terrain to the east, and came down to the city from the north. Supplying an army during good weather on this road was an ordeal, even with the mule teams in good condition, but with the rainy season that soon set in, and the incessant hauling wearing out the mules, the army's daily rations were constantly dwindling. The unpaved road was significantly worsened by heavy autumn rains that began in late September.

Starting with a tropical storm from September 28 to October 1, Mattingly and the besieged garrison endured eighteen periods of significant rainfall until the end of October. Twelve to eighteen inches of standing water were reported in the trenches of Chattanooga's defenses. As the ordeal continued, the 10th Kentucky saw on average 20 percent of the army reported sick on any given day of the siege. The large number of army horses and mules in the city generated 570,000 pounds of manure daily. Forty-thousand gallons of urine per day soaked encampments and contaminating sources of water. Disease, filth, and contamination were everywhere. The siege induced acute malnutrition also increased vitamin-induced disease rates. Toward the end of October, Mattingly and his brethren's typical rations were "four cakes of hard bread and a quarter pound of pork" every three days. While Mattingly and the bulk of the army were suffering, cavalry and mounted infantry were able to get out to forage and replenish their horses.

Mattingly and his comrades began to feel the effect of extremely short rations and many of their horses and mules died. On October 2, Wheeler made a devastating attack on a ten-mile long Union wagon train. This loss in wagons, with the roads becoming almost impassable by reason of the heavy rains and the growing weakness of the animals, lessened daily the amount of supplies brought into the town, so that suddenly, Mattingly's and his comrades long term survival in serious doubt. This was what Bragg was quietly waiting for. To supply an army some forty thousand strong, by wagon transportation over rough mountain roads a distance of sixty miles, Bragg knew was an impossibility, and that unless other lines were opened up, the city would be his at minimum cost.

As the siege set in, Rosecrans reorganized his army to counter the losses from Chickamauga moving the 10th Kentucky to the 3rd Brigade of the 2nd Division of XIV Corps.

The United States high command began immediate preparations to relieve the city. Only hours after the defeat at Chickamauga, Secretary of War Edwin M. Stanton ordered Maj. Gen. Joseph Hooker to Chattanooga. On September 24, Joseph Hooker had been detached from the Army of the Potomac with the 2nd and 3rd divisions (Steinwehr's and Schurz's) of XI Corps and XII Corps. Hooker and his troops traveled, within twelve days, from the Army of the Potomac on the Rappahannock via the U.S. railroads to the Tennessee River at Bridgeport, without an accident or detention. (Note: The efficiency of the United States' railroads over the Confederacy's effectively canceled the normal advantage of interior lines of communications that the Rebels possessed. While traveling 400 miles further with slightly more than twice the number, the troops had taken the same time as Longstreet's troops who had arrived two weeks earlier still lacking arms and supplies.) (Note: To avoid placing an even greater logistic burden on the Army of the Cumberland, Hooker's force was kept at Bridgeport where they could be easily supplied from Nashville by railroad. Grant wrote, "Hooker had brought with him from the east a full supply of land transportation. His animals had not been subjected to hard work on bad roads without forage, but were in good condition.") Upon arrival, members of Hooker's command were stunned to see how hungry these units that made it out of Chattanooga were.

Even before the Union defeat, Maj. Gen. Ulysses S. Grant had been ordered to send his available force to assist Rosecrans, and it departed under his chief subordinate, Maj. Gen. William T. Sherman, from Vicksburg, Mississippi. On September 29, Stanton ordered Grant to go to Chattanooga himself via Louisville where he met Stanton and received command of the newly created Military Division of the Mississippi, bringing territory from the Appalachian Mountains to the Mississippi River under a unified command. On October 18 en route, he replaced Rosecrans with Thomas to command of the Army of the Cumberland. Grant arrived in Chattanooga on October 23.

While no longer acting with his former purpose and energy, before his relief, Rosecrans had begun developing a plan to reopen his supply lines with his chief engineer, Brig. Gen. "Baldy" Smith and Thomas. Grant met with Rosecrans at Stevenson rail junction after dark on October 21, where Rosecrans offered suggestions to relieve the siege including a plan to open a supply line down along the river. Grant wondered why Rosecrans had not implemented his own suggestions. After his debrief with Rosecrans, Grant's train then rolled on to Bridgeport. (Note: Kimmerly suggests that by this point he suffered from extreme sleep deficiency. Rosecrans's insomnia became chronic at Corinth, Stones River, Chickamauga, and during the siege.)

Assessing the situation, Grant developed four courses of action:

1. Opening supply lines to lift the siege.
2. Amassing forces.
3. Clearing the high ground
4. Attacking Bragg

====== Opening supply lines ======
Thomas and Smith had continued the planning they started under Rosecrans. Once he was apprised of Thomas' plan to reopen the supply lines, Grant gave the go ahead. The plan was to establish a crossing on the Tennessee River and link up with Hooker's troops coming to the city. The crux of the operation was a three-pronged attack that converge on Brown's Ferry. One prong would march across Moccasin point (on the U.S.-held north side of the river) and seize the east landing of the ferry. Another force would float down the river and land on the west landing. The third would be Hooker's force advancing up the railroad in Lookout Valley from Bridgeport.

Brown's Ferry

Brown's Ferry was opposite Moccasin Point where the road cut the foothills turning south to Wauhatchie Station and then west to Kelley's Ferry. There, they could establish a logistics head for Federal supply boats. Seizing Brown's Ferry and linking up with Hooker would create a reliable, efficient supply line (soon called the "Cracker Line"). In addition, a force at Brown's Ferry would threaten the right flank of any Rebel attempt to cut the line in Lookout Valley.

Braxton Bragg was unaware of the planned operation but had heard from scouts of Hooker's pending river crossing at Bridgeport. Concerned about his left flank, he ordered Longstreet to move additional units into Lookout Valley, but, unknown to Bragg, the order was ignored. Furthermore, Longstreet's lack of diligence allowed command mix ups to leave only two regiments near Brown's Ferry. The Rebels held Brown's Ferry with Oates' 4th Alabama of Law's undermanned Brigade of Hood's Division of Longstreet's Corps. This was deemed a weak link to be exploited. (Note: Longstreet's troops appear to have adopted the Army of Tennessee's dysfunctional divisiveness. Law had not seen properly to placing sufficient strength on the point as he was consumed in a bitter rivalry the division's other brigade commander.)

While Mattingly and his brigade remained in the fortifications, Smith took two infantry brigades (Hazen's and Turchin's) and the army's Engineer Brigade (COL Stanley). On October 26, Turchin moved across Moccasin Point to hold the east bank at Brown's Ferry. At 03:00 on October 27, Hazen ferried his brigade in pontoon boats manned by Stanley's engineers Hazen's force slipped around Moccasin Point past the Lookout Mountain pickets. Using the river's current for swift movement, an early morning fog helped cover their movements. The landing was made at ferry landing's west side at 05:00 in relative silence allowing U.S. troops to come ashore, drive off the Confederate pickets, and immediately begin entrenching. By dawn, company guarded the ferry itself, with five companies nearby in reserve.

Oates, a capable veteran of the Eastern Theater, upon learning of the U.S. presence, immediately counterattacked but was beaten back. When Oates was wounded, his men lost their nerve and started retreating. Simultaneously, Stanley's oarsmen began to ferry Turchin's men across the river. Hazen and Turchin's combined force now outflanked the Confederates, who retreated to the south toward Wauhatchie. The Army of the Cumberland's first real fighting since Chickamauga was finished within a half-hour with a victory that lifted the spirits of Mattingly and his comrades.

Oates had reported the landing of U.S. troops Law. His brigade commander blocked the road over Lookout Mountain with the rest of his brigade and reported the Union success to Longstreet. Longstreet dismissed the Union move to be only a feint and did not report it to Bragg as he was focused on a possible U.S. attack further to the southwest. When Bragg learned of it, he ordered Longstreet to retake the ground immediately, but Longstreet once again did nothing and Smith's men spent the day consolidating their bridgehead without interference. The pontoon bridge was completed by 16:30. Heavy rain returned late that evening and continued through the next morning, October 28.

Wauhatchie

The third prong, Hooker's column, at the same time, was advancing from Bridgeport, to reinforce Hazen if necessary. Hooker had left Maj. Gen. Henry W. Slocum with one of his divisions of to guard the railroad from Murfreesboro to Bridgeport while he sent Slocum's remaining division, under Geary, and Howard's XI Corps' two divisions to Lookout Valley. However, weather conditions delayed the movement, so Grant decided to move ahead with the Brown's Ferry operation even before Hooker could arrive.

Hooker's three Union divisions from Bridgeport by following the railroad via Shellmound and the Running Water Creek gorge. On October 28, after the rain had stopped, Bragg and Longstreet were having a conference on Lookout Mountain and while examining the U.S. position at Brown's Ferry, were interrupted by one of Longstreet's signal officers reporting the enemy advancing from Bridgeport. Turning to their left, they were astonished to see Hooker's column of 7,000 troops entering Lookout Valley. Due to his focus on further to the southwest, Longstreet's scouts had failed to detect Hooker's advance.

Hooker, while his force passed through Lookout Valley on October 28, detached Geary's division at Wauhatchie Station, a stop on the Nashville and Chattanooga Railroad, to protect the line of communications to the southwest as well as the road west to Kelley's Ferry. Meanwhile, Hooker's column marched through Lookout Valley and linked up with Hazen and Turchin at Brown's Ferry at 15:45, October 28. Thomas's staff began the preparations to bring supplies over the Cracker Line and he telegraphed General in Chief Henry W. Halleck that he expected "in a few days to be pretty well supplied". Once the line was open, "Hooker's dispositions were deplorable," with Howard's under strength XI Corps "bivouacked haphazardly" at Brown's Ferry. Worse, Geary's division, only 1,500-strong after detaching railroad guards, was posted in isolation.

Loath to attack the entrenched forces at Brown's Ferry, Longstreet spotted Geary's troops at Wauhatchie. Miffed at missing the chance to the ferry, Bragg ordered Longstreet to attack Geary instead. There, Hooker had neglected to arrange his force into effective defensive positions, instructing them merely to find good cover for the troops and bivouac. He detached Brig. Gen. John W. Geary's division at Wauhatchie Station, a stop on the Nashville and Chattanooga Railroad, to protect his links to the south and west.

Amazed to see Geary's bivouacking soldiers with their large wagon train parked directly in front of him, Longstreet ordered Jenkins to crush Geary with an attack that night. While Law took his own and Robertson's brigades to block Hooker from Geary, Bratton took Jenkins's South Carolina brigade to attack Geary. Originally planned for 22:00, October 28, confusion delayed the attack until midnight. Geary and his officers, despite expecting an attack were surprised by its suddenness and formed into a V-shaped battle line, facing north and east.

Hearing the sounds of battle, the XI Corps quickly fell into ranks near Brown's Ferry. Hooker ordered Schurz to Wauhatchie Station to reinforce Geary. In the confusion, von Steinwehr got his division on the road first. Smith's brigade of Steinwehr's division was fired on by Law's Confederates, positioned on a 200-foot (61 m) high blocking position above the road from Brown's Ferry. Smith climbed the hill to attack Law. Meanwhile, Hooker mistakenly deployed units from both XI Corps divisions against Law and Benning, leaving no one to go to Geary's aid. Law's outnumbered men held a strong hilltop position. In the darkness, Law repelled several vigorous assaults by Smith. After Law received some erroneous reports, he withdrew to Lookout Mountain, but as his men left their entrenchments, Smith's men spilled over them, capturing some stragglers and scattering a regiment that had not gotten the retreat order. Realizing no troops had gone to GBearym Hooker let Howard ride to Wauhatchie with some cavalry.

Geary continued to hold fast, though running low on ammunition, and just as Bratton began to sense victory, he received a note to retreat since Howard's relief force was arriving in his rear. Bratton also withdrew to Lookout Mountain, successfully covered by Benning's brigade. In the Wauhatchie fight, Bratton lost 356 men, while Geary's casualties numbered 216.

The lines open

In the city, Mattingly and his comrades heard of the arrival of supplies as its news spread quickly. The Army of the Cumberland had held out and was now receiving reinforcements and supplies. U.S. losses in the battle were 78 killed, 327 wounded, and 15 missing. The Rebels reported their losses as 34 killed, 305 wounded, and 69 missing. One account says Bratton lost 408 men while Law lost only 52. Geary reported burying 153 Confederates and capturing over one hundred prisoners, so the Confederate losses may have been over 900 men. The Union forces now had its link to the outside and could receive supplies, weapons, ammunition, and reinforcements via the Cracker Line. Grant could now amass forces to take back the initiative from Bragg. The Army of the Cumberland would soon be one of three U.S. field armies in the city.

Badly needed supplies began to flow in to Mattingly and the Army of the Cumberland. From October 28 to 30, skies cleared and roads began to show improvement easing the flow. By this time in late October many troops had nothing to eat for several days. Relieving troops saw the "half-famished" soldiers of the trapped army An added bonus was that in addition to opening an overland supply line of from Bridgeport to Chattanooga, the successful battle break the siege also opened the Tennessee River to logistic support from Bridgeport to Kelly's Ferry. Federals now controlled their line of communication.

The effect of the secure, reliable logistics support were such that Grant wrote:

It is hard for any one not an eye-witness to realize the relief this brought. The men were soon reclothed and well fed; an abundance of ammunition was brought up, and a cheerfulness prevailed not before enjoyed in many weeks. Neither officers nor men looked upon themselves any longer as doomed. The weak and languid appearance of the troops, so visible before, disappeared at once. I do not know what the effect was on the other side, but assume it must have been correspondingly depressing. Mr. Davis had visited Bragg but a short time before, and must have perceived our condition to be about as Bragg described it in his subsequent report. " These dispositions," he said, " faithfully sustained, insured the enemy's speedy evacuation of Chattanooga, for want of food and forage. Possessed of the shortest route to his depot and the one by which reinforcements must reach him, we held him at our mercy, and his destruction was only a question of time." But the dispositions were not " faithfully sustained", and I doubt not that thousands of men engaged in trying to " sustain " them now rejoice that they were not.

====== Amassing the forces ======
Even before he had taken command of the theater, Grant had been tasked to send help to Rosecrans. He detached Sherman and four divisions to go to Chattanooga. On October 3, they went upriver from Vicksburg to Memphis and then moved along the Memphis & Charleston Railroad. Grant tasked him to repair the rail line as he moved eastward. Due to the amount of repairs needed, it took six weeks before they arrived at Bridgeport. (Note: Sherman's four divisions totaled 17,000. He also brought all his wagon train, horse transport, and engineers.) Grant dedicated the line from Memphis to supplying Sherman and realized that he needed more repairs done on the rail lines to Nashville to be able supply Thomas, Hooker, and even Burnside in Knoxville who had no functioning railways available. He directed Sherman to send men from Bridgeport up the line to Nashville to make these repairs. (Note: This also included efforts to repair East Tennessee, Virginia and Georgia Railway connection to Knoxville.)

The defeat at Wauhatchie angered Bragg who placed the blame squarely on Longstreet and wanted to relieve him. When he asked permission from Davis to do so, Bragg suggested sending Longstreet and his corps of 15,000 troops and Wheeler's 5,000 cavalry to Knoxville to attack Burnside there and threaten Grant's left flank. Longstreet objected for two reasons, he felt his force was not sufficiently larger than Burnside's 12,000 infantry and 8,500 cavalry, and because it would weaken the forces against the city just as the U.S. forces were increasing. On November 4, Longstreet left the lines around Chattanooga to go against Burnside. (Note: Historians have called Bragg's detachment of Longstreet "..a substantial mistake" (Catton) and that after this "all the good opportunities were gone forever."(Catton) Grant knew immediately when Longstreet's troops were pulled from the Confederate lines and was able to plan accordingly.)

With the supply lines open, Grant was able to run supplies by wagons over the road to keep the starvation of the Army of the Cumberland at bay. By the second week of November, through a combination of the wagons and boats coming up river, he was able to bring in twice the logistics needed to sustain the U.S. troops. Mattingly and the other men in the Army of the Cumberland had been saved, but they were still far from ready for offensive operations. Grant planned on Thomas making a demonstration against Bragg's right flank the first week of November, but the still-weakened Army of the Cumberland was incapable of the endeavor. Thomas balked and suggested an attack on Bragg's left instead.

Thomas, Baldy Smith, and Brannan, now commanding the Army of the Cumberland's artillery conducted a reconnaissance on November 7 from the heights on the northern side of the Tennessee. Surprisingly, this expedition showed that the maps being used for planning were incorrect. They showed that he would need to move his artillery to support the attack. The party reported back to Grant that they would not be able to make the attack.

Grant was surprised by the intelligence, but Thomas suggested using Hooker's troops to clear Lookout Mountain to remove any threat to their supply lines. Grant accepted the suggestion and began re-planning their attacks. Grant and his staff assessed the situation and let the War Department know that nothing could be done to help Burnside until Sherman arrived.

For his part, Burnside, confident in his ability to defend himself, suggested that he pull all his forces between Chattanooga and Knoxville back to his fortifications in the city to draw Longstreet further away from his railhead at Loudon (Note: As East Tennessee was strongly loyal, local Unionist partisans had burned bridges between Loudon and Knoxville in 1861 and early 1862. The Confederacy hanged any local partisans that they captured. These actions severed the continuous rail link to Virginia which in turn, more than a year later, forced Longstreet and his force to take as long as Hooker's rail journey to go half as far.) to make it more difficult for him to return to Bragg when Grant attacked. Grant thought it a good move and okayed the plan. He then made plans to attack once Sherman and his force were in town and rested.

As Longstreet had stopped at Loudon until Friday, November 13 awaiting orders. As he left that location midday Friday, his force threatened Knoxville, but he could not return quickly to Chattanooga. On Saturday, Sherman reached Bridgeport in person checking in with Grant that evening. On Sunday, November 15, Sherman and his troops reached Chattanooga.

Grant's operational plan was already prepared, save the dates, before Sherman's arrival. With Sherman's arrival, Grant would have forces twice as large as Bragg's army trying to besiege them, and he could put together a timetable for the operation. Mattingly and his mates would play a supporting role in the upcoming actions with Sherman's Vicksburg veterans delivering a hammer blow on Patrick Cleburne's division on Bragg's right at the northern end of Missionary Ridge.

The last of Sherman's troops would arrive in the city Friday, November 20, so Grant planned on attacking the next day. As his plans went out to be implemented, the weather, specifically the rains upset the timetable. While Mattingly and his comrades were getting back to full strength in health, spirit, arms and equipment, Sherman's troops were being delayed by muddy roads and the fragility of the pontoon bridge at Brown's Ferry. Grant was forced to slide the schedule again to Monday, November 23. Although Grant had hoped to attack on Saturday, by Friday nightfall, November 20 only one of Sherman's brigades had crossed over Brown's Ferry and the attack had to be postponed. Grant was coming under increasing pressure from Washington to react to Longstreet's advance against Burnside at Knoxville.

Bragg, without his cavalry, lacked means of gathering intelligence and assumed that Sherman's corps would be heading toward Knoxville, not Chattanooga. Ergo, he expected Grant to fall on his left flank, Lookout Mountain. On November 12, Bragg placed Carter Stevenson in overall command for the defense of the mountain, with Stevenson's division placed on the summit. The brigades of Brig. Gens. John K. Jackson, Edward C. Walthall, and John C. Moore were placed on the "bench" of the mountain (a narrow and relatively flat shelf that wrapped around the northern end of the mountain approximately halfway to the summit). Thomas L. Connelly, historian of the Army of Tennessee, wrote that despite the imposing appearance of Lookout Mountain, "the mountain's strength was a myth. ... It was impossible to hold [the bench, which] was commanded by Federal artillery at Moccasin Bend." Although Stevenson placed an artillery battery on the crest of the mountain, the guns could not be depressed enough to reach the bench, which was accessible from numerous trails on the west side of the mountain.

Bragg weakened his position further on November 22, ordering Cleburne to withdraw his and Buckner's divisions from the line and march to Chickamauga Station, for railroad transport to Knoxville, removing 11,000 more men from the defense of Chattanooga. Bragg apparently believed, as Grant had hoped, Sherman was moving on Knoxville, which meant Longstreet would needed the reinforcements for which he had been constantly asking since he was first given the assignment.

====== Orchard Knob ======
On November 23, Mattingly and the 10th Kentucky saw columns of Cleburne's and Buckner's men marching away from Missionary Ridge and also heard claims from Confederate deserters that the entire army was going to retreat. Grant was afraid that Bragg would escape his grasp and that a reinforced Longstreet would become a viable threat to Burnside and Unionist East Tennessee, so he decided to disrupt the movement. He ordered Thomas to distract Bragg. Thomas sent Wood's3rd Division of Granger's IV Corps to advance in a reconnaissance in force, instructing him to avoid an engagement with the enemy and return to his fortifications when the strength of the Confederate line was revealed. Mattingly and the rest of Palmer's XIV Corps saw Wood's men assemble outside of their entrenchments. Their objective, approximately 2,000 yards to the east, was a small knoll 100 feet high known as Orchard Knob (also known as Indian Hill). Sheridan's 2nd Division lined up similarly to protect Wood's right flank, and Howard's XI Corps extended the line to the left, presenting over 20,000 soldiers arrayed in almost parade-ground alignment.

At 13:30, 14,000 Union soldiers moved forward at the double quick, sweeping across the plain, stunning the 600 Confederate defenders, who were able to fire only a single volley before they were overrun. Casualties were relatively small on both sides. Grant and Thomas decided to order the men to hold their position and entrench, rather than following the original orders to withdraw. Orchard Knob became Grant's and Thomas's headquarters for the remainder of the battles. Men of the Army of the Cumberland were elated at the success of their men. (Note: Grant did not move to Orchard Knob until 09:30, November 25.)

Bragg readjusting his strategy, quickly recalling all units that were within a day's march. Cleburne's division returned after dark from Chickamauga Station, interrupting the process of boarding the trains to Knoxville. Bragg reduced the strength on his left to strengthen his now vulnerable right. He assigned Hardee to command his now critical right flank, turning over the left flank to Carter Stevenson. In the center, Breckinridge ordered his men to fortify the crest of Missionary Ridge, a task that Bragg had somehow neglected for weeks. Unable to decide whether to defend the base or the crest of the Ridge, the divisions of Bate and Patton Anderson were ordered to move half of their divisions to the top, leaving the remainder in the rifle pits at the bottom. Historian James L. McDonough wrote of the upper entrenchments, "Placed along the physical crest rather than what is termed the military crest ... these works severely handicapped the defenders."

Grant also changed plans as a result. Sherman had three divisions ready to cross the Tennessee, but the pontoon bridge at Brown's Ferry had torn apart and Osterhaus's division was stranded in Lookout Valley. After receiving assurances from Sherman that he could proceed with three divisions, Grant decided to revive the previously rejected plan for an attack on Lookout Mountain and reassigned Osterhaus to Hooker's command.

====== Lookout Mountain ======
Battles for Chattanooga, November 24–25, 1863

Grant's battle plan of November 18 merely assigned Hooker the task of holding Lookout Valley. Six days later, however, Hooker had about 10,000 men in three divisions at his disposal, because Osterhaus's division could not cross the Tennessee due to disruption of the pontoon bridges. With Geary's and Cruft's (less one brigade) divisions, Hooker had too large a force to waste on guard duty. Thomas okayed a demonstration against the mountain, with the possibility of a full-scale assault. Hooker was ordered to "take the point only if his demonstration should develop its practicability." "Fighting Joe" ignored this subtlety and ordered Geary "to cross Lookout Creek and to assault Lookout Mountain, marching down the valley and sweeping every rebel from it."

While the advance of Cruft and Osterhaus demonstrated at Lookout Creek, Geary crossed the stream unopposed further south and found that the defile between the mountain and the river had not been secured. The Union troops were opposed by Brig. Gen. Walthall's brigade of Cheatham's division (temporarily under the command of Jackson). Geary swept northeast along the base of Lookout Mountain and pushed Walthall's completely outflanked and badly outnumbered men back to the Cravens House, just below the northern end of the mountain.

Brown's Rebel brigade on the mountain top were powerless to intervene in the battle raging below the cliffs. Geary's success allowed the other two divisions to cross the creek and push aside the Confederate skirmishers in front of them. Moore brought his Alabama brigade up around 13:00 to become embroiled in a fight with Geary and Whitaker's brigade of Cruft's division. Moore was pushed back and soon joined by Brig. Gen. Pettus's Alabama brigade.

By about 15:00, thick fog enveloped the mountain. Brig. Gen. Montgomery C. Meigs, quartermaster general of the Union Army, observing from Orchard Knob, was the first writer to name the action on Lookout Mountain the "Battle Above the Clouds". The two sides blazed away blindly in the fog the rest of the afternoon but few men were hit. During the fight, Hooker sent a stream of "alternate whimpering and blustering" messages to Grant, but got it exactly right when he predicted, "In all probability the enemy will evacuate tonight." Realizing the battle was lost, Bragg ordered the position abandoned. At midnight the fog cleared and, under a lunar eclipse, the divisions of Stevenson and Cheatham retreated behind Chattanooga Creek, burning the bridges behind them.

That night Bragg asked his two corps commanders whether to retreat or to stand and fight. Hardee counseled retreat, but Breckinridge convinced Bragg to fight it out on the strong position of Missionary Ridge. Accordingly, the troops withdrawn from Lookout Mountain were ordered to the right flank.

====== Missionary Ridge ======
(text)

==== 1864 ====
After Missionary Ridge.

=== Postwar ===
Mattingly received his medal in Kentucky on April 7, 1865. In 1867, he married Amanda Georgia "Mandy" Tucker. They had five children. He remained married to Mandy until his death in Shepherdsville, Kentucky, at age 49 in 1893.

== Medal of Honor citation ==
Mattingly' official Medal of Honor citation reads:

The President of the United States of America, in the name of Congress, takes pleasure in presenting the Medal of Honor to Private Henry B. Mattingly, United States Army, for extraordinary heroism on 1 September 1864, while serving with Company C, 10th Kentucky Infantry, in action at Jonesboro, Georgia, for capture of flag of 6th and 7th Arkansas Infantry (Confederate States of America).

== See also ==
- List of American Civil War Medal of Honor recipients
- 10th Kentucky Infantry Regiment
- Battle of Jonesborough
