= 31st Ohio Infantry Regiment =

- Active: August 4, 1861, to July 20, 1865
- Country: United States
- Allegiance: Union
- Branch: Union Army
- Type: Infantry
- Engagements: Siege of Corinth; Battle of Perryville; Battle of Stones River; Tullahoma Campaign; Battle of Chickamauga; Siege of Chattanooga; Battle of Missionary Ridge; Atlanta campaign; Battle of Resaca; Battle of Kennesaw Mountain; Siege of Atlanta; Battle of Jonesborough; Sherman's March to the Sea; Carolinas campaign; Battle of Bentonville

The 31st Ohio Infantry Regiment was an infantry regiment in the Union Army during the American Civil War.

== Service ==
The 31st Ohio Infantry Regiment was organized at Camp Chase in Columbus, Ohio and mustered in for three years service on August 4, 1861, under the command of Colonel Moses B. Walker.

The regiment was attached to Thomas' Command, Camp Dick Robinson, Kentucky, to November 1861. 12th Brigade, Army of the Ohio, to December 1861. 12th Brigade, 1st Division, Army of the Ohio, to January 1862. 1st Brigade, 1st Division, Army of the Ohio, to September 1862. 1st Brigade, 1st Division, III Corps, Army of the Ohio, to November 1862. 1st Brigade, 3rd Division, Center, XIV Corps, Army of the Cumberland, to January 1863. 1st Brigade, 3rd Division, XIV Corps, to July 1865.

The 31st Ohio Infantry mustered out of service at Louisville, Kentucky, on July 20, 1865.

== Detailed service ==
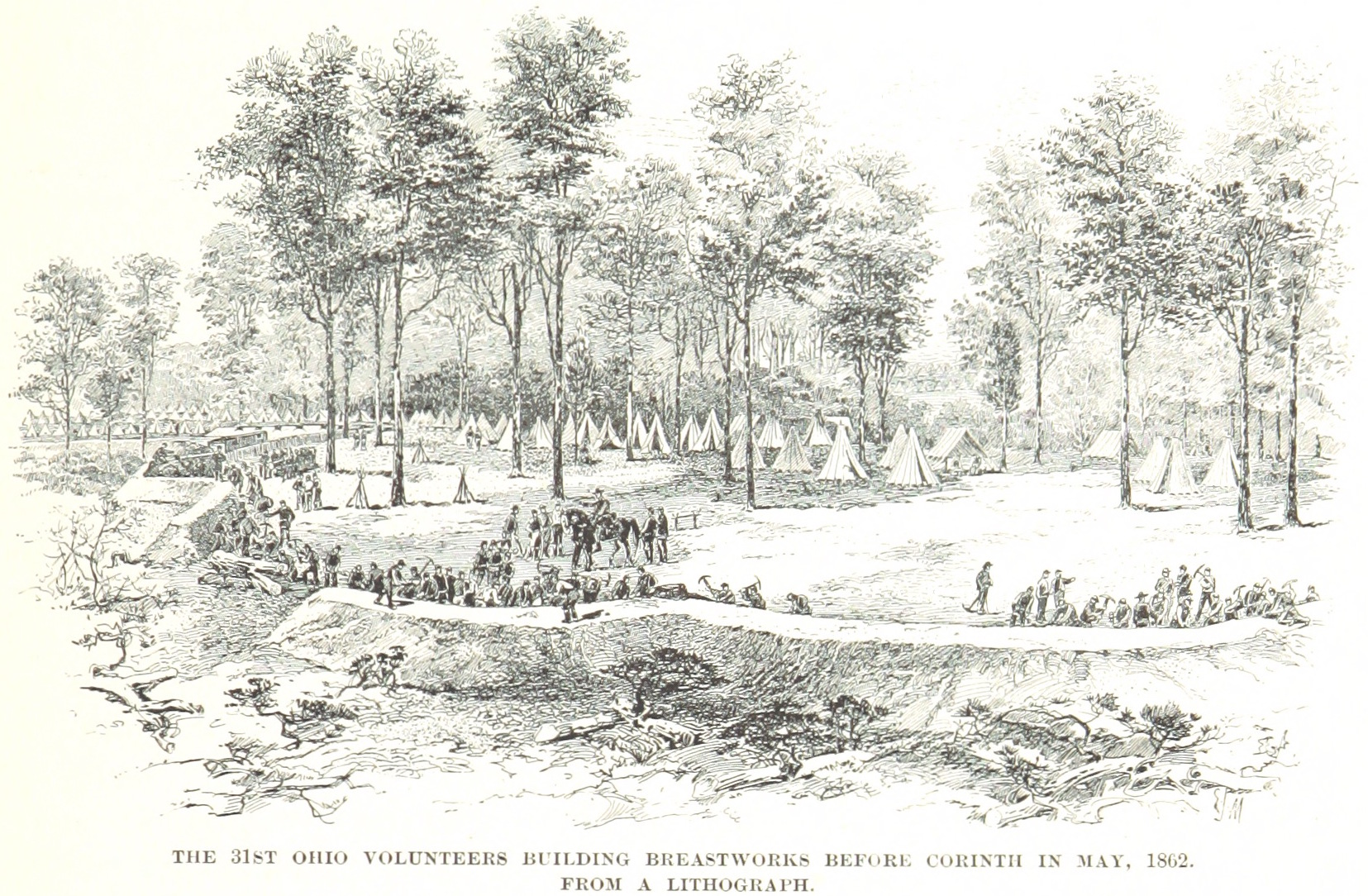
Soldiers of the 31st Ohio prepare breastworks at the Siege of Corinth

Left Ohio for Louisville, Ky., September 27, then moved to Camp Dick Robinson, Ky., October 2, and duty there until December 12. March to Somerset, Ky., December 12, 1861, and to relief of Gen. Thomas at Mill Springs, Ky., January 19–21, 1862. Moved to Louisville, Ky., February 10–16, then to Nashville, Tenn., February 18-March 2. March to Savannah, Tenn., March 20-April 8. Advance on and siege of Corinth, Miss., April 29-May 30. Pursuit to Booneville May 31-June 6. March to Iuka, Miss., with skirmishing June 22, then to Tuscumbia, Ala., June 26–28, and to Huntsville, Ala., July 18–22. Action at Trinity, Ala., July 24 (Company E). Courtland Bridge July 25. Moved to Dechard, Tenn., July 27. March to Louisville, Ky., in pursuit of Bragg August 21-September 26. Pursuit of Bragg into Kentucky October 1–15. Battle of Perryville, Ky., October 8. March to Nashville, Tenn., October 22-November 6, and duty there until December 26. Advance on Murfreesboro December 26–30. Battle of Stones River December 30–31, 1862 and January 1–3, 1863. Duty at Murfreesboro until March 13, and at Triune until June. Tullahoma Campaign June 23-July 7. Hoover's Gap June 24–26. Occupation of middle Tennessee until August 16. Passage of Cumberland Mountains and Tennessee River, and Chickamauga Campaign August 16-September 22. Battle of Chickamauga September 19–21. Siege of Chattanooga, Tenn., September 24-November 23. Sequatchie Valley October 5. Reopening Tennessee River October 26–29. Brown's Ferry October 27. Chattanooga-Ringgold Campaign November 23–27. Orchard Knob November 23. Missionary Ridge November 24–25. Duty at Chattanooga until February 1864, and at Graysville until May. Atlanta Campaign May 1-September 8. Demonstrations on Rocky Faced Ridge May 8–11. Battle of Resaca May 14–15. Advance on Dallas May 18–25. Operations on line of Pumpkin Vine Creek and battles about Dallas, New Hope Church and Allatoona Hills May 25-June 5. Operations about Marietta and against Kennesaw Mountain June 10-July 2. Pine Mountain June 11–14. Lost Mountain June 15–17. Assault on Kennesaw June 27. Ruff's Station, Smyrna Camp Ground, July 4. Chattahoochie River July 5–17. Peachtree Creek July 19–20. Siege of Atlanta July 22-August 25. Utoy Creek August 5–7. Flank movement on Jonesboro August 25–30. Battle of Jonesboro August 31-September 1. Operations against Hood in northern Georgia and northern Alabama September 29-November 3. March to the sea November 15-December 10. Near Milledgeville November 23. Siege of Savannah December 10–21. Campaign of the Carolinas January to April 1865. Fayetteville, N. C., March 11. Battle of Bentonville March 19–21. Occupation of Goldsboro March 24. Advance on Raleigh April 10–14. Occupation of Raleigh April 14. Bennett's House April 26. Surrender of Johnston and his army. March to Washington, D.C., via Richmond, Va., April 29-May 20. Grand Review of the Armies May 24. Moved to Louisville, Ky., June 5, and duty there until July.

== Casualties ==
The regiment lost a total of 233 men during service; 2 officers and 77 enlisted men killed or mortally wounded, 1 officer and 153 enlisted men died of disease.

== Commanders ==
- Colonel Moses B. Walker - commanded brigade at the battles of Perryville and Stones River; brevet brigadier general, March 27, 1865; mustered out with regiment July 20, 1865
- Lieutenant Colonel Frederick William Lister - commanded at the battles of Perryville, Stones River, and Chickamauga; brevet brigadier general, March 13, 1865

== Notable members ==
- Sergeant James C. Walker, Company K - Medal of Honor recipient for action at the battle of Missionary Ridge

== See also ==
- List of Ohio Civil War units
- Ohio in the Civil War
