= Gabriel Caldwell Wharton =

Gabriel Caldwell Wharton was born in Springfield, Washington County, Kentucky, 13 June 1839 and died in Louisville, Kentucky, 22 February 1887.

Wharton enlisted in 1861 with the 10th Regiment Kentucky Volunteer Infantry. During the Battle of Chickamauga, the brigade commander of the 2d Brigade (of the 3d Division, 14th Army Corps) fell, and Col. William H. Hays who was commander of the 10th Infantry Regiment took command of that brigade. Col. Wharton took command of the 10th Infantry Regiment at that time. By March 1863 he was promoted to Lieutenant Colonel and commanded the regiment.

After the war he resumed practice as a lawyer and died in Louisville.

== See also ==
- John M. Harlan
- William Hercules Hays
