= John H. King =

John Haskell King
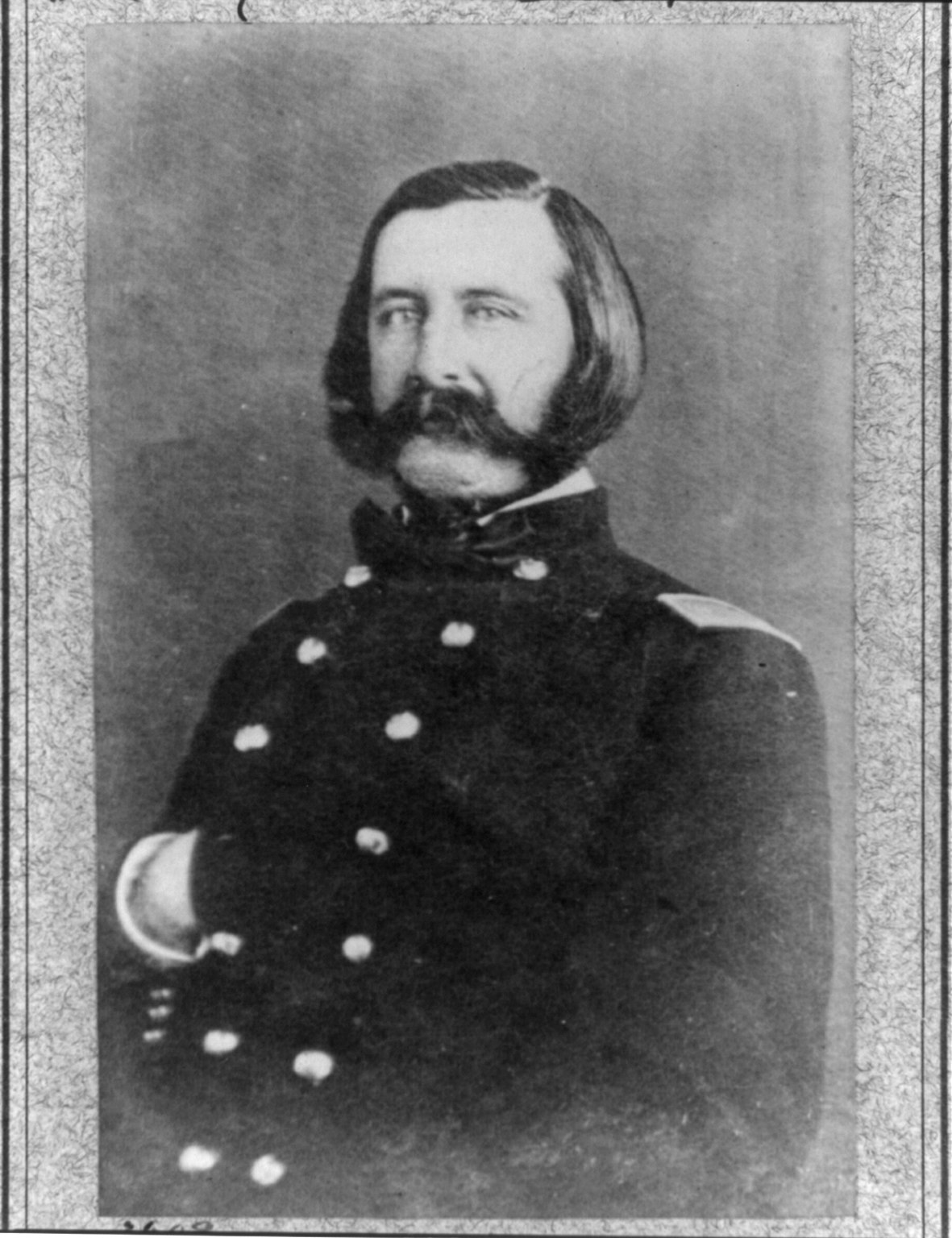
- Born: February 19, 1820; Sackets Harbor, New York
- Died: April 7, 1888 (aged 68); Washington, D.C.
- Burial place: Arlington National Cemetery
- Children: Charles Brady King
- Military career
- Allegiance: United States of America
- Branch: United States Army: Union Army
- Service years: 1837–1882
- Rank: Brigadier General; Brevet Major General
- Unit: 1st U.S. Infantry Regiment
- Commands: 15th U.S. Infantry Regiment; Regular Detachment, Army of the Ohio; Regular Brigade, Army of the Cumberland; 9th U.S. Infantry Regiment
- Conflicts: Second Seminole War; Mexican–American War; American Civil War

John Haskell King (February 19, 1820 – April 7, 1888) was a United States Army officer who fought in the Mexican–American War and in the American Civil War. A regular soldier with a career span of 45 years; he distinguished himself in the civil war as commanding officer of Regular Army detachments in the Western Theater.

== Early life and career ==
John Haskell King was born in Sackets Harbor, New York, on February 19, 1820. In his adolescent years he moved to his relative Colonel Hugh Brady in Michigan, where the later was in command of Fort Wayne. Being raised in a military household, his father being a militia officer and veteran of the War of 1812 as well, 17-years-old John sought a military appointment; and, in time for the army expansion due to the Seminole conflicts and Indian removals, he was directly commissioned as a 2nd Lieutenant in Company I of the 1st U.S. Infantry Regiment on December 2, 1837. Promoted to 1st Lieutenant on March 2, 1839, he served in the Second Seminole War from 1839 to 1840. Taking part in the Mexican–American War he was promoted to Captain on October 31, 1846, and participated in the Siege of Vera Cruz in March 1847. Captain King continued to serve on frontier duty at various posts and gained the nickname "Iron Bull" together with a reputation as hard-working and competent officer.

== The 15th U.S. Infantry ==
In March 1861 he was stationed at San Antonio, Texas, and in defiance of the rising Texan rebels, he helped organizing Camp Green Lake and sailed with nine companies of Regulars safely to New York. He was promoted to Major and assigned to raise the new 15th U.S. Infantry Regiment on May 14, 1861. Ordered to set up headquarters at Wheeling, Virginia, he asked for permission to relocate to Ohio. Instead he was ordered to relocate to the Newport Barracks at Cincinnati, Kentucky. The regimental commander, Colonel Fitz-John Porter, held a double-commission as Brigadier General of Volunteers; and for most of the time Major King stayed in actual command of the regiment. In November King took the 1st Battalion of the 15th, for now being made up of 4 companies, and went to Camp Nevin. There the regular detachments were grouped as part of the brigade of Lovell Rousseau in Alexander McDowell McCook's 2nd Division of the Army of the Ohio.

With additional reinforcements arriving Major King, as senior officer present, was assigned to command all regular forces in the brigade; in December already made up of 13 companies from the 15th, 16th and 19th regiments. By late February 1862 the detachment had been enlarged by another 6 companies as well as Battery H, 5th U.S. Artillery Regiment. Then King led the 844 infantrymen into the Battle of Shiloh, the battery being separated and fighting on another part of the battlefield. Shortly after the battle command of the, again enlarged, Regular Detachment developed on Lt. Col. Oliver L. Shepherd and King returned to his regiment. He led it in the Siege of Corinth and the Kentucky Campaign. When Maj. Gen. William Rosecrans took command of the new Army of the Cumberland, he took King and his battalion as his headquarters guard and personal escort; but returned them to the detachment when he formed the Regular Brigade in December.

Only days later the new brigade, part of Rouseau's Division in the XIV Corps, would distinguish itself in the bloody Battle of Stones River, though suffering severe casualties. King was wounded while leading his regiment, being shot twice in the left arm and another time in the left hand; afterwards falling from his horse dislocating a shoulder.

== Higher command ==
While King slowly recovered, Gen. Rosecrans had nominated several officers for a brevet promotion for their services, among those the already nominated King. But instead of a brevet promotion he received a real promotion: on April 4, 1863, he was appointed Brigadier General of Volunteers, backdated to November 29. The new general returned to field duty in May 1863, taking command of the Regular Brigade from the just recently assigned Brig. Gen. Robert S. Granger.

While the Tullahoma Campaign unfolded King was unfit to command his men in the Battle of Hoover's Gap as his hand hadn't fully healed yet. Meanwhile, he had also been made Lieutenant Colonel of the 14th U.S. Infantry Regiment though he didn't serve in the capacity. However he returned to duty with the brigade shortly afterwards and in July briefly led the division. In September, now with Absalom Baird leading the division, King commanded his brigade in the Battle of Chickamauga; suffering the highest loss percentage of any Union brigade in those days with 56%. He would later be brevetted to Colonel for his role in that battle. He then led his men into the Chattanooga campaign in which the brigade was augmented by the 11th Michigan Infantry, 19th Illinois Infantry and 69th Ohio Infantry regiments; where it participated in the Battle of Missionary Ridge, King missing the later due to sickness.

For the greater part of the Atlanta campaign King would command the division due to Gen. Richard W. Johnson first being wounded and then being assigned to lead the corps. Afterwards the brigade, and King, stayed in the department in a relative quite assignment for the rest of the war; King frequently commanding a division. When the war ended King was breveted to Brigadier General in the regular army for the Battle of Ruff's Station and to Major General in both the regulars and volunteers for his war service.

== Later life ==
King was made Colonel of the 9th U.S. Infantry Regiment in July 1865, and was sent to the Western Frontier. In 1877 he and his men briefly went to Chicago for keeping up public order during a railroad strike. He retired in 1882 and briefly settled in his home town before moving to Washington D.C. He died there of Pneumonia on April 7, 1888, and is interred on Arlington National Cemetery.

King was married to Matilda C. Davenport and had three children. Beside his widow he was only survived by a son, inventor Charles Brady King.

== See also ==
- List of American Civil War generals (Union)
