= Military crest =

Military terminology

Military crest is a term in military science that refers to, "An area on the forward or reverse slope of a hill or ridge just below the topographical crest from which maximum observation and direct fire covering the slope down to the base of the hill or ridge can be obtained."

The military crest is used in maneuvering along the side of a hill or ridge to provide the maneuvering force maximum visibility of the terrain below and minimize their own visibility by not being silhouetted against the sky, as it would be at the actual or topographical crest of the hill.

Observation posts (OPs) can be located at the military crest if the main defensive position is located on the reverse slope of the hill or ridge, as is usually done if the main defensive position would be vulnerable to the enemy's artillery if located at the military crest, making coordinated withdrawal difficult.

The main defensive position can be located at the military crest if it is defensible to a strong attack, which gives the defensive force the maximum ability to not only see the approaching attacking forces but also bring maximum firepower to bear at the earliest opportunity.

== See also ==
- Enfilade and defilade
- Indirect fire
