= John Creed Moore =

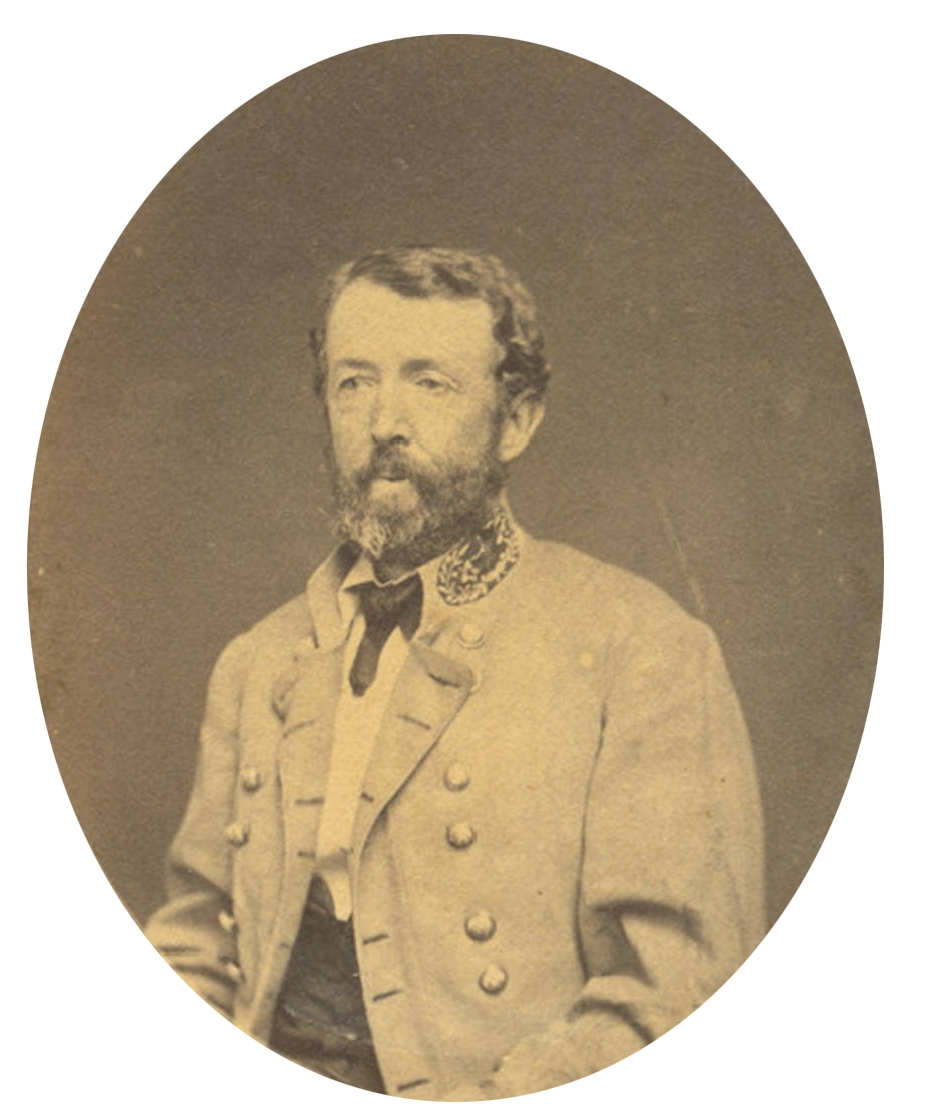
- John Creed Moore, brigadier general in the Confederate Army
- Born: February 28, 1824; Hawkins County, Tennessee, U.S.
- Died: December 31, 1910 (aged 86); Coryell County, Texas, U.S.
- Burial place: Osage Cemetery, Texas
- Military career
- Allegiance: United States of America; Confederate States of America
- Branch: United States Army; Confederate States Army
- Service years: 1849-55 (USA); 1861-65 (CSA)
- Rank: First Lieutenant (USA); Brigadier General (CSA)
- Conflicts: Seminole Wars; American Civil War; Battle of Shiloh; Second Battle of Corinth; Siege of Vicksburg; Chattanooga campaign
- Other work: Professor and Teacher

John Creed Moore (February 28, 1824 – December 31, 1910) was a United States Army officer and a graduate of West Point. He is known for being a Confederate brigadier general during the American Civil War and his works in the Texas educational system.

== Early life and career ==
John Moore was born to Margaret Creed and Cleon Moore in 1824. Moore first went to Emory and Henry College and then graduated from West Point seventeenth in his class in 1849. He joined the infantry and was commissioned a second lieutenant. Shortly after graduating Moore fought in the Seminole War. He was then stationed in Santa Fe, New Mexico, from 1852 to 1853, and as first lieutenant at Fort Union from 1853 to 1854. Moore resigned from his commission in 1855. He then became a professor at Shelby College in Kentucky.

== Civil War Service ==
Shortly after the Civil War began Moore joined the Confederate States Army as a Captain and was sent to Galveston, Texas, where he became commander, to begin working on defensive fortifications. While in Galveston John Creed Moore was partially responsible for raising and training the 2nd Texas Infantry Regiment and was elected its colonel. In 1862 Moore fought in the Battle of Shiloh where he was commended for his bravery by Brig. Gen. Jones M. Withers.

He was then promoted to brigadier general a month later on May 26, 1862, for his services at Shiloh. Moore then participated in the Second Battle of Corinth where he forced the Union troops to retreat over a mile away from their original position. Moore was then sent to reinforce the Confederate troops at Siege of Vicksburg and was then captured at Vicksburg's surrender. After a prisoner exchange Moore was put under the command of General Hardee with whom he fought during part of the Chattanooga campaign. Disputes between Hardee and Moore led to Moore requesting a transfer from Jefferson Davis. The request was denied and John Moore resigned his commission as a brigadier general in the Confederate service in February 1864.

Moore then received the rank of lieutenant colonel and was put in command of the Savannah, Georgia Arsenal. Later in 1864 he was reassigned to the Selma arsenal, where he would stay until the end of the war.

== Post Civil War ==
Once the Civil War ended, Moore moved back to Texas, where he began teaching again. From 1869 to 1870 he taught mathematics at the Coronal Institute in San Marcos. He also became the superintendent of several schools and taught in over five different schools. Moore died at the age of 86 on December 31, 1910, and was buried at Osage Cemetery.

John C. Moore c. 1890

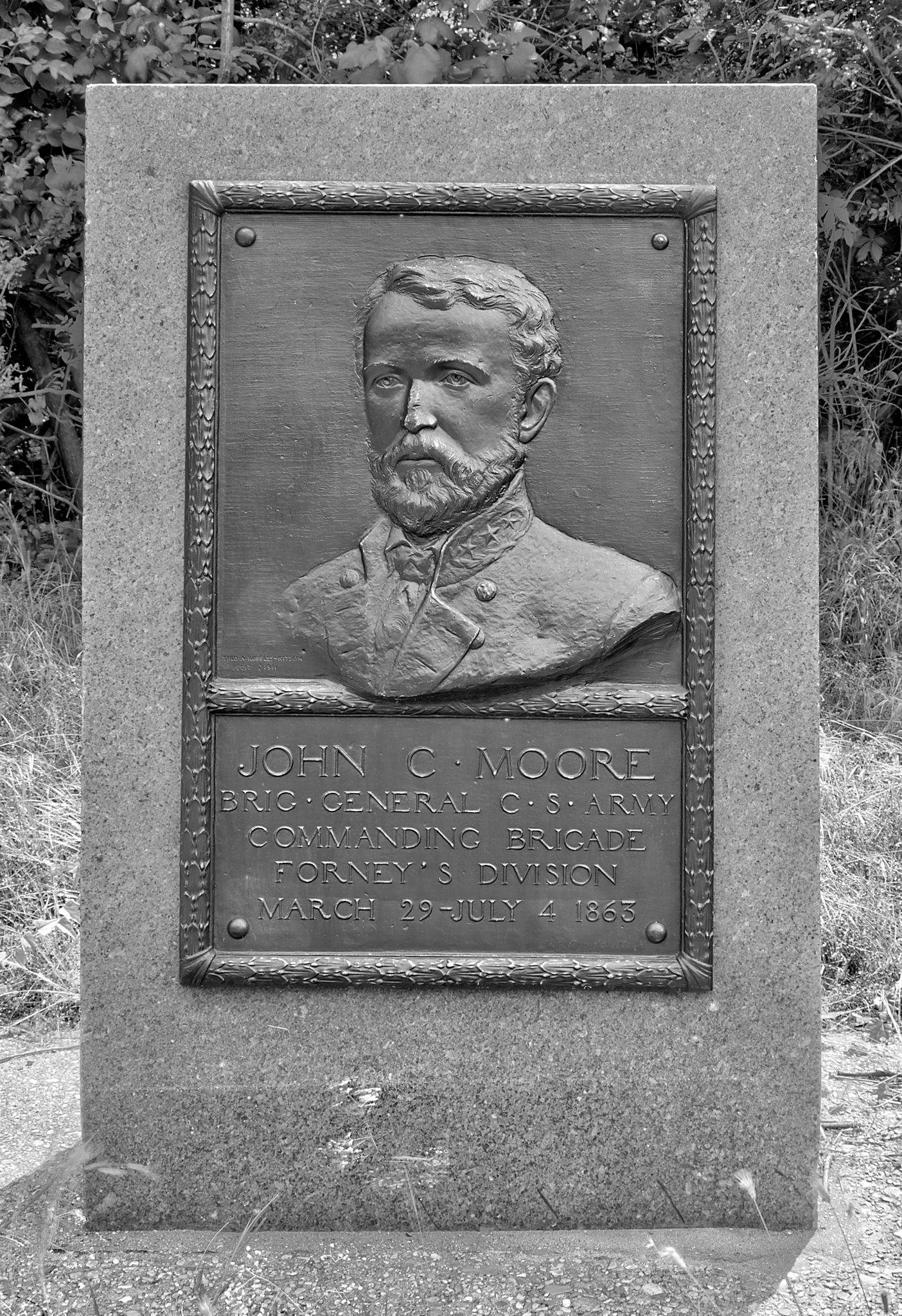
Portrait of Moore by Theo Alice Ruggles Kitson at Vicksburg National Military Park

== See also ==
- List of American Civil War generals (Confederate)
