= Moses B. Walker =

American judge

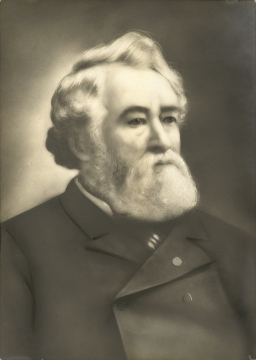
- Born: July 16, 1819; Fairfield County, Ohio
- Died: December 17, 1895 (aged 76); Kenton, Ohio
- Burial place: Grove Cemetery in Kenton
- Military career
- Allegiance: United States of America; Union
- Branch: United States Army; Union Army
- Rank: Colonel; Bvt. Brigadier General
- Commands: 31st Ohio Infantry
- Conflicts: American Civil War
- Other work: lawyer, judge

Moses B. Walker (16 July 1819 – 17 December 1895) was a Union Army officer during the American Civil War.

== Education ==
Born in Fairfield County, Ohio, July 16, 1819, Walker attended Augusta College in Kentucky and Yale College and Cincinnati Law School.

== Ohio Senate ==
He served one term in the Ohio Senate from 1850 until 1851. He was a lawyer and judge.

== Career ==
23 August 1861 Walker started working as a captain of the 12th U.S. Infantry Regiment. 23 September 1861 he was appointed colonel of the 31st Ohio Infantry Regiment.

He had several temporary brigade commands in the Army of the Ohio and Army of the Cumberland. Walker was wounded at the Battle of Chickamauga on 23 September 1863. Walker was mustered out of the volunteers on 20 July 1865 and retired from the Regular Army (United States) 19 February 1866. He was promoted to colonel on the regular army retired list on 28 July 1866.

On 13 January 1866 the President of the United States Andrew Johnson nominated Walker for appointment to the grade of brevet brigadier general of volunteers, to rank from 27 March 1865. The United States Senate confirmed the appointment on 12 March 1866.

== Military occupation of Texas ==
In 1868, after losing an election to the U.S. House of Representatives, he began participating in the military occupation of Texas.

== Texas Supreme Court ==
Walker served as associate justice of the Texas Supreme Court from 1869 until 1874.

== Death ==
Walker died in Kenton, Ohio on 17 December 1895. He was buried in Grove Cemetery, Kenton, Ohio.

== See also ==
- List of American Civil War brevet generals (Union)
