= Atlanta campaign order of battle: First phase, Union =

Units in the 1864 campaign

The following Union Army units and commanders fought in the Atlanta campaign of the American Civil War. The Confederate order of battle is listed separately. Order of battle compiled from the army organization during the campaign.

This order of battle covers the period of May 7 – July 17, 1864. The period July 17 – September 8, 1864, is listed separately.

== Abbreviations used ==
=== Military rank ===
- MG = Major General
- BG = Brigadier General
- Col = Colonel
- Ltc = Lieutenant Colonel
- Maj = Major
- Cpt = Captain

=== Other ===
- w = wounded
- mw = mortally wounded
- k = killed

== Military Division of the Mississippi ==
MG William T. Sherman
Chief of Staff: BG Joseph D. Webster
Chief of Artillery: BG William F. Barry
Headquarters Guard: 7th Company Ohio Sharpshooters: Lieut. William McCrory

=== Army of the Cumberland ===
MG George Henry Thomas
Chief of Artillery: BG John M. Brannan
Chief of Staff: BG William D. Whipple
Escort: Company I, 1st Ohio Cavalry: Lieut. Henry C. Reppert

==== IV Corps ====
MG Oliver O. Howard

Division	Brigade	Regiments and others
First Division; MG David S. Stanley	1st Brigade BG Charles Cruft; Col Isaac M. Kirby	21st Illinois; 38th Illinois; 31st Indiana; 81st Indiana; 1st Kentucky (until May 29); 2nd Kentucky (until June 3); 90th Ohio; 101st Ohio: Col Isaac M. Kirby
First Division; MG David S. Stanley	2nd Brigade BG Walter C. Whitaker; Col Jacob E. Taylor	96th Illinois; 115th Illinois; 35th Indiana; 84th Indiana; 21st Kentucky; 40th Ohio: Col Jacob E. Taylor; 45th Ohio (from June 22); 51st Ohio; 99th Ohio (until June 22): Col Peter T. Swaine
First Division; MG David S. Stanley	3rd Brigade Col William Grose	59th Illinois; 75th Illinois; 80th Illinois; 84th Illinois; 9th Indiana; 30th Indiana; 36th Indiana; 77th Pennsylvania
First Division; MG David S. Stanley	Artillery Cpt Peter Simonson (k June 16); Cpt Samuel M. McDowell (k June 27); Cpt Theodore Thomasson	5th Indiana Light Battery; Independent Battery B, Pennsylvania Light: Cpt Samuel M. McDowell
Second Division; BG John Newton	1st Brigade Col Francis T. Sherman; BG Nathan Kimball	36th Illinois: Col Silas Miller; 44th Illinois: Col Wallace W. Barrett; 73rd Illinois: Maj Thomas W. Motherspaw; 74th Illinois: Col Jason Marsh; 88th Illinois: Ltc George W. Chandler (k June 27), Col Francis T. Sherman (c July 7); 28th Kentucky: Ltc J. Rowan Boone (until May 28); 2nd Missouri: Col Bernard Laiboldt; 15th Missouri: Col Joseph Conrad; 24th Wisconsin: Ltc Theodore S. West
Second Division; BG John Newton	2nd Brigade BG George D. Wagner; Col John Blake	100th Illinois; 40th Indiana: Col John Blake; 57th Indiana; 28th Kentucky (from May 28); 26th Ohio; 97th Ohio
Second Division; BG John Newton	3rd Brigade BG Charles G. Harker (mw June 27); BG Luther P. Bradley	22nd Illinois (until June 10); 27th Illinois; 42nd Illinois; 51st Illinois; 79th Illinois; 3rd Kentucky; 64th Ohio; 65th Ohio; 125th Ohio
Second Division; BG John Newton	Artillery Cpt Charles Aleshire; Cpt Wilbur Goodspeed	Battery M, 1st Illinois Light; Battery A, 1st Ohio Light: Cpt Wilbur Goodspeed
Third Division; BG Thomas J. Wood	1st Brigade BG August Willich (w May 15); Col William H. Gibson	25th Illinois; 35th Illinois (from June 6); 89th Illinois; 32nd Indiana; 8th Kansas (from June 28); 15th Ohio; 49th Ohio: Col William H. Gibson; 15th Wisconsin: Maj Jurgen Wilson
Third Division; BG Thomas J. Wood	2nd Brigade BG William B. Hazen	6th Indiana; 5th Kentucky; 6th Kentucky; 23rd Kentucky; 1st Ohio; 6th Ohio (until June 6); 41st Ohio; 93rd Ohio; 124th Ohio
Third Division; BG Thomas J. Wood	3rd Brigade BG Samuel Beatty; Col Frederick Knefler	79th Indiana: Col Frederick Knefler; 86th Indiana; 9th Kentucky; 17th Kentucky; 13th Ohio; 19th Ohio; 59th Ohio
Third Division; BG Thomas J. Wood	Artillery Cpt Cullen Bradley	Bridges' Illinois Light Battery; 6th Ohio Light Battery

==== XIV Corps ====
MG John M. Palmer

Division	Brigade	Regiments and others
First Division; BG Richard W. Johnson (w May 28); BG John H. King	1st Brigade BG William P. Carlin; Col Anson G. McCook	104th Illinois; 42nd Indiana; 88th Indiana; 15th Kentucky; 2nd Ohio: Col Anson G. McCook; 33rd Ohio; 94th Ohio; 10th Wisconsin; 21st Wisconsin: Col H. C. Hobart; Maj M. H. Fitch (from July 4)
First Division; BG Richard W. Johnson (w May 28); BG John H. King	2nd Brigade BG John H. King; Col William Stoughton	11th Michigan: Col William Stoughton; 69th Ohio (from May 11 until July 15): Col Marshall F. Moore; Regular Detachment: Maj John R. Edie; 1st Battalion, 15th U.S. Infantry: Cpt Albert B. Dod; 2nd Battalion, 15th U.S. Infantry: Cpt William C. McManus; 1st Battalion, 16th U.S. Infantry: Cpt Alexander H. Stanton; 2nd Battalion, 16th U.S. Infantry: Cpt R. Peabody Barry; 1st Battalion, 18th U.S. Infantry: Cpt George W. Smith; 2nd Battalion, 18th U.S. Infantry: Cpt Henry Haymond; 19th U.S. Infantry (6 companies): Cpt James Mooney
First Division; BG Richard W. Johnson (w May 28); BG John H. King	3rd Brigade Col Benjamin Scribner	37th Indiana; 38th Indiana; 21st Ohio; 69th Ohio (from July 15); 74th Ohio; 78th Pennsylvania; 79th Pennsylvania (from May 9); 1st Wisconsin
First Division; BG Richard W. Johnson (w May 28); BG John H. King	Artillery Cpt Lucius Drury	Battery C, 1st Illinois Light Artillery; Battery I, 1st Ohio
Second Division; BG Jefferson C. Davis	1st Brigade BG James D. Morgan	10th Illinois; 16th Illinois; 60th Illinois; 10th Michigan (from May 15); 14th Michigan (from June 14)
Second Division; BG Jefferson C. Davis	2nd Brigade Col John G. Mitchell	34th Illinois; 78th Illinois; 98th Ohio; 108th Ohio; 113th Ohio; 121st Ohio
Second Division; BG Jefferson C. Davis	3rd Brigade Col Daniel McCook Jr. (mw June 27); Col Oscar F. Harmon (mw June 27); Col Caleb J. Dilworth	85th Illinois: Col Caleb J. Dilworth; 86th Illinois; 110th Illinois; 125th Illinois: Col Oscar F. Harmon; 22nd Indiana; 52nd Ohio
Second Division; BG Jefferson C. Davis	Artillery Cpt Charles Barnett	Battery I, 2nd Illinois Light; 2nd Minnesota Battery (detachment); 5th Wisconsin Light Battery
Third Division; BG Absalom Baird	1st Brigade BG John B. Turchin; Col Moses B. Walker	19th Illinois (until June 9); 24th Illinois (until June 28); 82nd Indiana; 23rd Missouri (from July 10); 11th Ohio (until June 10); 17th Ohio; 31st Ohio: Col Moses B. Walker; 89th Ohio; 92nd Ohio
Third Division; BG Absalom Baird	2nd Brigade Col Ferdinand Van Derveer; Col Newell Gleason	75th Indiana; 87th Indiana: Col Newell Gleason; 101st Indiana; 2nd Minnesota; 9th Ohio (until May 22); 35th Ohio; 105th Ohio
Third Division; BG Absalom Baird	3rd Brigade Col George P. Este	10th Indiana; 74th Indiana; 10th Kentucky; 18th Kentucky; 14th Ohio; 38th Ohio
Third Division; BG Absalom Baird	Artillery Cpt George Estep	7th Indiana Light Battery; 19th Indiana Light Battery

==== XX Corps ====
MG Joseph Hooker

Division	Brigade	Regiments and others
First Division; BG Alpheus S. Williams	1st Brigade BG Joseph F. Knipe; Col Warren W. Packer	5th Connecticut: Col Warren W. Packer; 3rd Maryland (detachment); 123rd New York; 141st New York; 46th Pennsylvania
First Division; BG Alpheus S. Williams	2nd Brigade BG Thomas H. Ruger	27th Indiana: Col John R. Fesler; 2nd Massachusetts; 13th New Jersey; 107th New York; 150th New York; 3rd Wisconsin
First Division; BG Alpheus S. Williams	3rd Brigade Col James S. Robinson	82nd Illinois; 101st Illinois; 45th New York; 143rd New York; 61st Ohio; 82nd Ohio; 31st Wisconsin (from July 21)
First Division; BG Alpheus S. Williams	Artillery Cpt John D. Woodbury	Battery I, 1st New York Light Artillery; Battery M, 1st New York Light Artillery
Second Division; BG John W. Geary	1st Brigade Col Charles Candy	5th Ohio; 7th Ohio (until June 11); 29th Ohio; 66th Ohio; 28th Pennsylvania; 147th Pennsylvania
Second Division; BG John W. Geary	2nd Brigade Col Adolphus Buschbeck; Col John T. Lockman; Col Patrick Henry Jones	33rd New Jersey; 119th New York: Col John T. Lockman; 134th New York; 154th New York: Col Patrick Henry Jones; 27th Pennsylvania (until May 23): 73rd Pennsylvania; 109th Pennsylvania
Second Division; BG John W. Geary	3rd Brigade Col David Ireland (w May 15); Col William Rickards Jr. Col George A. Cobham	60th New York; 78th New York; 102nd New York; 137th New York; 149th New York; 29th Pennsylvania: Col William Rickards Jr.; 111th Pennsylvania: Col George A. Cobham
Second Division; BG John W. Geary	Artillery Cpt William Wheeler (k June 22); Cpt Charles Aleshire	13th New York Light Battery; Battery E, Pennsylvania Light: Cpt Thomas S. Sloan
Third Division; MG Daniel Butterfield; BG William T. Ward	1st Brigade BG William T. Ward (w May 15); Col Benjamin Harrison	102nd Illinois; 105th Illinois; 129th Illinois; 70th Indiana: Col Benjamin Harrison; 79th Ohio
Third Division; MG Daniel Butterfield; BG William T. Ward	2nd Brigade Col John Coburn	20th Connecticut (until May 29); 33rd Indiana; 85th Indiana; 19th Michigan; 22nd Wisconsin
Third Division; MG Daniel Butterfield; BG William T. Ward	3rd Brigade Col James Wood	20th Connecticut (from May 29); 33rd Massachusetts; 136th New York; 55th Ohio; 73rd Ohio; 26th Wisconsin
Third Division; MG Daniel Butterfield; BG William T. Ward	Artillery Cpt Marco B. Gary	Battery I, 1st Michigan Light; Battery C, 1st Ohio Light
Unattached Units	Reserve Brigade Col Joseph W. Burke; Col Heber Le Favour	10th Ohio; 9th Michigan; 22nd Michigan (from May 31): Col Heber Le Favour
Unattached Units	Pontooniers Col George P. Buell	58th Indiana; Pontoon Battalion (until June 17)
Unattached Units	Siege Artillery Cpt Arnold Sutermeister	11th Indiana Battery

==== Cavalry Corps ====
BG Washington Elliott, Chief of Cavalry, Army of the Cumberland

Division	Brigade	Regiments and others
First Division; BG Edward M. McCook	1st Brigade Col Joseph B. Dorr	8th Iowa Cavalry; 4th Kentucky Mounted Infantry (from June 30); 2nd Michigan Cavalry; 1st Tennessee Cavalry
First Division; BG Edward M. McCook	2nd Brigade Col Oscar H. LaGrange; Ltc James Stewart; Ltc Horace Lamson	2nd Indiana Cavalry: Ltc James Stewart; 4th Indiana Cavalry: Ltc Horace Lamson; 1st Wisconsin Cavalry
First Division; BG Edward M. McCook	3rd Brigade Col Louis D. Watkins; Col John K. Faulkner	4th Kentucky Cavalry; 6th Kentucky Cavalry; 7th Kentucky Cavalry: Col John K. Faulkner
First Division; BG Edward M. McCook	Artillery	18th Indiana Horse Artillery Battery
Second Division; BG Kenner Garrard	1st Brigade Col Robert Minty	4th Michigan Cavalry; 7th Pennsylvania Cavalry; 4th U.S. Cavalry
Second Division; BG Kenner Garrard	2nd Brigade Col Eli Long	1st Ohio Cavalry; 3rd Ohio Cavalry; 4th Ohio Cavalry
Second Division; BG Kenner Garrard	3rd Brigade Col John T. Wilder; Col Abram Miller	98th Illinois Mounted Infantry; 123rd Illinois Mounted Infantry; 17th Indiana Mounted Infantry; 72nd Indiana Mounted Infantry: Col Abram Miller
Second Division; BG Kenner Garrard	Artillery	Chicago Board of Trade Battery
Third Division; BG Judson Kilpatrick (w May 13); Col Eli Murray; Col William W. Lowe	1st Brigade Ltc Robert Klein	3rd Indiana Cavalry (four companies); 5th Iowa Cavalry
Third Division; BG Judson Kilpatrick (w May 13); Col Eli Murray; Col William W. Lowe	2nd Brigade Col Charles Smith	8th Indiana Cavalry (from July 27); 2nd Kentucky Cavalry (from July 27); 10th Ohio Cavalry
Third Division; BG Judson Kilpatrick (w May 13); Col Eli Murray; Col William W. Lowe	3rd Brigade Col Eli Murray; Col Smith D. Atkins	92nd Illinois Mounted Infantry: Col Smith D. Atkins; 3rd Kentucky Cavalry; 5th Kentucky Cavalry
Third Division; BG Judson Kilpatrick (w May 13); Col Eli Murray; Col William W. Lowe	Artillery	10th Wisconsin Battery

=== Army of the Tennessee ===
MG James B. McPherson
Escort: 4th Company Ohio Cavalry; Company B, 1st Ohio Cavalry

==== XV Corps ====
MG John A. Logan

Division	Brigade	Regiments and others
First Division; BG Peter J. Osterhaus; BG Charles R. Woods	1st Brigade BG Charles R. Woods; Col Milo Smith	26th Iowa: Col Milo Smith; 30th Iowa; 27th Missouri; 76th Ohio
First Division; BG Peter J. Osterhaus; BG Charles R. Woods	2nd Brigade Col James A. Williamson	4th Iowa; 9th Iowa; 25th Iowa; 31st Iowa
First Division; BG Peter J. Osterhaus; BG Charles R. Woods	3rd Brigade Col Hugo Wangelin	3rd Missouri; 12th Missouri; 17th Missouri; 29th Missouri; 31st Missouri; 32nd Missouri
First Division; BG Peter J. Osterhaus; BG Charles R. Woods	Artillery Maj Clemens Landgraeber	Battery F, 2nd Missouri Light; 4th Ohio Light Battery
Second Division; BG Morgan L. Smith	1st Brigade BG Giles A. Smith	55th Illinois (from June 16); 111th Illinois; 116th Illinois; 127th Illinois; 6th Missouri; 8th Missouri; 57th Ohio
Second Division; BG Morgan L. Smith	2nd Brigade BG Joseph Lightburn	83rd Indiana; 30th Ohio (from May 22); 37th Ohio (from May 10); 47th Ohio; 53rd Ohio (from May 12); 54th Ohio
Second Division; BG Morgan L. Smith	Artillery Cpt Francis De Gress	Battery A, 1st Illinois Light; Battery B, 1st Illinois Light (until July 12); Battery H, 1st Illinois Light
Third Division; BG John E. Smith	1st Brigade Col Jesse I. Alexander	63rd Illinois; 48th Indiana; 59th Indiana; 4th Minnesota; 18th Wisconsin
Third Division; BG John E. Smith	2nd Brigade Col Green B. Raum	13th Illinois (detachment); 56th Illinois; 17th Iowa; 10th Missouri; 24th Missouri (one company); 80th Ohio
Third Division; BG John E. Smith	3rd Brigade BG Charles L. Matthies; Col Benjamin D. Dean; Col Jabez Banbury	93rd Illinois; 5th Iowa (until July 12): Col Jabez Banbury; 10th Iowa; 26th Missouri: Col Benjamin D. Dean
Third Division; BG John E. Smith	Artillery Cpt Henry Dillon	Wisconsin Light Artillery, 6th Battery; Wisconsin Light Artillery, 12th Battery
Third Division; BG John E. Smith	Cavalry	5th Ohio Cavalry; Company F, 4th Missouri Cavalry (Escort to BG John E. Smith)
Fourth Division; BG William Harrow	1st Brigade Colonel Reuben Williams	26th Illinois; 90th Illinois; 12th Indiana; 100th Indiana
Fourth Division; BG William Harrow	2nd Brigade BG Charles C. Walcutt	40th Illinois (from June 3); 103rd Illinois; 97th Indiana; 6th Iowa; 46th Ohio
Fourth Division; BG William Harrow	3rd Brigade Col John M. Oliver	48th Illinois; 99th Indiana; 15th Michigan; 53rd Ohio (until May 12); 70th Ohio
Fourth Division; BG William Harrow	Artillery Cpt Henry H. Griffiths; Maj John T. Cheney	Battery F, 1st Illinois Light; 1st Iowa Light Battery

==== XVI Corps ====
MG Grenville M. Dodge
Escort: 1st Alabama Cavalry; Company A, 52nd Illinois

Division	Brigade	Regiments and others
Second Division; BG Thomas W. Sweeny	1st Brigade BG Elliott W. Rice	52nd Illinois; 66th Indiana; 2nd Iowa; 7th Iowa
Second Division; BG Thomas W. Sweeny	2nd Brigade Col Patrick E. Burke (mw May 16); Ltc Robert N. Adams; Col August Mersy	9th Illinois Mounted Infantry: Col August Mersy; 12th Illinois; 66th Illinois (Western Sharpshooters); 81st Ohio: Ltc Robert N. Adams
Second Division; BG Thomas W. Sweeny	3rd Brigade Col Moses M. Bane; Col Henry J.B. Cummings	7th Illinois (from July 9); 50th Illinois; 57th Illinois; 39th Iowa: Col Henry J.B. Cummings
Second Division; BG Thomas W. Sweeny	Artillery Cpt Frederick Welker	Battery B, 1st Michigan Light; Battery H, 1st Missouri Light; Battery I, 1st Missouri Light (until May 22)
Fourth Division; BG James C. Veatch	1st Brigade BG John W. Fuller	64th Illinois; 18th Missouri; 27th Ohio; 39th Ohio
Fourth Division; BG James C. Veatch	2nd Brigade BG John W. Sprague	35th New Jersey; 43rd Ohio; 63rd Ohio; 25th Wisconsin
Fourth Division; BG James C. Veatch	3rd Brigade Col James H. Howe	25th Indiana; 17th New York; 32nd Wisconsin
Fourth Division; BG James C. Veatch	Artillery Cpt Jerome B. Burrows; Cpt George Robinson	Battery C, 1st Michigan Light: Cpt George Robinson; 14th Ohio Light Battery; Battery F, 2nd U.S.

==== XVII Corps ====
MG Francis P. Blair Jr.
Escort: Company M, 1st Ohio Cavalry; Company G, 9th Illinois Mounted Infantry

Division	Brigade	Regiments and others
Third Division; BG Mortimer D. Leggett	1st Brigade BG Manning F. Force	20th Illinois; 30th Illinois; 31st Illinois; 45th Illinois; 12th Wisconsin (from July 10); 16th Wisconsin
Third Division; BG Mortimer D. Leggett	2nd Brigade Col Robert K. Scott	20th Ohio; 32nd Ohio (until July 10); 68th Ohio; 78th Ohio
Third Division; BG Mortimer D. Leggett	3rd Brigade Col Adam G. Malloy	17th Wisconsin; Worden's Battalion
Third Division; BG Mortimer D. Leggett	Artillery Cpt William S. Williams	Battery D, 1st Illinois Light; Battery H, 1st Michigan Light; 3rd Ohio Light Battery
Fourth Division; BG Walter Q. Gresham	1st Brigade Col William L. Sanderson; Col Benjamin F. Potts	32nd Illinois; 23rd Indiana; 53rd Indiana; 3rd Iowa (3 companies); 32nd Ohio (from July 10); 12th Wisconsin (until July 10)
Fourth Division; BG Walter Q. Gresham	2nd Brigade Col George C. Rogers	14th Illinois; 15th Illinois (until July 5); 41st Illinois (from July 5); 53rd Illinois
Fourth Division; BG Walter Q. Gresham	3rd Brigade Col William Hall	11th Iowa; 13th Iowa; 15th Iowa; 16th Iowa
Fourth Division; BG Walter Q. Gresham	Artillery Cpt Edward Spear	Battery F, 2nd Illinois Light; 1st Minnesota Battery; Battery C, 1st Missouri Light; 10th Ohio Light Battery; 15th Ohio Light Battery

=== Army of the Ohio (XXIII Corps) ===
MG John M. Schofield
BG Jacob Dolson Cox
Escort: Company G, 7th Ohio Cavalry

Division	Brigade	Regiments and others
First Division; BG Alvin P. Hovey	1st Brigade Col Richard F. Barter	120th Indiana; 124th Indiana; 128th Indiana
First Division; BG Alvin P. Hovey	2nd Brigade Col John McQuiston; Col Peter T. Swaine	123rd Indiana; 129th Indiana; 130th Indiana; 99th Ohio (from June 22): Col Peter T. Swaine
First Division; BG Alvin P. Hovey	Artillery	23rd Indiana Light Battery; 24th Indiana Light Battery
Second Division; BG Henry M. Judah; BG Milo S. Hascall	1st Brigade BG Nathaniel C. McLean; BG Joseph A. Cooper	80th Indiana (until June 8); 91st Indiana (from June 4); 13th Kentucky (until June 8); 25th Michigan; 45th Ohio (from June 8 until June 22); 3rd Tennessee; 6th Tennessee
Second Division; BG Henry M. Judah; BG Milo S. Hascall	2nd Brigade BG Milo S. Hascall; Col John R. Bond; Col William E. Hobson	107th Illinois; 80th Indiana (from June 8); 13th Kentucky (from June 8): Col William E. Hobson; 23rd Michigan; 45th Ohio (from May 11 until June 8); 111th Ohio: Col John R. Bond; 118th Ohio
Second Division; BG Henry M. Judah; BG Milo S. Hascall	3rd Brigade Col Silas A. Strickland	14th Kentucky; 20th Kentucky; 27th Kentucky; 50th Ohio: Col Silas A. Strickland
Second Division; BG Henry M. Judah; BG Milo S. Hascall	Artillery Cpt Joseph C. Shields	22nd Indiana Light Battery (from June 29); Battery F, 1st Michigan Light; 19th Ohio Light Battery
Third Division; BG Jacob D. Cox; Col James W. Reilly	1st Brigade Col James W. Reilly; Col James W. Gault	112th Illinois (from May 11); 16th Kentucky: Col James W. Gault; 100th Ohio; 104th Ohio; 8th Tennessee
Third Division; BG Jacob D. Cox; Col James W. Reilly	2nd Brigade BG Mahlon D. Manson (w May 14); Col John S. Hurt; BG Milo S. Hascall; Col John S. Casement; Col Daniel Cameron	65th Illinois (from June 4): Col Daniel Cameron; 63rd Indiana: Col Israel N. Stiles; 65th Indiana; 24th Kentucky: Col John S. Hurt; 103rd Ohio: Col John S. Casement; 5th Tennessee (until June 5)
Third Division; BG Jacob D. Cox; Col James W. Reilly	3rd Brigade BG Nathaniel McLean; Col Robert K. Byrd; Col Israel N. Stiles	11th Kentucky; 12th Kentucky; 1st Tennessee: Col Robert K. Byrd; 5th Tennessee
Third Division; BG Jacob D. Cox; Col James W. Reilly	Dismounted Cavalry Col Eugene Crittenden	16th Illinois Cavalry; 12th Kentucky Cavalry
Third Division; BG Jacob D. Cox; Col James W. Reilly	Artillery Maj Henry W. Wells	15th Indiana Light Battery; Battery D, 1st Ohio Light
Stoneman's Cavalry Division; MG George Stoneman	1st Brigade Col James Biddle	16th Illinois Cavalry (until June 21); 5th Indiana Cavalry; 6th Indiana Cavalry; 12th Kentucky Cavalry (until June 21)
Stoneman's Cavalry Division; MG George Stoneman	2nd Brigade Col Horace Capron	14th Illinois Cavalry; 8th Michigan Cavalry; McLaughlin's Ohio Squadron
Stoneman's Cavalry Division; MG George Stoneman	Independent Brigade Col Alexander Holeman	1st Kentucky Cavalry; 11th Kentucky Cavalry
Stoneman's Cavalry Division; MG George Stoneman	Artillery	24th Indiana Light Battery (from July 6)

== Strengths ==
The following table shows total strengths of each of the major formations at several stages throughout the campaign.

Army	Corps	April 30	May 31	June 30	July 31	August 31
Army of the Cumberland	IV Corps	20,538	17,227	14,956	13,519	12,118
Army of the Cumberland	XIV Corps	22,696	23,448	19,607	18,014	15,249
Army of the Cumberland	XX Corps	20,721	16,801	14,672	12,578	12,413
Army of the Cumberland	Cavalry Corps	8,983	9,848	9,477	8,427	7,638
Army of the Cumberland	Total	72,938	67,324	58,712	52,538	47,418
Army of the Tennessee	XV Corps	12,517	12,497	11,788	9,133	8,670
Army of the Tennessee	XVI Corps	11,863	10,361	10,744	9,345	7,818
Army of the Tennessee	XVII Corps	-	9,775	9,262	6,800	5,935
Army of the Tennessee	Total	24,380	32,633	31,794	25,278	22,423
Army of the Ohio	XXIII Corps	9,854	9,971	12,906	11,960	9,981
Army of the Ohio	Cavalry Division	2,951	2,886	2,658	1,899	1,936
Army of the Ohio	Total	12,805	12,857	15,564	13,859	11,917
Military Division of the Mississippi	Grand Total	110,123	112,814	106,070	91,675	81,758
