= Chattanooga campaign order of battle: Union =

1863 forces in the American Civil War

The following units and commanders fought in the Chattanooga–Ringgold campaign of the American Civil War on the Union side. The Confederate order of battle is shown separately. Order of battle compiled from the army organization during the campaign, the casualty returns and the reports.

== Abbreviations used ==
=== Military rank ===
- MG = Major general
- BG = Brigadier general
- Col = Colonel
- Ltc = Lieutenant colonel
- Maj = Major
- Cpt = Captain
- Lt = Lieutenant

=== Other ===
- w = wounded
- mw = mortally wounded
- k = killed
- c = captured

== Military Division of the Mississippi ==
MG Ulysses S. Grant

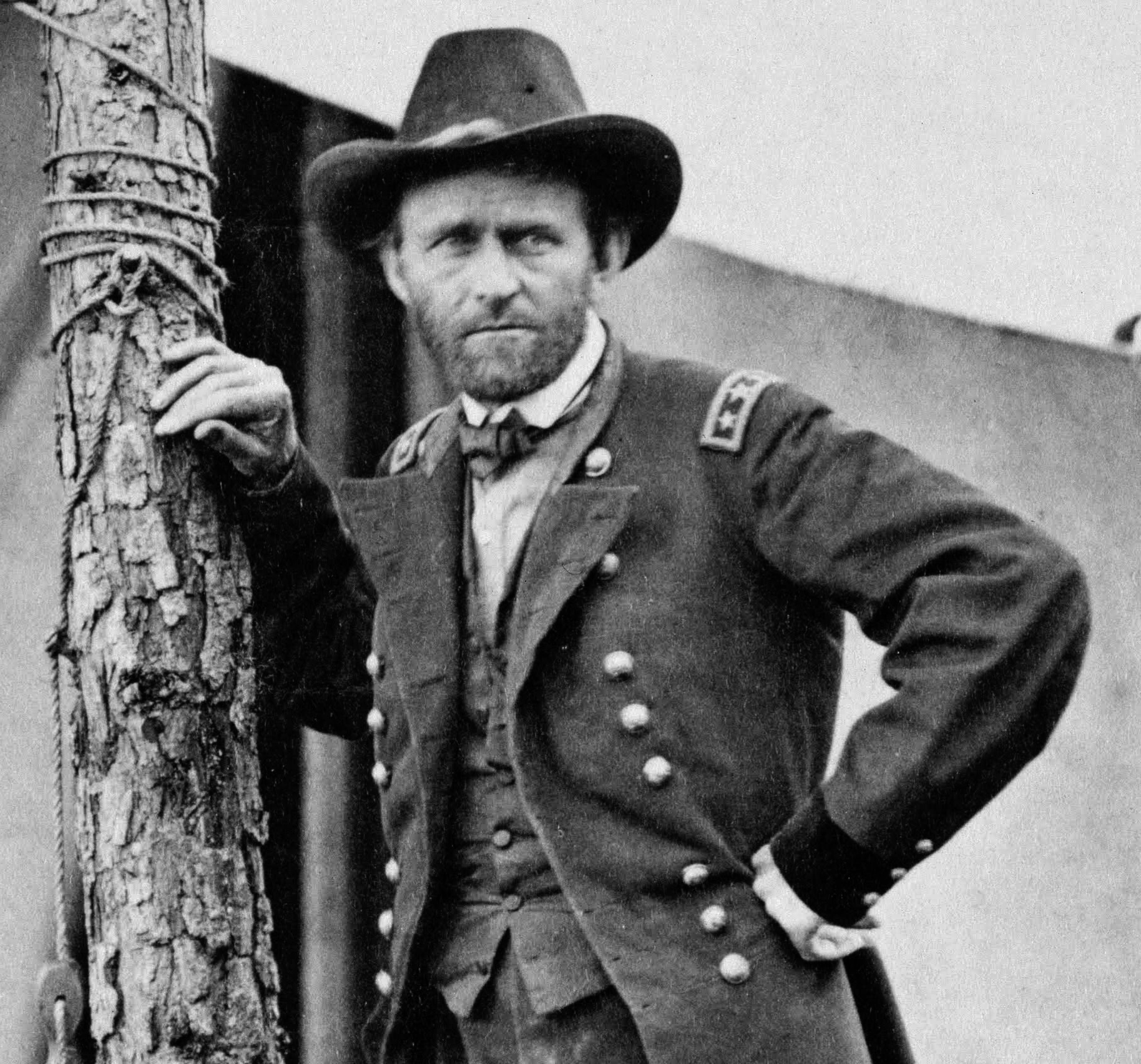
Grant

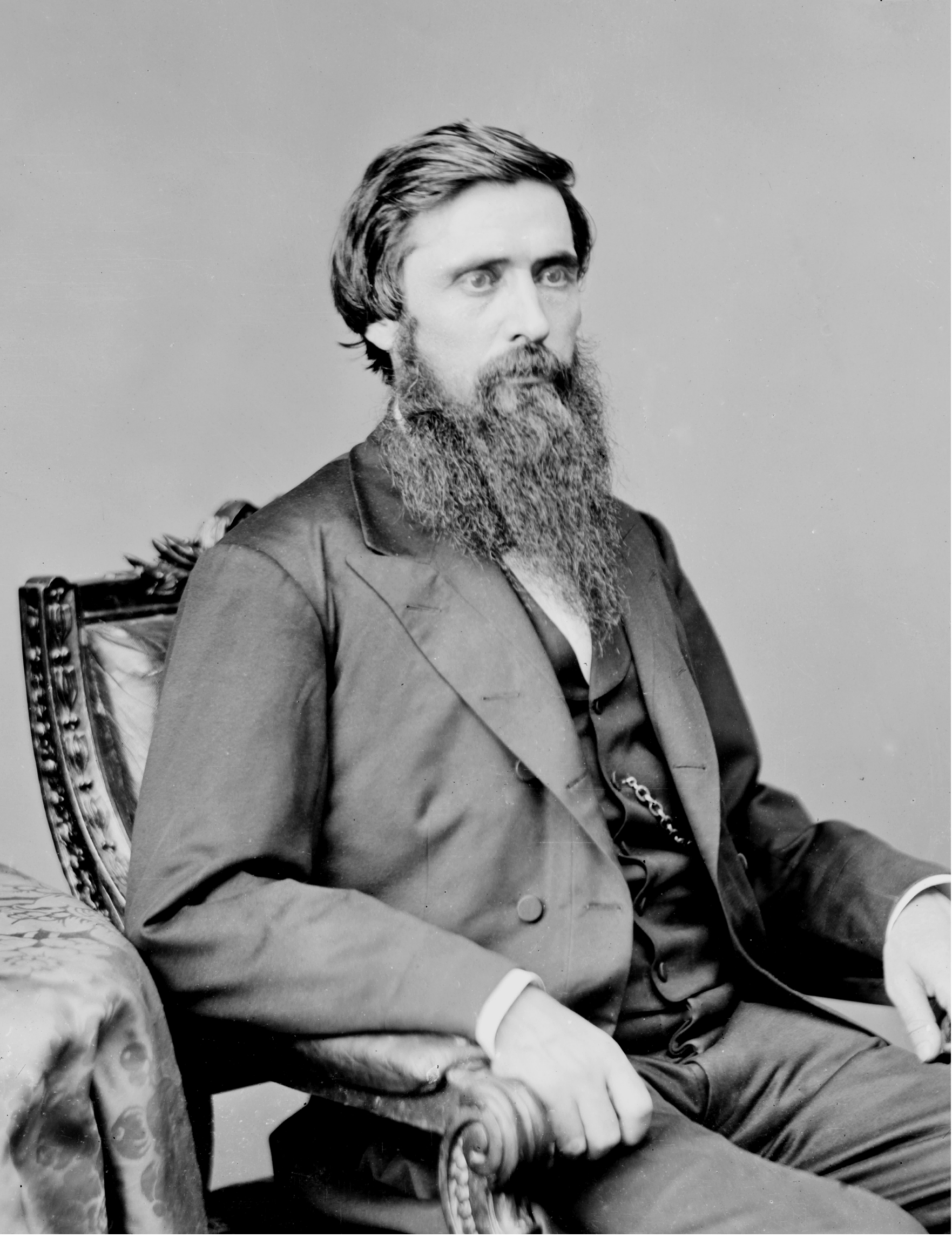
Rawlins

General Staff:

- Chief of Staff: BG John A. Rawlins
- Chief of Transportation: Col Joseph D. Webster

=== Army of the Cumberland ===
MG George H. Thomas

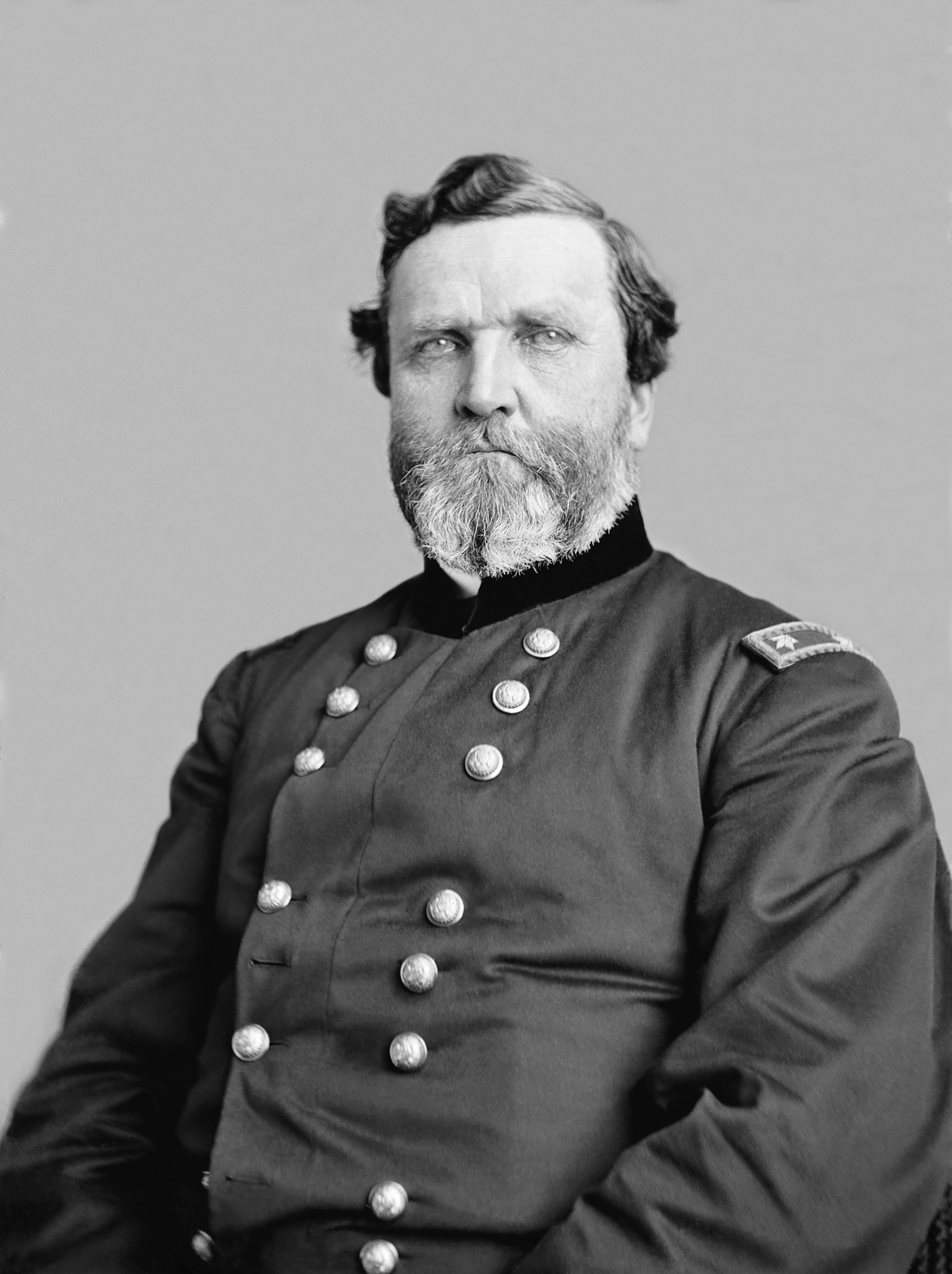
Thomas

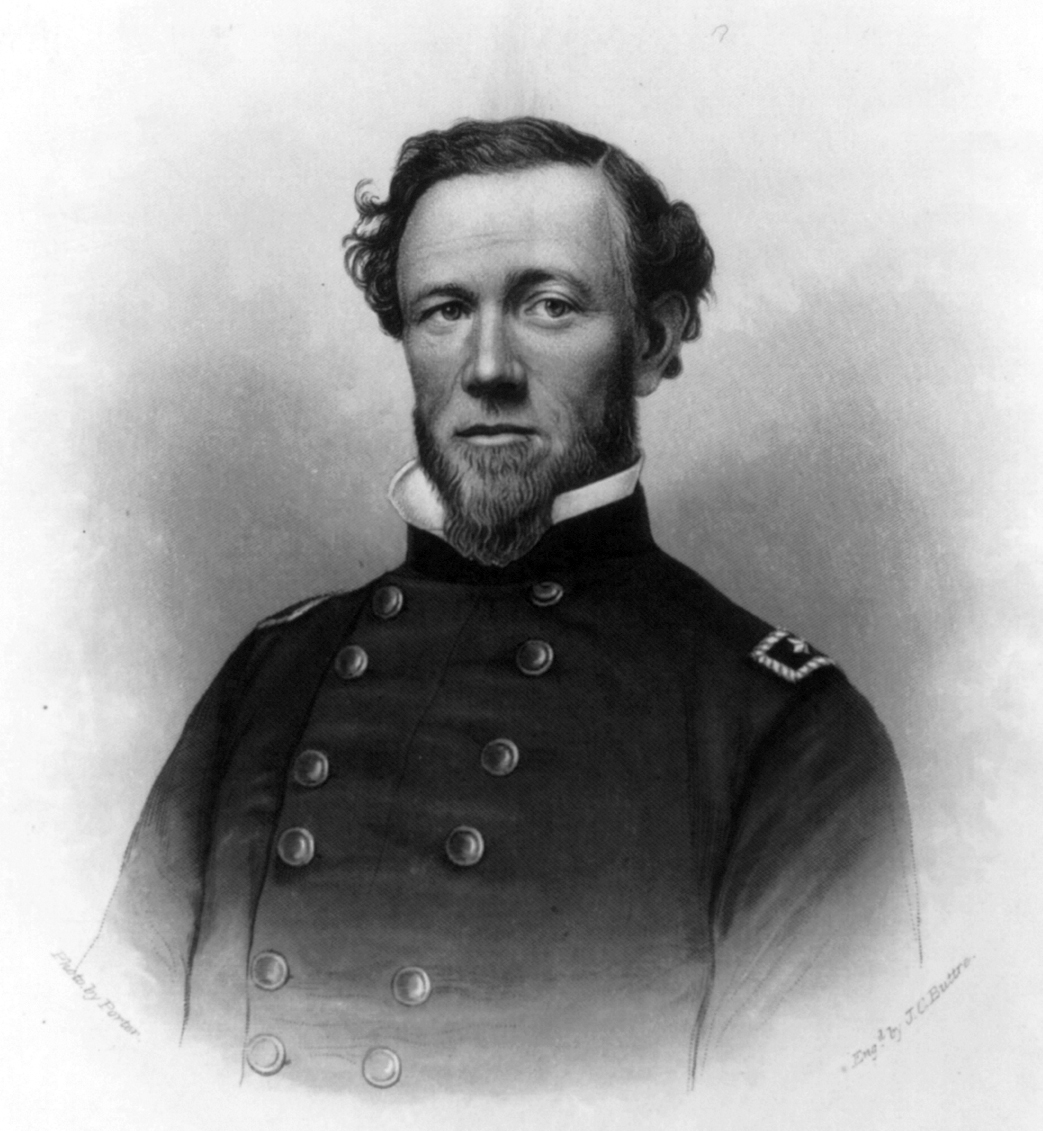
Reynolds

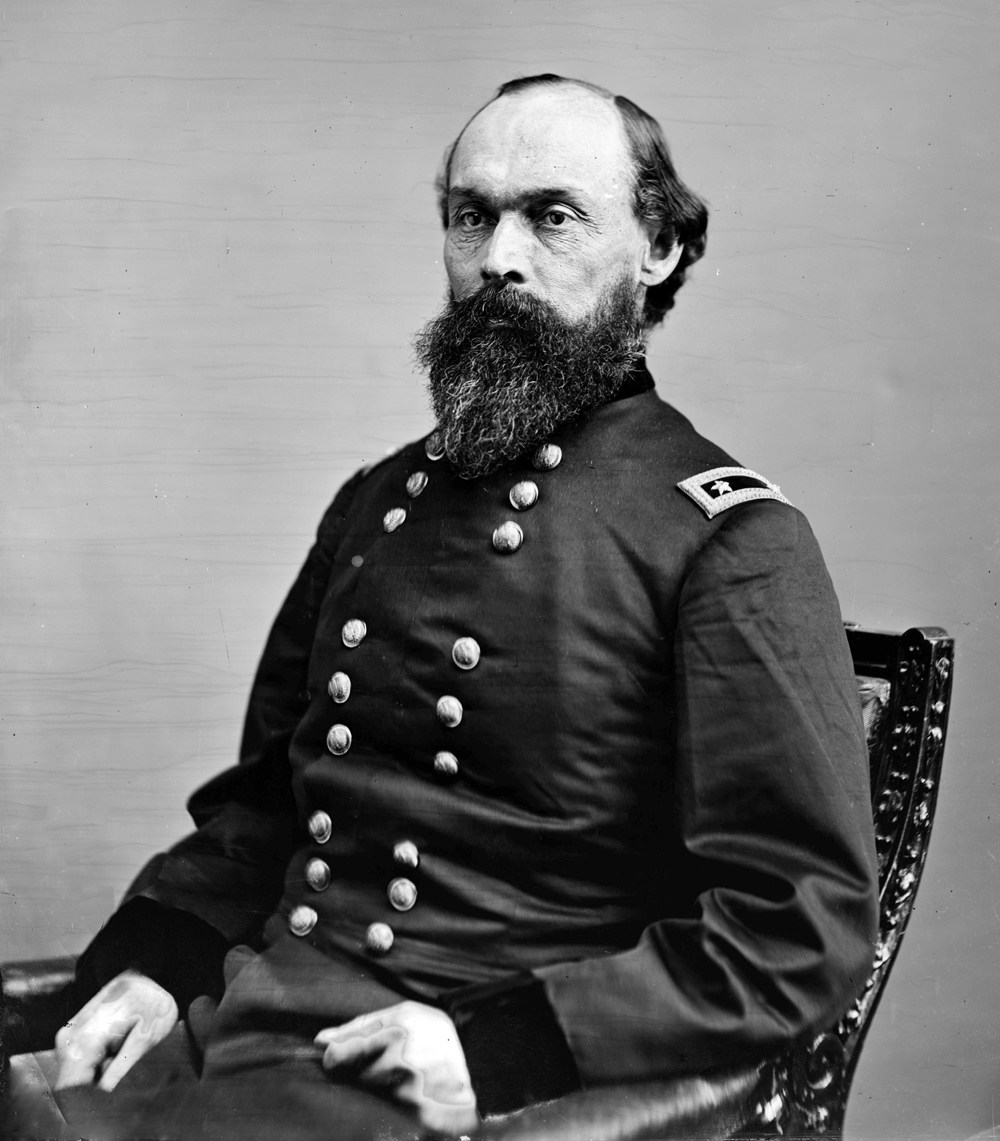
Granger: IV Corps

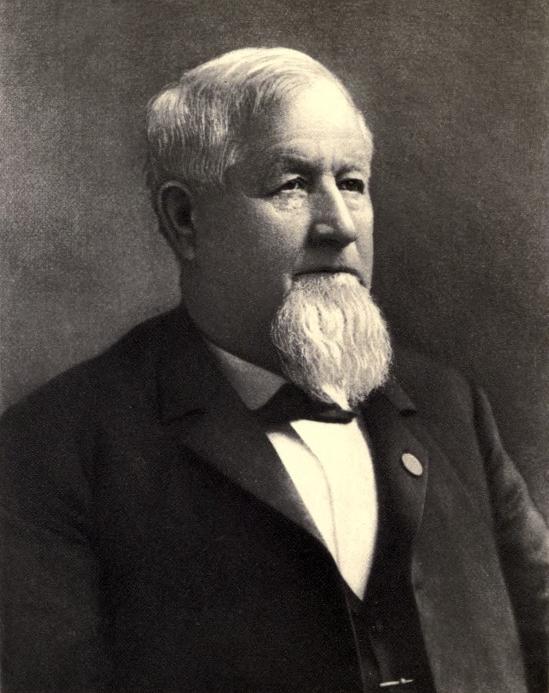
Palmer: XIV Corps

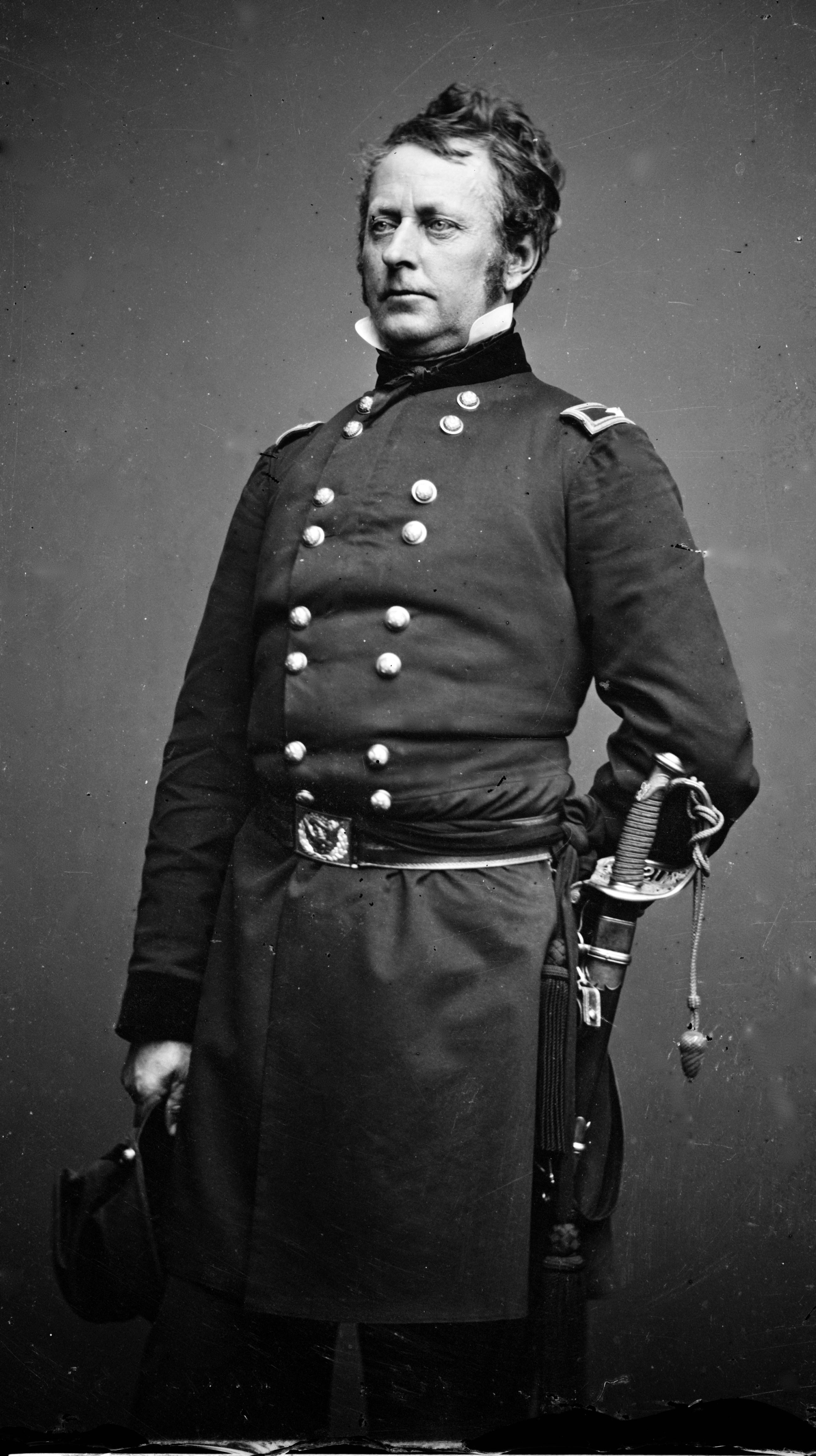
Hooker: XI, XII Corps

General Staff:

- Chief of Staff: MG Joseph J. Reynolds
- Assistant Adjutant General: BG William D. Whipple

General Headquarters:

- 1st Ohio Sharpshooter: Cpt Gershom M. Barber
- 10th Ohio: Ltc William M. Ward

==== IV Corps ====
MG Gordon Granger

Division	Brigade	Regiments and others
First Division BG Charles Cruft	2nd Brigade BG Walter C. Whitaker	96th Illinois: Col Thomas E. Champion, Maj George Hicks; 35th Indiana: Col Benjamin F. Mullen; 8th Kentucky: Col Sidney M. Barnes; 40th Ohio: Col Jacob E. Taylor; 51st Ohio: Ltc Charles H. Wood; 99th Ohio: Ltc John E. Cummins
First Division BG Charles Cruft	3rd Brigade Col William Grose	59th Illinois: Maj Clayton Hale; 75th Illinois: Col John E. Bennett; 84th Illinois: Col Louis H. Waters; 9th Indiana: Col Isaac C. B. Suman; 36th Indiana: Maj Gilbert Trusler; 24th Ohio: Cpt George M. Bacon
First Division BG Charles Cruft	Escort	92nd Illinois Mounted Infantry, Company E: Cpt Mathew Van Buskirk
Second Division MG Philip H. Sheridan	1st Brigade Col Francis T. Sherman	36th Illinois: Col Silas Miller, Ltc Porter C. Olson; 44th Illinois: Col Wallace W. Barrett; 73rd Illinois: Col James F. Jacquess; 74th Illinois: Col Jason Marsh; 88th Illinois: Ltc George W. Chandler; 22nd Indiana: Col Michael Gooding; 2nd Missouri: Col Bernard Laiboldt, Ltc Arnold Beck; 15th Missouri: Col Joseph Conrad (w), Cpt Samuel Rexinger; 24th Wisconsin: Maj Carl von Baumbach
Second Division MG Philip H. Sheridan	2nd Brigade BG George D. Wagner	100th Illinois: Maj Charles M. Hammond; 15th Indiana: Col Gustavus A. Wood, Maj Frank White (w), Cpt Benjamin F. Hegler; 40th Indiana: Ltc Elias Neff; 57th Indiana: Ltc George W. Leonard; 58th Indiana: Ltc Joseph Moore; 26th Ohio: Ltc William H. Young; 97th Ohio: Ltc Milton Barnes
Second Division MG Philip H. Sheridan	3rd Brigade Col Charles G. Harker	22nd Illinois: Ltc Francis Swanwick; 27th Illinois: Col Jonathan R. Miles; 42nd Illinois: Col Nathan H. Walworth, Cpt Edgar D. Swain; 51st Illinois: Maj Charles W. Davis (w), Cpt Albert M. Tilton; 79th Illinois: Col Allen Buckner; 3rd Kentucky: Col Henry C. Dunlap; 64th Ohio: Col Alexander McIlvan; 65th Ohio: Col William A. Bullitt; 125th Ohio: Col Emerson Opdycke, Cpt Edward P. Bates
Second Division MG Philip H. Sheridan	Artillery Cpt Warren P. Edgarton	1st Illinois Light, Battery M: Cpt George W. Spencer; 10th Indiana Battery: Cpt William A. Naylor; 1st Missouri Light, Battery G: Lt Gustavus Schueler
Third Division BG Thomas J. Wood	1st Brigade BG August Willich	25th Illinois: Col Richard H. Nodine; 35th Illinois: Ltc William P. Chandler; 89th Illinois: Ltc William D. Williams; 32nd Indiana: Ltc Francis Erdelmeyer; 68th Indiana: Ltc Harvey J. Espy (w), Cpt Richard L. Leeson; 8th Kansas: Col John A. Martin; 15th Ohio: Ltc Frank Askew; 49th Ohio: Maj Samuel F. Gray; 15th Wisconsin: Cpt John A. Gordon
Third Division BG Thomas J. Wood	2nd Brigade BG William B. Hazen	6th Indiana: Maj Calvin D. Campbell; 5th Kentucky: Col William W. Berry (w), Ltc John L. Treanor; 6th Kentucky: Maj Richard T. Whitaker; 23rd Kentucky: Ltc James C. Foy; 1st Ohio: Ltc Bassett Langdon (w), Maj Joab A. Stafford (w); 6th Ohio: Ltc Alexander C. Christopher; 41st Ohio: Col Aquila Wiley (w), Ltc Robert L. Kimberly; 93rd Ohio: Maj William Birch (mw), Cpt Daniel Bowman (w), Cpt Samuel B. Smith; 124th Ohio: Ltc James Pickands
Third Division BG Thomas J. Wood	3rd Brigade BG Samuel Beatty	79th Indiana: Col Frederick Knefler; 86th Indiana: Col George F. Dick; 9th Kentucky: Col George H. Cram; 17th Kentucky: Col Alexander Stout; 13th Ohio: Col Dwight Jarvis Jr.; 19th Ohio: Col Charles F. Manderson; 59th Ohio: Maj Robert J. Vanosdol
Third Division BG Thomas J. Wood	Artillery Cpt Cullen Bradley	Bridges' Battery Illinois Light: Cpt Lyman Bridges; 6th Ohio Battery: Lt Oliver H. P. Ayres; Pennsylvania Light, Battery B: Lt Samuel M. McDowell

==== XIV Corps ====
MG John M. Palmer
Escort:

- 1st Ohio Cavalry, Company L: Cpt John D. Barker

Division	Brigade	Regiments and others
First Division; BG Richard W. Johnson	1st Brigade BG William P. Carlin	104th Illinois: Ltc Douglas Hapeman; 38th Indiana: Ltc Daniel F. Griffin; 42nd Indiana: Ltc William T. B. McIntire; 88th Indiana: Col Cyrus E. Briant; 2nd Ohio: Col Anson G. McCook; 33rd Ohio: Cpt James H. M. Montgomery; 94th Ohio: Maj Rue P. Hutchins; 10th Wisconsin: Cpt Jacob W. Roby
First Division; BG Richard W. Johnson	2nd Brigade BG John H. King; Col Marshall F. Moore; Col William L. Stoughton	19th Illinois: Ltc Alexander W. Raffen; 11th Michigan: Cpt Patrick H. Keegan; 69th Ohio: Maj James J. Hanna; 15th United States, 1st Battalion: Cpt Henry Keteltas; 15th United States, 2nd Battalion: Maj John R. Edie, Cpt William McManus; 16th United States, 1st Battalion: Maj Robert E. A. Crofton; 18th United States, 1st Battalion: Cpt George W. Smith; 18th United States, 2nd Battalion: Cpt Henry Haymond; 19th United States, 1st Battalion: Cpt Henry S. Welton
First Division; BG Richard W. Johnson	3rd Brigade BG John C. Starkweather	24th Illinois: Col Geza Mihalotzy; 37th Indiana: Col James S. Hull; 21st Ohio: Cpt Charles H. Vantine; 74th Ohio: Maj Joseph Fisher; 78th Pennsylvania: Maj Augustus B. Bonnaffon; 79th Pennsylvania: Maj Michael H. Locher; 1st Wisconsin: Ltc George B. Bingham; 21st Wisconsin: Cpt Charles H. Walker
First Division; BG Richard W. Johnson	Artillery	1st Illinois Light, Battery C: Cpt Mark H. Prescott; 1st Michigan Light, Battery A: Cpt Francis E. Hale; 5th United States, Battery H: Cpt Francis L. Guenther
Second Division; BG Jefferson C. Davis	1st Brigade BG James D. Morgan	10th Illinois: Col John Tillson; 16th Illinois: Ltc James B. Cahill; 60th Illinois: Col William B. Anderson; 21st Kentucky: Col Samuel W. Price; 10th Michigan: Ltc Christopher J. Dickerson
Second Division; BG Jefferson C. Davis	2nd Brigade BG John Beatty	34th Illinois: Ltc Oscar Van Tassell; 78th Illinois: Ltc Carter Van Vleck; 98th Ohio: Maj James M. Shane; 108th Ohio: Ltc Carlo Piepho; 113th Ohio: Maj Lyne S. Sullivant; 121st Ohio: Maj John Yager
Second Division; BG Jefferson C. Davis	3rd Brigade Col Daniel McCook Jr.	85th Illinois: Col Caleb J. Dilworth; 86th Illinois: Ltc David Magee; 110th Illinois: Ltc E. Hibbard Topping; 125th Illinois: Col Oscar F. Harmon; 52nd Ohio: Maj James T. Holmes
Second Division; BG Jefferson C. Davis	Artillery Cpt William A. Hotchkiss	2nd Illinois Light, Battery I: Lt Henry B. Plant; Minnesota Light, 2nd Battery: Lt Richard L. Dawley; Wisconsin Light, 5th Battery: Cpt George Q. Gardner
Third Division; BG Absalom Baird	1st Brigade BG John B. Turchin	82nd Indiana: Col Morton C. Hunter; 11th Ohio: Ltc Ogden Street; 17th Ohio: Maj Benjamin F. Butterfield (mw), Cpt Benjamin H. Showers; 31st Ohio: Ltc Frederick W. Lister; 36th Ohio: Ltc Hiram F. Devol; 89th Ohio: Cpt John H. Jolly; 92nd Ohio: Ltc Douglas Putnam Jr. (w), Cpt Edward Grosvenor
Third Division; BG Absalom Baird	2nd Brigade Col Ferdinand Van Derveer	75th Indiana: Col Milton S. Robinson; 87th Indiana: Col Newell Gleason; 101st Indiana: Ltc Thomas Doan; 2nd Minnesota: Ltc Judson W. Bishop; 9th Ohio: Col Gustave Kammerling; 35th Ohio: Ltc Henry V. Boynton (w), Maj Joseph L. Budd; 105th Ohio: Ltc William R. Tolles
Third Division; BG Absalom Baird	3rd Brigade Col Edward H. Phelps (k); Col William H. Hays	10th Indiana: Ltc Marsh B. Taylor; 74th Indiana: Ltc Myron Baker; 4th Kentucky: Maj Robert M. Kelly; 10th Kentucky: Col William H. Hays, Ltc Gabriel C. Wharton; 14th Ohio: Ltc Henry D. Kingsbury; 38th Ohio: Maj Charles Greenwood
Third Division; BG Absalom Baird	Artillery Cpt George R. Swallow	Indiana Light, 7th Battery: Lt Otho H. Morgan; Indiana Light, 9th Battery: Lt Robert G. Lackey; 4th United States, Battery I: Lt Frank G. Smith

==== Artillery Reserve ====
BG John M. Brannan

Division	Brigade	Regiments and others
First Division; Col James Barnett	1st Brigade Maj Charles S. Cotter	1st Ohio Light, Battery B: Lt Norman A. Baldwin; 1st Ohio Light, Battery C: Cpt Marco B. Gary; 1st Ohio Light, Battery E: Lt Albert G. Ransom; 1st Ohio Light, Battery F: Lt Giles J. Cokerill
First Division; Col James Barnett	2nd Brigade	1st Ohio Light, Battery G: Cpt Alexander Marshall; 1st Ohio Light, Battery M: Cpt Frederick Schultz; 18th Ohio Battery: Lt Joseph McCafferty; 20th Ohio Battery: Cpt Edward Grosskopff
Second Division	1st Brigade Cpt Josiah W. Church	1st Michigan Light, Battery D: Cpt Josiah W. Church; 1st Tennessee Light, Battery A: Lt Albert F. Beach; Wisconsin Light, 3rd Battery: Lt Hiram F. Hubbard; Wisconsin Light, 8th Battery: Lt Obadiah German; Wisconsin Light, 10th Battery: Cpt Yates V. Beebe
Second Division	2nd Brigade Cpt Arnold Sutermeister	Indiana Light, 4th Battery: Lt Henry J. Willits; Indiana Light, 8th Battery: Lt George Estep; Indiana Light, 11th Battery: Cpt Arnold Sutermeister; Indiana Light, 21st Battery: Lt William E. Chess; 1st Wisconsin Heavy, Company C: Cpt John R. Davies

==== Cavalry Corps ====
Division	Brigade	Regiments and others
Second Division	2nd Brigade Col Eli Long	98th Illinois Mounted Infantry: Ltc Edward Kitchell; 17th Indiana Mounted Infantry: Ltc Henry Jordan; 2nd Kentucky: Col Thomas P. Nichols; 4th Michigan: Maj Horace Gray; 1st Ohio: Maj Thomas J. Patten; 3rd Ohio: Ltc Charles B. Seidel; 4th Ohio: Maj George W. Dobb; 10th Ohio: Col Charles C. Smith

==== Engineers and garrison ====
Division	Brigade	Regiments and others
Engineer troops BG William F. Smith	Engineer Brigade Col Timothy R. Stanley	1st Michigan Engineers (detachment): Cpt Perrin V. Fox; 18th Michigan: Maj Willard G. Eaton; 21st Michigan: Cpt Loomis K. Bishop; 22nd Michigan: Maj Henry S. Dean; 18th Ohio: Col Timothy R. Stanley
Engineer troops BG William F. Smith	Pioneer Brigade Col George P. Buell	1st Battalion: Cpt Charles J. Stewart; 2nd Battalion: Cpt Correll Smith; 3rd Battalion: Cpt William Clark
Chattanooga garrison BG James B. Steedman	Post of Chattanooga Col John G. Parkhurst	44th Indiana: Ltc Simeon C. Aldrich; 15th Kentucky: Maj William G. Halpin; 9th Michigan: Ltc William Wilkerson

==== Hooker's Command ====
MG Joseph Hooker

- Chief of Staff: MG Daniel A. Butterfield

Escort:

- 15th Illinois Cavalry, Company K: Cpt Samuel B. Sherer

===== XI Corps =====
MG Oliver O. Howard
General Headquarters:

- 8th New York, Independent Company: Cpt Anton Bruhn

Division	Brigade	Regiments and others
Second Division; BG Adolph von Steinwehr	1st Brigade Col Adolphus Buschbeck	33rd New Jersey: Col George W. Mindil; 134th New York: Col Allan H. Jackson; 154th New York: Col Patrick H. Jones; 27th Pennsylvania: Maj Peter A. McAloon (mw), Cpt August Riedt; 73rd Pennsylvania: Ltc Joseph B. Taft (k), Cpt Daniel F. Kelley (c), Lt Samuel D. Miller
Second Division; BG Adolph von Steinwehr	2nd Brigade Col Orland Smith	33rd Massachusetts: Ltc Godfrey Rider Jr.; 136th New York: Col James Wood; 55th Ohio: Col Charles B. Gambee; 73rd Ohio: Maj Samuel H. Hurst
Third Division; MG Carl Schurz	1st Brigade BG Hector Tyndale	101st Illinois: Col Charles H. Fox; 45th New York: Maj Charles Koch; 143rd New York: Col Horace Boughton; 61st Ohio: Col Stephen J. McGroarty; 82nd Ohio: Ltc David Thomson
Third Division; MG Carl Schurz	2nd Brigade Col Wladimir Krzyzanowski	58th New York: Cpt Michael Esembaux; 119th New York: Col John T. Lockman; 141st New York: Col William K. Logie; 26th Wisconsin: Cpt Frederick C. Winkler
Third Division; MG Carl Schurz	3rd Brigade Col Frederick Hecker	80th Illinois: Cpt James Neville; 82nd Illinois: Ltc Edward S. Salomon; 68th New York: Ltc Albert von Steinhausen; 75th Pennsylvania: Maj August Ledig
	Artillery Maj Thomas W. Osborn	1st New York Light, Battery I: Cpt Michael Wiedrich; New York Light, 13th Battery: Cpt William Wheeler; 1st Ohio Light, Battery I: Cpt Hubert Dilger; 1st Ohio Light, Battery K: Lt Nicholas Sahm; 4th United States, Battery G: Lt Christopher F. Merkle

===== XII Corps =====
Division	Brigade	Regiments and others
Second Division; BG John W. Geary	1st Brigade Col Charles Candy; Col William R. Creighton (k); Col Thomas J. Ahl	5th Ohio: Col John H. Patrick; 7th Ohio: Col William R. Creighton, Ltc Orrin J. Crane (k), Cpt Ernst J. Krieger; 29th Ohio: Col William F. Fitch; 66th Ohio: Ltc Eugene Powell, Cpt Thomas McConnell; 28th Pennsylvania: Col Thomas J. Ahl, Cpt John H. Flynn; 147th Pennsylvania: Ltc Ario Pardee Jr.
Second Division; BG John W. Geary	2nd Brigade Col George A. Cobham Jr.	29th Pennsylvania: Col William Rickards Jr.; 109th Pennsylvania: Cpt Frederick L. Gimber; 111th Pennsylvania: Col Thomas M. Walker
Second Division; BG John W. Geary	3rd Brigade Col David Ireland	60th New York: Col Abel Godard; 78th New York: Ltc Herbert von Hammerstein; 102nd New York: Col James C. Lane; 137th New York: Cpt Milo B. Eldredge; 149th New York: Col Henry A. Barnum, Ltc Charles B. Randoll
Second Division; BG John W. Geary	Artillery Maj John A. Reynolds	Pennsylvania Light Artillery, Battery E: Lt James D. McGill; 5th United States, Battery K: Cpt Edmund C. Bainbridge

=== Army of the Tennessee ===
MG William T. Sherman

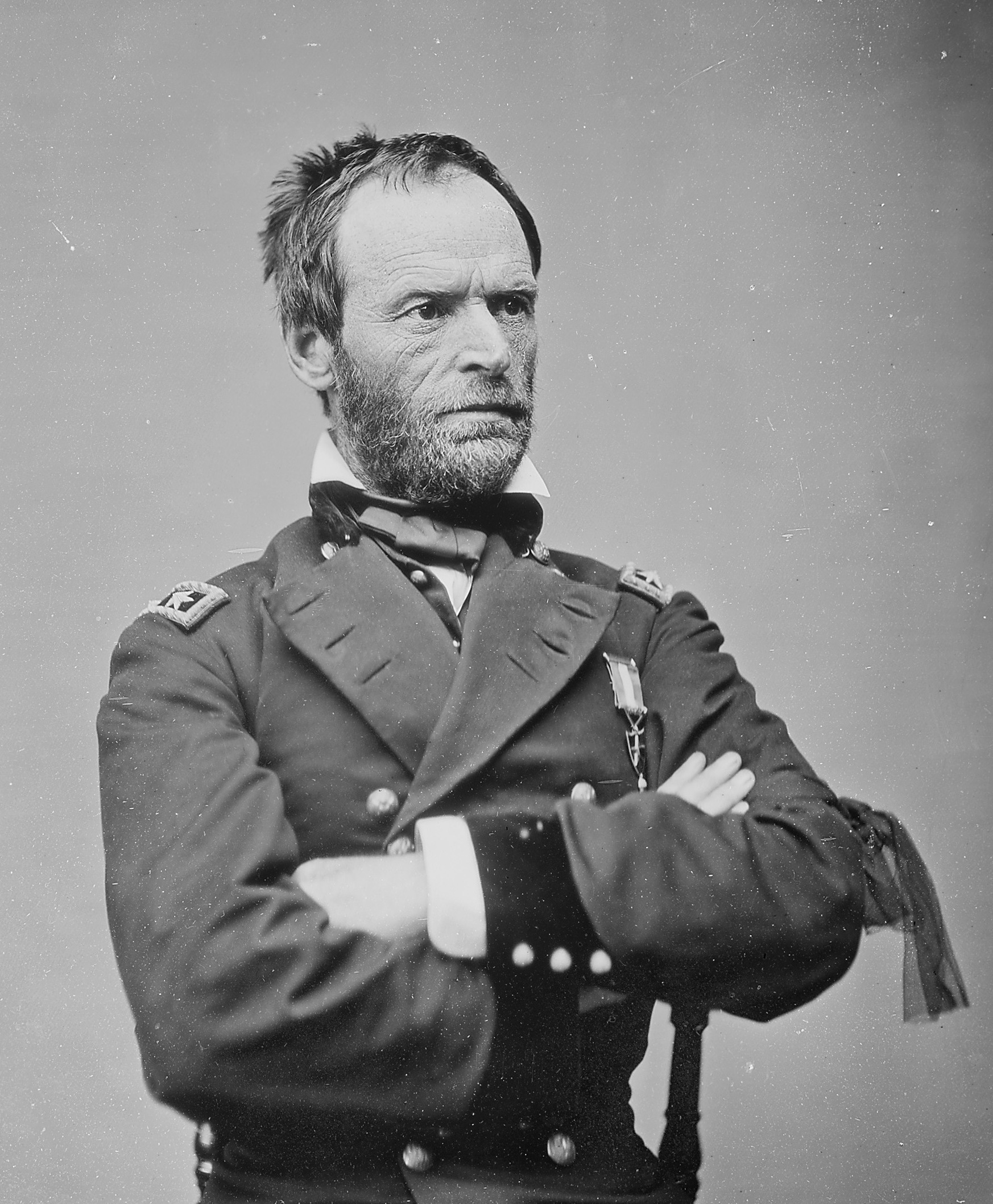
Sherman

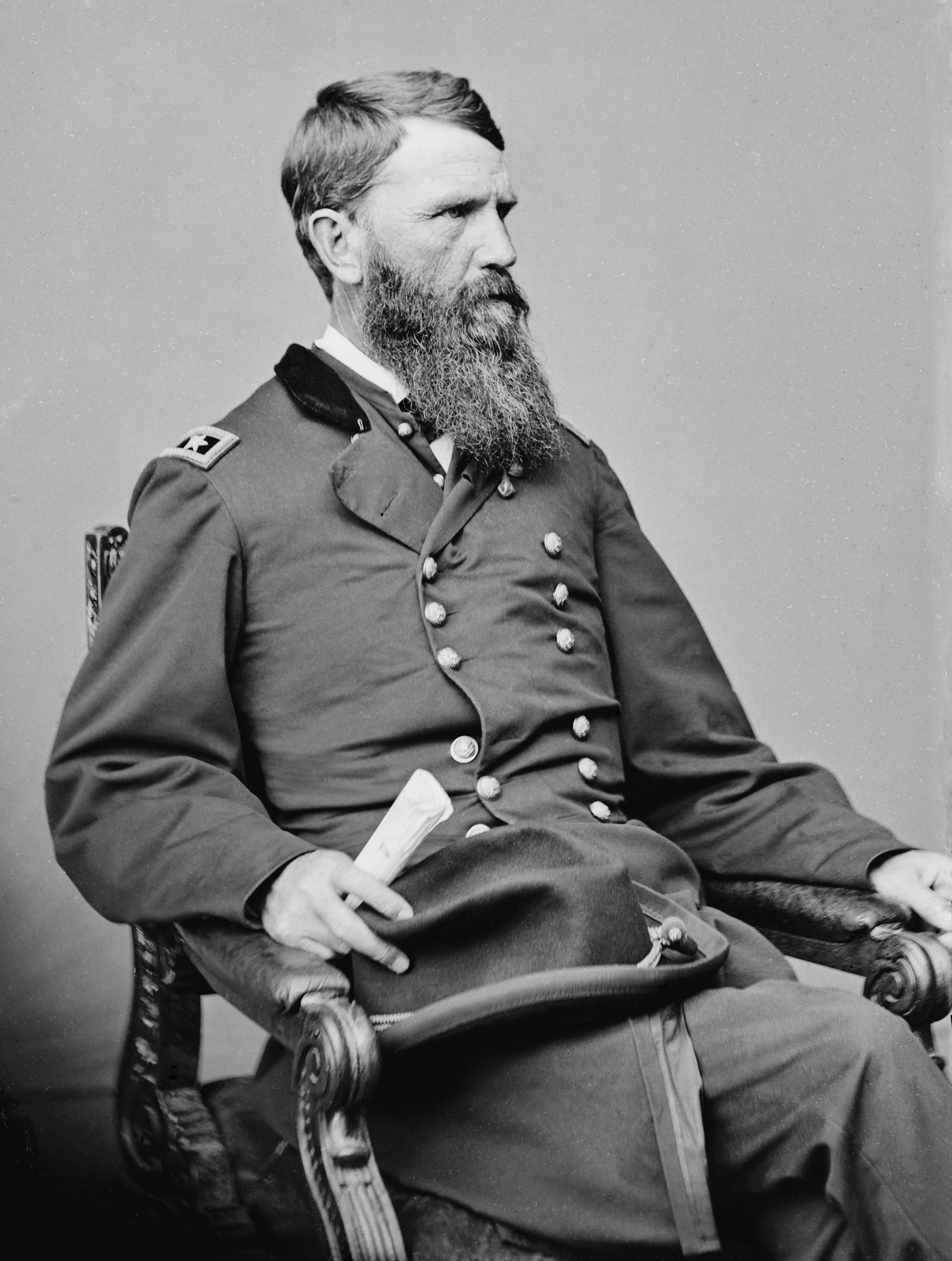
Blair: XV Corps

==== XV Corps ====
MG Francis P. Blair

Division	Brigade	Regiments and others
First Division; BG Peter J. Osterhaus	1st Brigade BG Charles R. Woods	13th Illinois: Ltc Frederick W. Partridge (w), Maj Douglas R. Bushnell (k), Cpt George P. Brown; 3rd Missouri: Ltc Theodore Meumann; 12th Missouri: Col Hugo Wangelin (w), Ltc Jacob Kaercher; 17th Missouri: Col John F. Cramer; 27th Missouri: Col Thomas Curley; 29th Missouri: Col James Peckham (w), Maj Philip H. Murphy; 31st Missouri: Ltc Samuel P. Simpson; 32nd Missouri: Ltc Henry C. Warmoth; 76th Ohio: Maj Willard Warner
First Division; BG Peter J. Osterhaus	2nd Brigade Col James A. Williamson	4th Iowa: Ltc George Burton; 9th Iowa: Col David Carskaddon; 25th Iowa: Col George A. Stone; 26th Iowa: Col Milo Smith; 30th Iowa: Ltc Aurelius Roberts; 31st Iowa: Ltc Jeremiah W. Jenkins
First Division; BG Peter J. Osterhaus	Artillery Cpt Henry H. Griffiths	Iowa Light, 1st Battery: Lt James M. Williams; 2nd Missouri Light, Battery F: Cpt Clemens Landgraeber; Ohio Light, 4th Battery: Cpt George Froehlich
Second Division; BG Morgan L. Smith	1st Brigade BG Giles A. Smith (w); Col Nathan W. Tupper	55th Illinois: Col Oscar Malmborg; 116th Illinois: Col Nathan W. Tupper, Ltc James P. Boyd; 127th Illinois: Ltc Frank S. Curtiss; 6th Missouri: Ltc Ira Boutell; 8th Missouri: Ltc David C. Coleman; 57th Ohio: Ltc Samuel R. Mott; 13th United States, 1st Battalion: Cpt Charles C. Smith
Second Division; BG Morgan L. Smith	2nd Brigade BG Joseph A. J. Lightburn	83rd Indiana: Col Benjamin J. Spooner; 30th Ohio: Col Theodore Jones; 37th Ohio: Ltc Louis Von Blessingh; 47th Ohio: Col Augustus C. Parry; 54th Ohio: Maj Robert Williams Jr.; 4th West Virginia: Col James H. Dayton
Second Division; BG Morgan L. Smith	Artillery	1st Illinois Light, Battery A: Cpt Peter P. Wood; 1st Illinois Light, Battery B: Cpt Israel P. Rumsey; 1st Illinois Light, Battery H: Lt Francis DeGress
Fourth Division; BG Hugh B. Ewing	1st Brigade Col John M. Loomis	26th Illinois: Ltc Robert A. Gillmore; 90th Illinois: Col Timothy O'Meara (k), Ltc Owen Stuart; 12th Indiana: Col Reuben Williams; 100th Indiana: Ltc Albert Heath
Fourth Division; BG Hugh B. Ewing	2nd Brigade BG John M. Corse (w); Col Charles C. Walcutt	40th Illinois: Maj Hiram W. Hall; 103rd Illinois: Col William A. Dickerman; 6th Iowa: Ltc Alexander J. Miller; 46th Ohio: Col Charles C. Walcutt, Cpt Isaac N. Alexander
Fourth Division; BG Hugh B. Ewing	3rd Brigade Col Joseph R. Cockerill	48th Illinois: Ltc Lucien Greathouse; 97th Indiana: Col Robert F. Catterson; 99th Indiana: Col Alexander Fowler; 53rd Ohio: Col Wells S. Jones; 70th Ohio: Maj William B. Brown
Fourth Division; BG Hugh B. Ewing	Artillery Cpt Henry Richardson	1st Illinois Light, Battery F: Cpt John T. Cheney; 1st Illinois Light, Battery I: Lt Josiah H. Burton; 1st Missouri Light, Battery D: Lt Byron M. Callender

==== XVII Corps ====
Division	Brigade	Regiments and others
Second Division; BG John E. Smith	1st Brigade Col Jesse I. Alexander	63rd Illinois: Col Joseph B. McCown; 48th Indiana: Ltc Edward J. Wood; 59th Indiana: Cpt Willford H. Welman; 4th Minnesota: Ltc John E. Tourtellotte; 18th Wisconsin: Col Gabriel Bouck
Second Division; BG John E. Smith	2nd Brigade Col Green B. Raum (w); Col Francis C. Deimling; Col Clark R. Wever	56th Illinois: Maj Pinckney J. Welsh (w); 17th Iowa: Col Clark R. Wever, Maj John F. Walden; 10th Missouri: Col Francis C. Deimling, Ltc Christian Happel, Col Francis C. Deimling; 24th Missouri, Company E: Cpt William W. McCammon; 80th Ohio: Ltc Pren Metham
Second Division; BG John E. Smith	3rd Brigade BG Charles L. Matthies (w); Col Benjamin D. Dean; Col Jabez Banbury	93rd Illinois: Col Holden Putnam (k), Ltc Nicholas C. Buswell; 5th Iowa: Col Jabez Banbury, Ltc Ezekiel S. Sampson; 10th Iowa: Ltc Paris P. Henderson, Maj Nathaniel McCalla (w); 26th Missouri: Col Benjamin D. Dean
Second Division; BG John E. Smith	Artillery Cpt Henry Dillon	Cogswell's Illinois Battery: Cpt William Cogswell; Wisconsin Light, 6th Battery: Lt Samuel F. Clark; Wisconsin Light, 12th Battery: Cpt William Zickerick
