= American steamship General Lyon (1864) =

U.S. Army transport of the American Civil War

The General Lyon was a 1,026-ton screw steamer and United States Army transport built at East Haddam, Connecticut and chartered by the Federal government in March 1864. It was used as a troop transport on the eastern seaboard during the American Civil War, taking part in the campaigns against Battery Wagner, the Bermuda Hundred and Fort Fisher.

Late in the war, General Lyon was used extensively by the Union Army to carry Federal troops from Wilmington, North Carolina to Fortress Monroe, Virginia and New York. On board when the vessel sailed from Wilmington on March 29, 1865, were a large number of discharged Union soldiers returning from the war, along with a number of paroled prisoners of war, approximately 130 refugees and other civilians. The ship anchored for the night off Smithville (present-day Southport) near the mouth of the Cape Fear River, waiting for high tide to cross the bar. Between 8 AM and 10 AM on Thursday, March 30, the General Lyon crossed the bar and steamed northeast to clear Cape Hatteras.

On March 31, 1865, the ship hit rough weather off Cape Hatteras and a fire broke out in the engine room, quickly spreading through the ship. Of the passengers on board, approximately 500 lost their lives, including all but five members of a 205-man contingent of the U.S. 56th Illinois Volunteer Infantry Regiment. There were only 29 survivors of the disaster in total, 28 of whom were named in the New York Times. Isaac Wilhite of the 56th Illinois also survived.

The following two weeks saw a series of events that brought the war to its dramatic climax, including the surrender of Confederate General Robert E. Lee to Union General Ulysses S. Grant on April 9 and the assassination of U.S. President Abraham Lincoln on April 14. As a result, the General Lyon disaster was overshadowed by larger historical events and an investigation into the cause of the tragedy was never carried out.

== See also ==
- 56th Illinois Volunteer Infantry Regiment
