= 28th Kentucky Infantry Regiment =

- Active: October 10, 1861, to December 14, 1865
- Country: United States
- Allegiance: Union
- Branch: Infantry
- Engagements: Battle of Munfordville; Atlanta campaign Battle of Resaca; Battle of Kennesaw Mountain; Siege of Atlanta; Battle of Jonesboro; Battle of Spring Hill; Battle of Franklin; Battle of Nashville

The 28th Kentucky Infantry Regiment was an infantry regiment that served in the Union Army during the American Civil War.

== Service ==
The 28th Kentucky Infantry Regiment was organized at Louisville and New Haven, Kentucky and mustered in for a three-year enlistment on May 9, 1862, under the command of Colonel William P. Boone.

The regiment was attached to 16th Brigade, Army of the Ohio, January–February 1862. 23rd Independent Brigade, Army of the Ohio, to August 1862. Dumont's Independent Brigade, Army of the Ohio, to October 1862. District of Louisville, Kentucky, Department of the Ohio, to November 1862. Clarksville District, Western Kentucky, Department of the Ohio, to June 1863. 1st Brigade, 3rd Division, Reserve Corps, Army of the Cumberland, to October 1863. Unattached, Department of the Cumberland, to April 1864. 1st Brigade, 2nd Division, IV Corps, Army of the Cumberland, to May 1864. 2nd Brigade, 2nd Division, IV Corps, to August 1865. Department of Texas to December 1865.

The 28th Kentucky Infantry mustered out of service on December 14, 1865.

== Detailed service ==
Duty at Shepherdsville, Ky., October to December 1861. Moved to New Haven, Ky., and guard Louisville & Nashville Railroad and Lebanon Branch and at Bowling Green, Ky., and Franklin, Ky., until July 1862 (a detachment at Gallatin, Tenn.). Operations against Morgan July 4–28. Lebanon July 12. Attack on Gallatin August 12 (Companies A, B, D, E, and F). Guarding railroad and operating against guerrillas between Green River and the Cumberland River and Louisville & Nashville Railroad until December 1862. Munfordville and Woodsonville, Ky., September 14–17 (Company I). Garrison at Clarksville, Tenn., December 1862, to August 1863. Regiment mounted and engaged in scouting about Clarksville with many skirmishes. Ordered to Columbia August 25. Scouting and outpost duty on flanks of the army and about Chattanooga until January 1864. Action at Railroad Tunnel, near Cowan, October 9, 1863 (detachment). Reconnaissance toward Dalton, Ga., January 21–23, 1864. Near Dalton January 22. Picketing roads south of Chattanooga toward Lafayette, Resaca and Dalton, Ga., until March. Demonstration on Dalton, Ga., February 22–27. Rocky Faced Ridge and Buzzard's Roost Gap February 23–25. At Pulaski, Tenn., until April. At Lee and Gordon's Mills until April 20. Dismounted April 20 and joined IV Corps. Atlanta Campaign May 1 to September 8. Demonstrations on Rocky Faced Ridge and Dalton May 8–13. Buzzard's Roost Gap May 8–9. Battle of Resaca May 14–15. Adairsville May 17. Near Kingston May 18–19. Near Cassville May 19. Advance on Dallas May 22–25. Operations on line of Pumpkin Vine Creek and battles about Dallas, New Hope Church and Allatoona Hills May 25-June 5. Operations about Marietta and against Kenesaw Mountain June 10-July 2. Pine Hill June 11–14. Lost Mountain June 15–17. Assault on Kennesaw June 27. Ruff's Station or Smyrna Camp Ground July 4. Chattahoochie River July 5–17. Buckhead or Nancy's Creek July 18. Peachtree Creek July 19–20. Siege of Atlanta July 22-August 25. Flank movement on Jonesboro August 25–30. Battle of Jonesboro August 31-September 1. Lovejoy's Station September 2–6. Operations against Hood in northern Georgia and northern Alabama September 29-November 3. Nashville Campaign November–December. In front of Columbia November 24–27. Spring Hill November 29. Battle of Franklin November 30. Battle of Nashville December 15–16. Pursuit of Hood to the Tennessee River December 17–28. Moved to Huntsville, Ala., and duty there until March 1865. Expedition to Bull's Gap and operations in eastern Tennessee March 15-April 22. Moved to Nashville, Tenn., and duty there until June. Moved to New Orleans, thence to Texas June and July. Duty at San Antonio and Victoria until December.

== Casualties ==
The regiment lost a total of 112 men during service; 1 officer and 36 enlisted men killed or mortally wounded, 1 officer and 74 enlisted men died of disease.

== Commanders ==
- Colonel William P. Boone
- Lieutenant Colonel J. Rowan Boone - commanded at the battle of Nashville
- Major George W. Barth - commanded at the battle of Nashville

== See also ==
- List of Kentucky Civil War Units
- Kentucky in the Civil War
