= 20th Connecticut Infantry Regiment =

20th Connecticut Volunteer Infantry
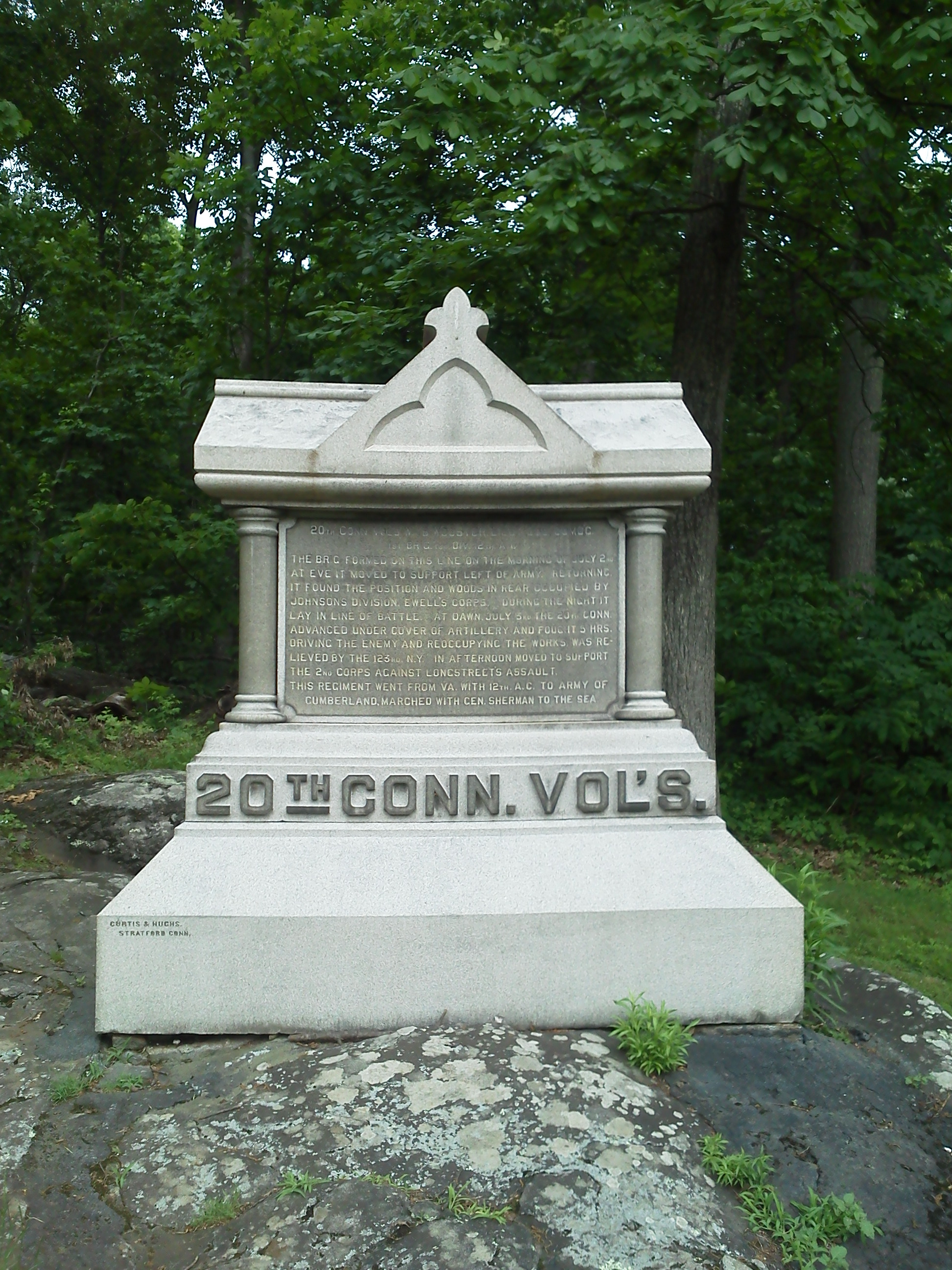
- Monument to the regiment at Gettysburg
- Active: 1862–1865
- Disbanded: 13 June 1865
- Country: United States
- Allegiance: Union
- Branch: Union Army
- Type: Infantry
- Size: Regiment
- Equipment: 1861 Springfield
- Engagements: American Civil War: Battle of Chancellorsville; Battle of Gettysburg; Buzzard's Roost Gap; Boyd's Trail; Battle of Resaca; Battle of Adairsville; Battle of Peachtree Creek; Siege of Atlanta; Sherman's March to the Sea; Battle of Bentonville

Commanders
- Notable commanders: Colonel Samuel Ross; Lt. Col. William Wooster

The 20th Connecticut Infantry Regiment was an infantry regiment of the Union Army during the American Civil War. Formed in July 1862, the regiment served in both the eastern and western theaters until it was disbanded after the war ended.

== History ==
Raised in July 1862, upon formation the 20th Connecticut Infantry Regiment was placed under the command of Colonel Samuel Ross, a former Regular Army officer. With him becoming brigade commander soon afterwards; for most of the war the regiment was commanded by its Lieutenant Colonel, William Wooster. Wooster was a businessman in civilian life and more popular than the stern disciplinarian Ross. The regiment became part of the 1st Division XII Corps and had its baptism of fire at the Battle of Chancellorsville. On May 2, 1863, at Chancellorsville, the unit suffered heavy casualties as they and other units of the XII Corps bore the brunt of Confederate General Stonewall Jackson's surprise assault.

On July 2, 1863, on the second day of the Battle of Gettysburg, several units were moved from the Union right flank on Culp's Hill to the south to reinforce the left flank which was being attacked. Seeing an opportunity, Confederate General Richard S. Ewell launched an attack on Culp's Hill and his men occupied the earthworks deserted by the withdrawn units. Attempts were made to retake the fortifications, but due to miscommunications, such attempts were unsuccessful and resulted in heavy Union casualties.

At dawn on July 3, 1863, the commander of the Confederate Army of Northern Virginia, General Robert E. Lee, devised a plan to launch a massive assault on the center of the Union line (an attack now known as Pickett's Charge). This plan also called for Ewell's troops to renew their assault on Culp's Hill to keep any Union regiments from leaving that area to reinforce the assault's target area. Long before Pickett's men were ready to make the charge, Ewell's men, still occupying the earthworks, awoke to a ferocious artillery barrage from Union batteries nearby. Forced into action by the bombardment, Ewell sent a message back to Lee saying that he could not wait for the main assault to begin to attack, and was sending his troops into battle.

The 20th Connecticut was tasked with scouting the movements of the enemy and relaying that information to nearby batteries and did so while entrenched in the woods overlooking the Confederate positions. It was a dangerous task as they had to be close to the target in order to give accurate reports and several men of the 20th were killed or wounded due to misfires or faulty ammunition. The last one to be wounded was Private George W. Warner, who lost both of his arms when a misfired shell detonated above him. The infuriated Wooster sent back a report to the batteries which allegedly said that if one more of his men were injured from a misfire, he would pull the 20th out of position, turn them around, and charge the batteries himself. The courier who carried the message added the comment, "...he'd do it, too, so be careful." The Union artillery fire proved to be devastating. A following infantry assault drove Ewell's men from the hill. Confederate counterattacks, while outnumbering the entrenched defenders, were repulsed and suffered heavy losses.

This was one of the first times that an infantry unit was used as spotting force for artillery. Citing the effectiveness, the tactic was used by several other Union generals throughout the rest of the war, including Ulysses S. Grant and William T. Sherman. It later became a common practice in the army and is still being employed today.

After Gettysburg, the XII Corps was transferred to the western theater. In April 1864, the XI and the XII Corps were reformed into the XX Corps. With it the 20th Connecticut took part in a number of campaigns and battles including the Atlanta Campaign, Sherman's March to the Sea and the Battle of Bentonville. The regiment marched as part of the Grand Review of the Armies in Washington, D.C., and was mustered out on June 13, 1865.

== See also ==
- List of Connecticut Civil War units
