= 107th Illinois Infantry Regiment =

107th Illinois Volunteer Infantry Regiment
- Active: September 4, 1862 – June 25, 1865
- Disbanded: June 25, 1865
- Country: United States
- Allegiance: Union
- Branch: Infantry
- Size: Regiment
- Engagements: American Civil War: Knoxville Campaign; Atlanta campaign; Battle of Resaca; Battle of Kennesaw Mountain; Battle of Franklin; Battle of Nashville

The 107th Illinois Volunteer Infantry Regiment was raised as part of the call for 300,000 volunteers in the summer and fall of 1862. It was organized on September 4, 1862, at Camp Butler near Springfield, Illinois, and was composed of men from DeWitt, Piatt, and Williamson Counties in central and southern Illinois.

== History ==
The 107th Illinois left Camp Butler on September 30, 1862, and arrived at Jeffersonville, Indiana, where the officers were admonished that the men were a poorly trained lot. This resulted in the regiment being held back in camp until October 12 while it was rigidly trained and prepared to head to the front.

Crossing the Ohio River at Louisville, Kentucky, the regiment joined the Army of the Ohio commanded by General Don Carlos Buell. The army had just fought a tactically indecisive but strategically important action at the Battle of Perryville a week before. On October 18 the regiment was ordered to Elizabethtown, Kentucky (near the birthplace of President Abraham Lincoln) to repel a raid by Confederate cavalry under John Hunt Morgan. Here the Illinoisans received their baptism of fire, resulting in no reported casualties and the capture of several Rebels. The 107th spent the winter of 1862–1863 around Munfordville, Kentucky.

In June 1863, the 107th was attached to XXIII Corps under command of Major General Ambrose Burnside. The regiment spent much of the summer of 1863 trying to chase down John Hunt Morgan and his band of Confederate raiders and participated in the capture of approximately 700 Rebels at Buffington Island, Ohio. Then they were sent to eastern Tennessee where they patrolled the area and confronted enemy troops under James Longstreet at Loudon, Tennessee, in early November. Longstreet's troops pushed northward and directly threatened the city of Knoxville until the Federals were reinforced by troops under William T. Sherman. The 107th participated in skirmishes at Campbell's Station on November 16 and Dandridge on December 21.

On April 30, 1864, the 107th and the rest of the Army of the Ohio was attached to Sherman's command as it was beginning to push toward Atlanta. On May 14 and 15 they participated in the Battle of Resaca, suffering only minor casualties. Throughout the month of June the men participated in the fighting around Marietta, Georgia, including the bloody assaults on Kennesaw Mountain. They served in the trenches during the Battle of Atlanta in July and August and took part in the occupation of Decatur, Georgia in September.

In late September John Bell Hood led his Army of Tennessee northward, hoping to draw Sherman out of Georgia by launching an offensive into Union-occupied Tennessee. The 107th and the rest of the Army of the Ohio under General John M. Schofield started north in pursuit. They passed over their old battlefields of Kennesaw Mountain and Resaca before being carried by rail to Nashville, Tennessee, in early November 1864. On November 18 their division, commanded by Brigadier General Thomas Ruger advanced to Columbia, Tennessee, to meet Hood's army. The regiment participated in skirmishing with Hood's army along the Duck River until November 28 when the army was ordered to retreat to Franklin, Tennessee. During the retreat, they participated in skirmishing along the Columbia Pike during the night of November 29 at the Battle of Spring Hill. The following day the army was in a defensive position surrounding Franklin, with Schofield hoping to delay Hood long enough for Union strength to be concentrated at Nashville. During the Battle of Franklin the regiment was near the apex of the Confederate assault and suffered heavy casualties, including the mortal wounding of their commander, Colonel Francis H. Lowrey. The 107th captured two stands of enemy colors and briefly suffered the loss of their own regimental colors, but they were recovered. During the night after the battle, Schofield's army retreated to Nashville and the regiment took a position near Fort Negley outside of Nashville. They performed skirmish and picket during the first two weeks of December and took part in the massive Federal assault on December 15 that resulted in the destruction of Hood's army.

Remaining around Columbia, Tennessee, until late January, the regiment was then ordered to Washington, D.C. and then to Fort Fisher, North Carolina. They moved against Fort Anderson (North Carolina) and in a sharp skirmish captured the fort's colors. During March 1865 they served on guard duty in and around Wilmington, North Carolina, and rejoined Sherman's army near Goldsboro in April. After the surrender of Johnston's Confederate forces on April 26, the regiment remained on occupation duty in Salisbury, North Carolina, until June 21, 1865, when they were mustered-out. On July 2 the men arrived at Camp Butler, where they received their final pay and were discharged.

== Casualties ==
Killed: 3 Officers and 27 Enlisted men

Died of disease: 122 Enlisted men

Total deaths: 152

== Organization ==
Department of the Ohio: October–November 1862

District of West Kentucky: November 1862-June 1863

First Brigade, Third Division, 23rd Army Corps, Army of the Ohio: June–August 1863

Second Brigade, Second Division, 23rd Army Corps, Army of the Ohio: August 1863-February 1865

Department of North Carolina: February–June 1865

== See also ==
- List of Illinois Civil War Units
