= Samuel Woodson Price =

American painter

- Colonel Samuel Woodson Price, ca. 1863
- Born: August 5, 1828; Jessamine County, Kentucky
- Died: January 22, 1918 (aged 89); St. Louis, Missouri
- Burial place: Arlington National Cemetery, Arlington, Virginia
- Military career
- Allegiance: United States of America
- Branch: Kentucky State Guard; Union Army
- Service years: 1861–1865
- Rank: Colonel; Brevet Brigadier General
- Commands: 21st Kentucky Infantry Regiment
- Conflicts: American Civil War: Battle of Perryville; Battle of Stones River; Battle of Resaca; Battle of Kennesaw Mountain
- Other work: portrait artist, postmaster of Lexington, Kentucky

Samuel Woodson Price (August 5, 1828 – January 22, 1918) was a portraitist, author and Union Army officer in the American Civil War.

== Early life ==
Price was born near Nicholasville, Kentucky, to Daniel Branch and Elizabeth (Crockett) Price. He began to show great aptitude for art at an early age, having set up a studio in a Nicholasville hotel by the age of fourteen. Price attended Nicholasville Academy and later attended Kentucky Military Institute near Frankfort. While a student, he even taught drawing to other students.

== Art education and personal life ==
For a time, Price studied portrait painting with William Reading, an artist in Louisville, Kentucky, and later with Oliver Frazer in Lexington, Kentucky. In 1849, Price left Kentucky for New York City where he enrolled in the School of Design and studied for five months. The following year, Price had reopened his studio in Lexington, but he was persuaded to move to Louisville by a prominent citizen in 1851. One of his most notable students was Thomas Satterwhite Noble, who studied with him in 1852.

In 1853, Price married Mary Frances Thompson. Together they had a son and two daughters. Price traveled extensively through Kentucky, Tennessee, and other states throughout the 1850s, painting portraits of prominent citizens. In 1859, he once again relocated to Lexington. While living there, Price became a captain and commander of "The Old Infantry", a state guard unit.

== Civil War ==
Although many other Kentucky State Guard units would join the Confederacy, Price and the men of "The Old Infantry" helped form the 21st Kentucky Infantry Regiment. Price enlisted as a corporal, but soon rose to the rank of captain. On February 26, 1862, he was made colonel and led the regiment through many of the major campaigns in the western theater. Price was wounded at the Battle of Kennesaw Mountain on June 27, 1864, when his regiment captured and held the Moulton and Dallas Road while being greatly outnumbered. He recovered from his wound and was subsequently assigned as post commander of Lexington, a position he held until the war ended. Price was mustered out of the U.S. volunteers on December 9, 1865. In recognition of his service and especially his leadership at Kennesaw Mountain, on January 30, 1867 (and again on March 23, 1867) President Andrew Johnson nominated Price for appointment as a brevet brigadier general of volunteers, to rank from March 13, 1865, and the United States Senate confirmed the appointment on March 28, 1867.

== Later life and death ==
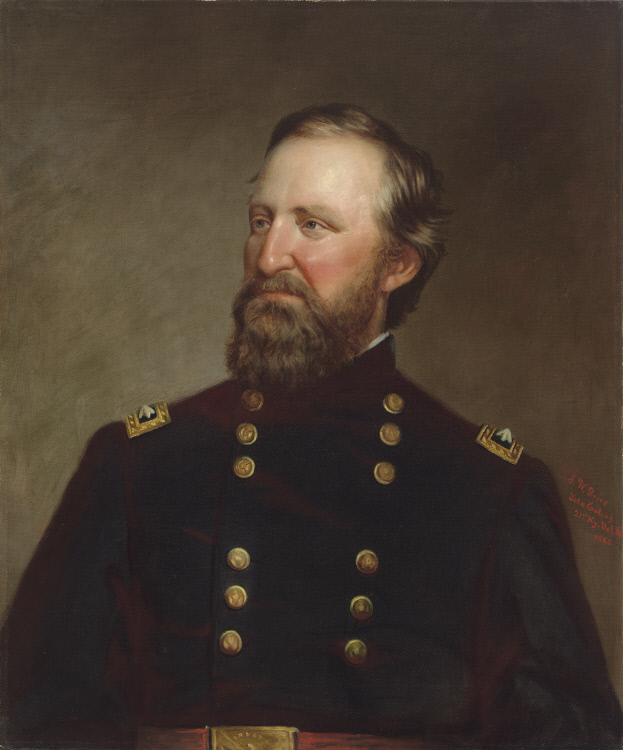
Maj. Gen. William S. Rosecrans by S. W. Price, 1868

Price relocated to Washington, D.C. soon after the Civil War where he received commissions to paint portraits of generals George H. Thomas and William S. Rosecrans. In 1869 he was appointed postmaster of Lexington where he spent a great deal of his time painting on the upper floor of the post office building. President Ulysses S. Grant removed Price from this position in April 1876.

Facing mounting financial debt, Price once again moved to Louisville in 1878 where he established a studio in the Louisville Courier-Journal office building. Two years later, Price became blind in one eye, and by 1881 he was totally blind in both eyes. Undeterred, he dictated a history of the 21st Kentucky Infantry in 1882, which was published as part of The Union Regiments of Kentucky in 1897. He also wrote The Old Masters of the Bluegrass, which was published by the Filson Club in 1902 and Biographical Sketch of Colonel Joseph Crockett in 1909.

His wife died in 1892 and he lived with his son, Robert Coleman Price, in Louisville and St. Louis, Missouri. Price died in St. Louis on January 22, 1918, and was buried in Arlington National Cemetery.

== See also ==
- List of American Civil War brevet generals
- 21st Regiment Kentucky Volunteer Infantry
