= 17th Missouri Infantry Regiment =

- Active: August 1861 to October 1864
- Country: United States
- Allegiance: Union
- Branch: Infantry
- Nickname: Western Turner Rifles
- Engagements: Battle of Pea Ridge; Battle of Whitney's Lane; Yazoo Pass Expedition; Battle of Chickasaw Bayou; Battle of Chickasaw Bluff; Battle of Arkansas Post; Siege of Vicksburg, May 19 & May 22 assaults Siege of Jackson; Chattanooga campaign Battle of Lookout Mountain; Battle of Missionary Ridge; Atlanta Campaign; Battle of Resaca; Battle of Dallas; Battle of New Hope Church; Battle of Allatoona; Battle of Atlanta; Siege of Atlanta; Battle of Jonesborough; Battle of Lovejoy's Station; Sherman's March to the Sea

The 17th Missouri Infantry Regiment was an infantry regiment that served in the Union Army during the American Civil War.

== Service ==
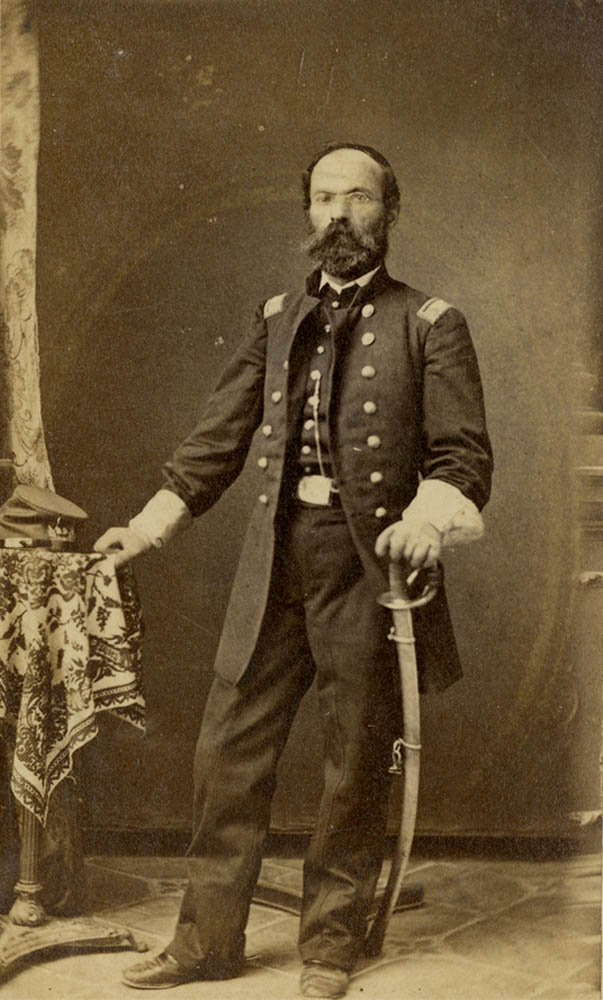
Franz Hassendeubel

The 17th Missouri Infantry Regiment was organized at St. Louis, Missouri in August 1861 and mustered in for three years service under the command of Colonel Franz Hassendeubel.

The regiment was attached to Army of the West to January 1862. 2nd Brigade, Army of Southwest Missouri, to March 1862. 1st Brigade, 1st Division, Army of Southwest Missouri, to May 1862. 3rd Division, Army of Southwest Missouri, to July 1862. District of Eastern Arkansas, Department of the Missouri, to November 1862. 1st Brigade, 1st Division, District of Eastern Arkansas to December 1862. 1st Brigade, 11th Division, XIII Corps, Department of the Tennessee, to December 1862. 2nd Brigade, 4th Division, Sherman's Yazoo Expedition, to January 1863. 2nd Brigade, 1st Division, XV Corps, Army of the Tennessee, to September 1863. 1st Brigade, 1st Division, XV Corps, to December 1863. 3rd Brigade, 1st Division, XV Corps, to December 1864.

The regiment mustered out September through October 1864. Veterans and recruits were transferred to the 15th Missouri Infantry.

== Detailed service ==
Fremont's Campaign against Springfield, Mo., October–November 1861. Duty at Rolla, Mo., until January 1862. Curtis' Campaign against Price in Missouri and Arkansas January to March. Advance on Springfield February 2–14. Pursuit of Price into Arkansas February 14–29. Battle of Pea Ridge, Ark., March 6–8. March to Batesville, Ark., April 5-May 3. Searcy Landing May 19. March to Helena, Ark., May 25-July 14. Expedition from Helena to mouth of White River August 5–8. Moved to Ironton and Pilot Knob, Mo., September 1. To St. Genevieve November 12 and return to Helena November 23. Sherman's Yazoo Expedition December 22, 1862 to January 3, 1863. Chickasaw Bayou December 26–28. Chickasaw Bluff December 29. Expedition to Arkansas Post, Ark., January 3–10, 1863. Assault and capture of Fort Hindman, Arkansas Post, January 10–11. Moved to Young's Point, La., January 17–23, and duty there until March, and at Milliken's Bend until April. Expedition to Greenville. Black Bayou and Deer Creek April 2–14. Demonstration on Haines' and Drumgould's Bluffs April 29-May 2. Moved to join the army in rear of Vicksburg, Miss., via Richmond and Grand Gulf May 2–14. Mississippi Springs May 12–13. Jackson May 14. Siege of Vicksburg May 18-July 4. Assaults on Vicksburg May 19 and 22. Advance on Jackson, Miss., July 4–10. Siege of Jackson July 10–17. Bolton's Depot July 16. Brier Creek, near Canton, July 17. Canton July 18. At Big Black until September 27. Moved to Memphis, Tenn.; then marched to Chattanooga, Tenn., September 27-November 21. Operations on Memphis & Charleston Railroad in Alabama October 20–29. Cherokee Station October 21 and 29. Cane Creek October 26. Tuscumbia October 26–27. Chattanooga-Ringgold Campaign November 23–27. Battle of Lookout Mountain November 23–24. Missionary Ridge November 25. Ringgold Gap, Taylor's Ridge, November 27. March to relief of Knoxville, Tenn., November 28-December 8. Garrison duty in Alabama until May, 1864. Atlanta Campaign May 1 to September 8. Demonstration on Resaca May 8–13. Battle of Resaca May 13–15. Advance on Dallas May 18–25. Battles about Dallas, New Hope Church, and Allatoona Hills May 25-June 5. Operations about Marietta and against Kennesaw Mountain June 10-July 2. Nickajack Creek July 2–5. Chattahoochie River July 6–17. Battle of Atlanta July 22. Siege of Atlanta July 22-August 25. Ezra Chapel, Hood's 2nd Sortie, July 28. Flank movement on Jonesborough August 25–30. Lovejoy's Station September 2–6. Operations against Hood in northern Georgia and northern Alabama October 1–21. March to the sea November 15-December 10.

== Casualties ==
The regiment lost a total of 219 men during service; 6 officers and 62 enlisted men killed or mortally wounded, 3 officers and 148 enlisted men died of disease.

== Commanders ==
- Colonel Franz Hassendeubel - mortally wounded in action at Vicksburg, July 2, 1863
- Colonel John F. Cramer

== See also ==
- Missouri Civil War Union units
- Missouri in the Civil War
