= 56th Illinois Infantry Regiment =

56th Regiment Illinois Volunteer Infantry
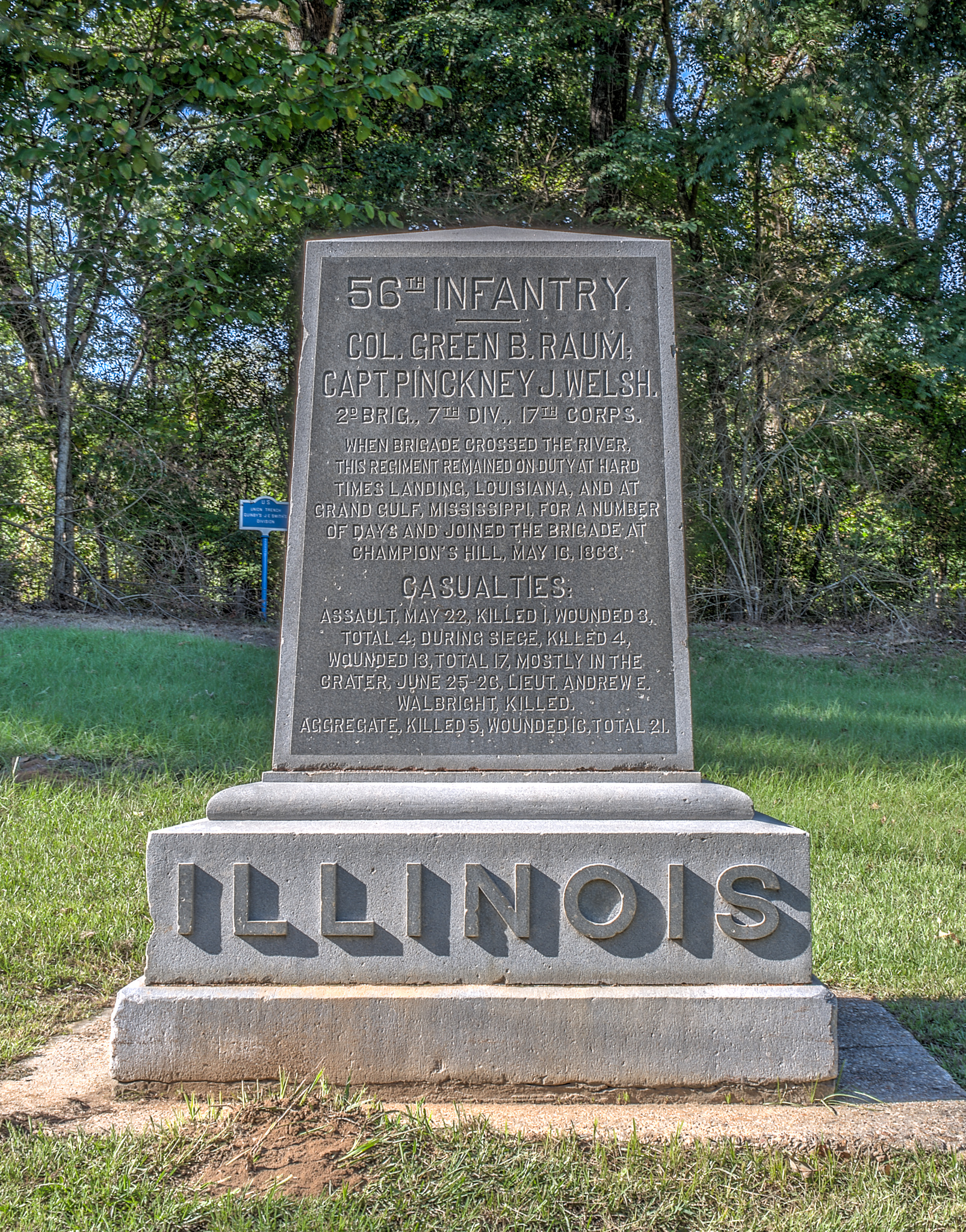
- Monument to 56th Illinois Infantry Regiment at Vicksburg National Military Park
- Active: February 27, 1862, to August 12, 1865
- Country: United States
- Allegiance: Union
- Branch: Infantry
- Engagements: Battle of Corinth; Battle of Champion's Hill; Battle of Big Black River; Siege of Vicksburg; March to the Sea; Battle of Bentonville

The 56th Regiment Illinois Volunteer Infantry was an infantry regiment that served in the Union Army during the American Civil War.

== Service ==
The 56th Illinois Infantry was organized at Shawneetown, Illinois and mustered into Federal service on February 27, 1862. The 56th was typically placed near the 10th Missouri in Battle plans.

The regiment was mustered out on August 12, 1865.

== Action ==
Moved from Paducah, Ky., to Hamburg Landing, Tenn., April 20–25, 1862. Advance on and siege of Corinth, Miss., April 29-May 30. Pursuit to Booneville May 31-June 12. Expedition to Ripley June 22–23. At Camp Clear Creek till October, 1862. Battle of Corinth October 3–4. Pursuit to Ripley October 5–12. Grant's Central Mississippi Campaign November 4 to December 30. Reconnaissance from LaGrange November 8–9. Guard Memphis & Charleston R. R. till March 1, 1863. Yazoo Pass Expedition March 1-April 5. Fort Pemberton March 22. Moved to Milliken's Bend. La., April 13. Movement on Bruinsburg and turning Grand Gulf April 25–30. At Grand Gulf guarding transportation lines and base of supplies May 1–13. Battle of Champion's Hill May 16. Big Black River May 17. Siege of Vicksburg, Miss., May 18-July 4. Assaults on Vicksburg May 19 and 22 and June 25. Surrender of Vicksburg July 4. Moved to Helena, Ark., August 20; thence to Memphis, Tenn., and march to Chattanooga, Tenn., September 20-November 23. Operations on Memphis & Charleston R.R. in Alabama October 20–29. Chattanooga-Ringgold Campaign November 23–27. Tunnel Hill November 24–25. Mission Ridge November 25. Pursuit to Graysville November 26–27. Guard railroad and duty at Whitesburg, on Tennessee River, till May, 1864. Atlanta (Ga.) Campaign May to September. Guard Memphis & Charleston R.R. and Chattanooga & Atlanta R.R. and fords of the Etowah; stationed at Mud Creek, Calhoun and Adairsville, Ga., till October. Defence of Resaca October 12–13. Company "F" at surrender of Dalton, Ga., October 13. Adairsville October 22. March to the sea November 15-December 10. Siege of Savannah December 10–21. Campaign of the Carolinas January to April, 1865. Salkwhatchie Swamps, S.C., February 2–5. Fishburn's Plantation, near Lane's Bridge, Salkehatchie River, February 6. South Edisto River February 9. North Edisto River February 11–12. Columbia February 15–17. Cox's Bridge, Neuse River, February 19–20. Battle of Bentonville, N.C., March 20–21. Occupation of Goldsboro March 24. Advance on Raleigh, N.C., April 10–14. Occupation of Raleigh April 14. Bennett's House April 26. Surrender of Johnston and his army. March to Washington, D.C., via Richmond, Va., April 29-May 19. Grand Review May 24. Moved to Louisville, Ky., June; thence to Little Rock, Ark., and duty there till August. Mustered out August 12, 1865.

== Total strength and casualties ==
The regiment suffered 2 officers and 25 enlisted men who were killed in action or mortally wounded and 14 officers and 348 enlisted men who died of disease, for a total of 389 fatalities.

== The General Lyon disaster ==
On March 31, 1865, just 26 days from the end of the war, a contingent of discharged soldiers from the regiment, including 11 officers and 190 enlisted men, were returning home on the Steamer General Lyon when the ship caught fire in heavy seas. The fire spread quickly through the ship killing most of those on board, including all but five of the contingent - a tragic and bitter end to the war for the 56th Infantry Regiment and the families of the victims. Survivors: Michael S. Brocket (his brother - Matthew - was killed in this incident), Jasper Fitzgerald, M. H. Ozment, Isaac N. Wilhite, and George W. Williams. More information regarding the 196 that perished, including possible biographies may be obtained through the General John A. Logan Museum located in Murphysboro Illinois.

== Commanders ==
- Colonel Robert Kirkham - resigned on June 26, 1862.
- Colonel William R. Brown - resigned August 31, 1862.
- Colonel Green B. Raum - of Pope County Illinois - mustered out March 3, 1865.
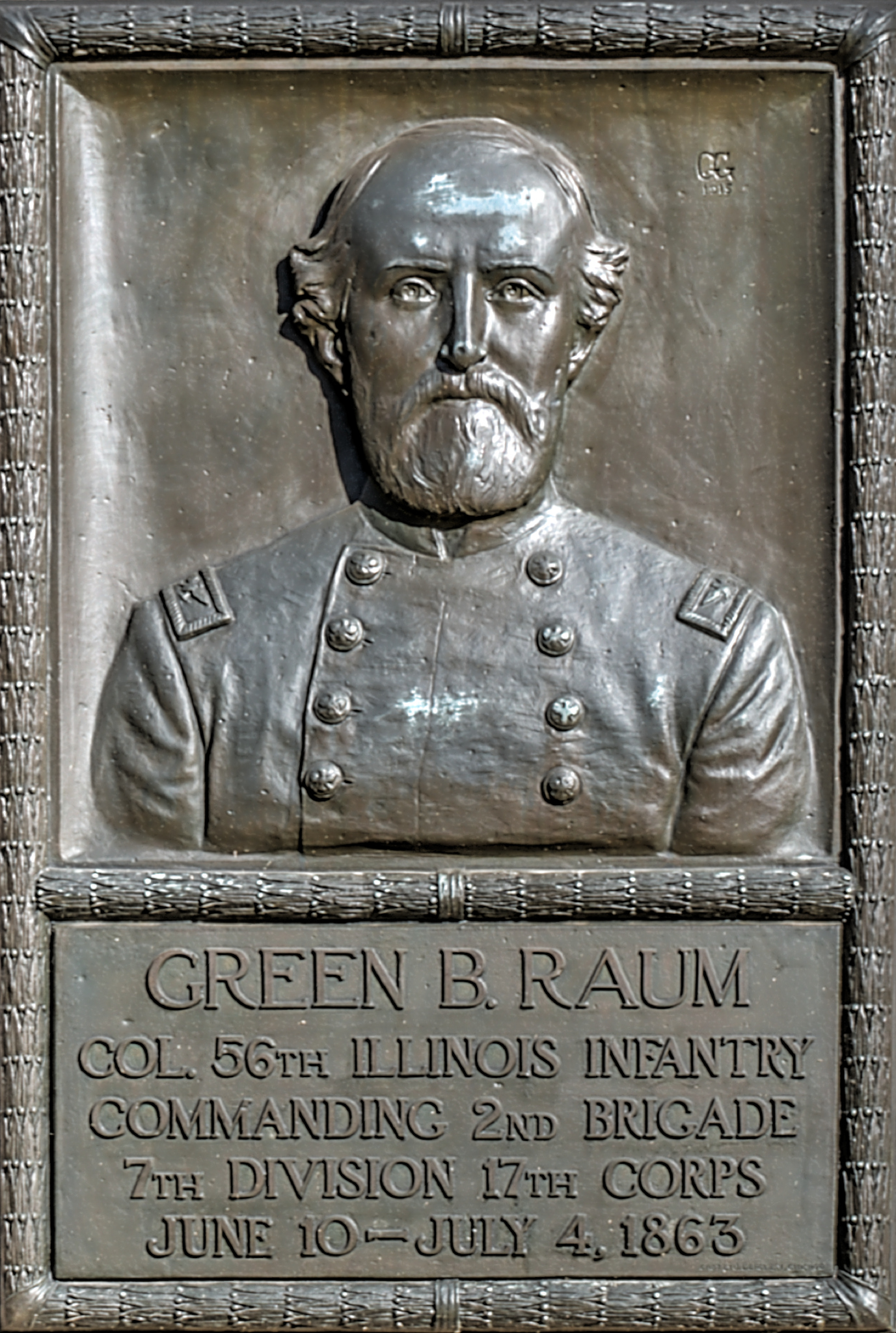
Bronze relief portrait of Colonel Green B. Raum at Vicksburg National Military Park

== See also ==
- List of Illinois Civil War Units
- Illinois in the American Civil War
