= 21st Kentucky Infantry Regiment =

- Active: December 31, 1861, to December 9, 1865
- Country: United States
- Allegiance: Union
- Branch: Infantry
- Engagements: Battle of Perryville; Battle of Stones River; Tullahoma Campaign; Battle of Missionary Ridge; Atlanta campaign Battle of Resaca; Battle of Kennesaw Mountain; Siege of Atlanta; Battle of Jonesboro; Battle of Franklin; Battle of Nashville

The 21st Kentucky Infantry Regiment was an infantry regiment that served in the Union Army during the American Civil War.

== Service ==
The 21st Kentucky Infantry Regiment was organized at Camp Hobson, near Greensburg, Kentucky and Camp Ward, Kentucky and mustered in for a three-year enlistment on December 31, 1861, and January 2, 1862, at Green River Bridge, Kentucky, under the command of Colonel Ethelbert Ludlow Dudley. Before the war, most of the regiment's men were members of "The Old Infantry" a state guard unit under the command of Captain Samuel Woodson Price, who would later command the regiment.

The regiment was attached to 11th Brigade, 1st Division, Army of the Ohio, to March 1862. 11th Brigade, 5th Division, Army of the Ohio, to June 1862. 7th Independent Brigade, Army of the Ohio, to July 1862. 23rd Independent Brigade, Army of the Ohio, to August 1862. 23rd Brigade, 5th Division, Army of the Ohio, to September 1862. 23rd Brigade, 5th Division, II Corps, Army of the Ohio, to November 1862. 3rd Brigade, 3rd Division, Left Wing, XIV Corps, Army of the Cumberland, to January 1863. 3rd Brigade, 3rd Division, XXI Corps, Army of the Cumberland, to October 1863. Unattached, Army of the Cumberland, to January 1864. 2nd Brigade, 1st Division, IV Corps, to June 1865. 1st Brigade, 1st Division, IV Corps, to August 1865. Department of Texas to December 1865.

The 21st Kentucky Infantry mustered out of service on December 9, 1865.

== Casualties ==
The regiment lost a total of 218 men during service; 3 officers and 57 enlisted men killed or mortally wounded, 6 officers and 152 enlisted men died of disease.

== Commanders ==
- Colonel Ethelbert Ludlow Dudley
- Colonel Samuel Woodson Price
- Lieutenant Colonel James C. Evans - commanded at the battle of Nashville

== See also ==
- List of Kentucky Civil War Units
- Kentucky in the Civil War
