= 119th New York Infantry Regiment =

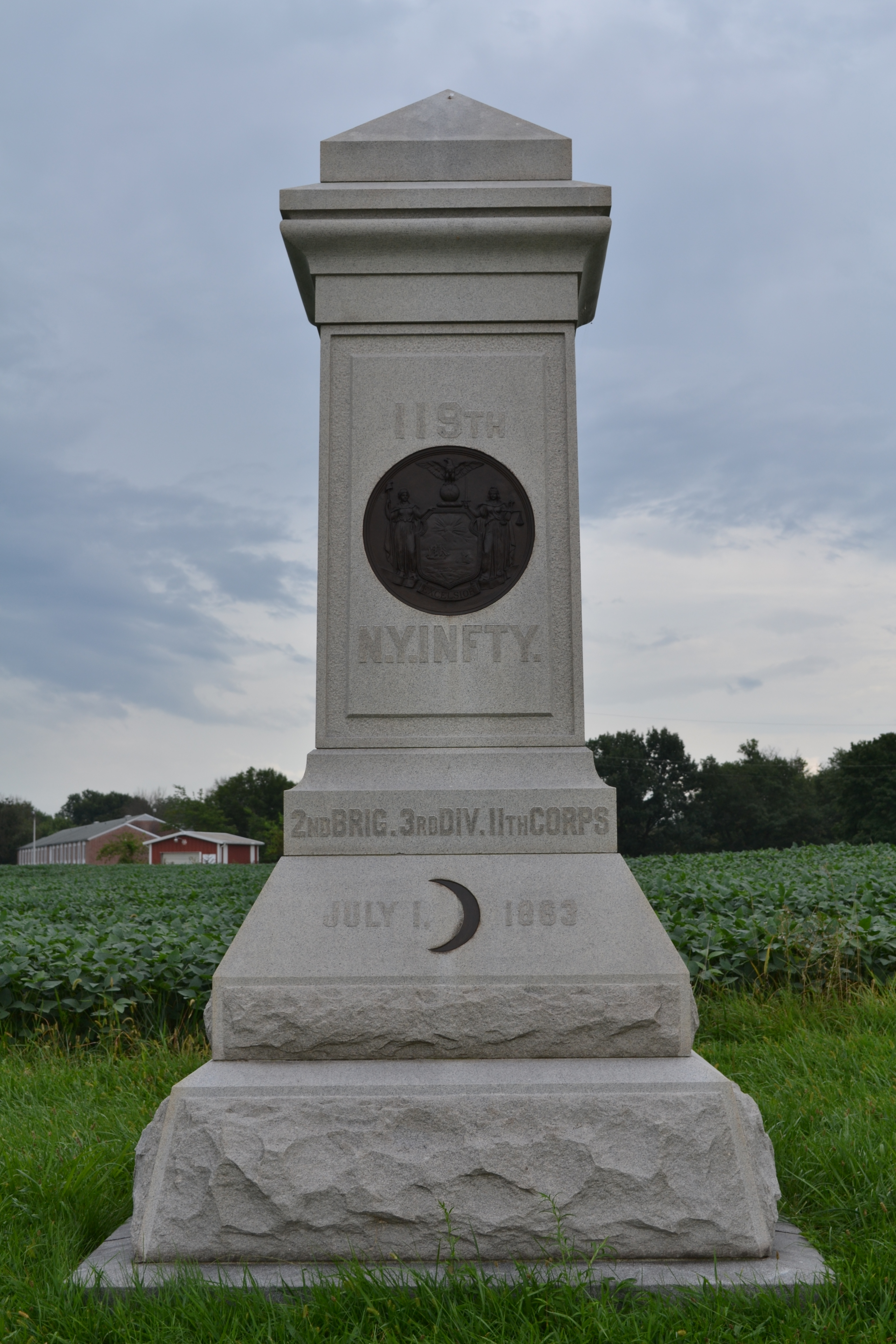
- 119th New York Infantry monument at Gettysburg Battlefield
- Active: June 26, 1862 – June 7, 1865
- Country: United States
- Allegiance: Union
- Branch: Infantry
- Engagements: American Civil War: Battle of Chancellorsville; Battle of Gettysburg; Battle of Wauhatchie; Battle of Missionary Ridge; Atlanta campaign; Battle of Resaca; Battle of Dallas; Battle of New Hope Church; Battle of Allatoona; Battle of Pine Hill; Battle of Marietta; Battle of Kolb's Farm; Battle of Kennesaw Mountain; Battle of Peachtree Creek; Siege of Atlanta; Sherman's March to the Sea; Carolinas campaign; Battle of Bentonville

Commanders
- Colonel: Elias Peissner
- Colonel: John Thomas Lockman
- Lieutenant Colonel: Edward F. Lloyd

Insignia
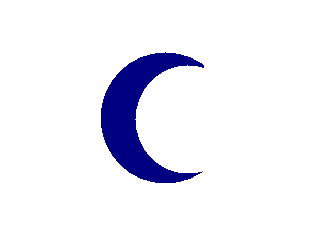
- 2nd Division, XI Corps

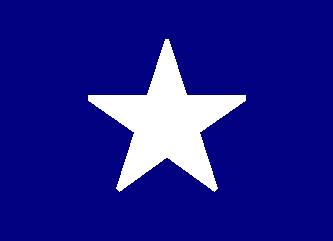
- 2nd Division, XX Corps

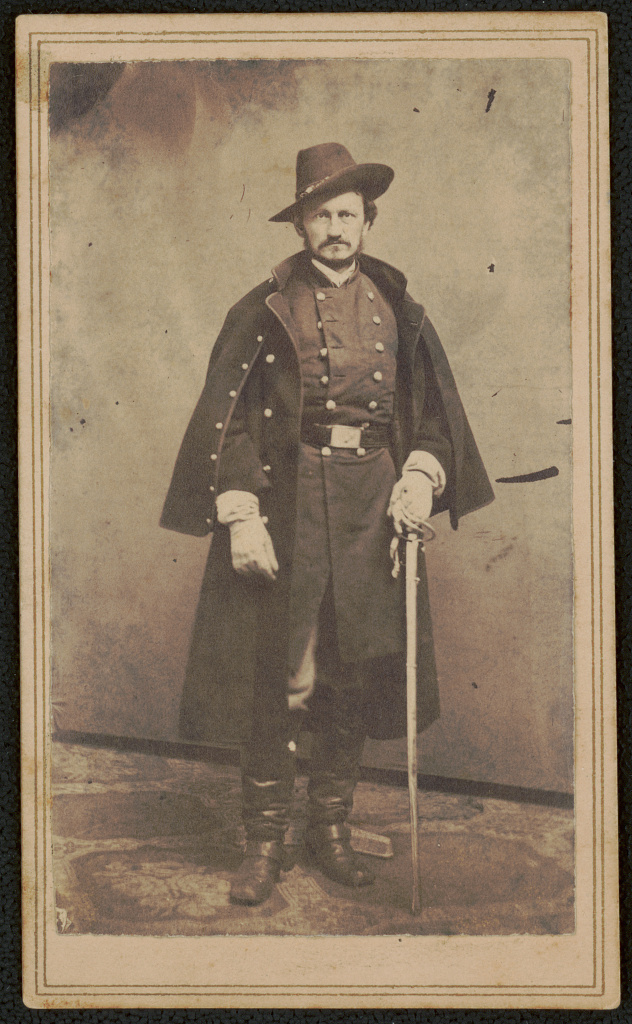
Colonel Elias Peissner

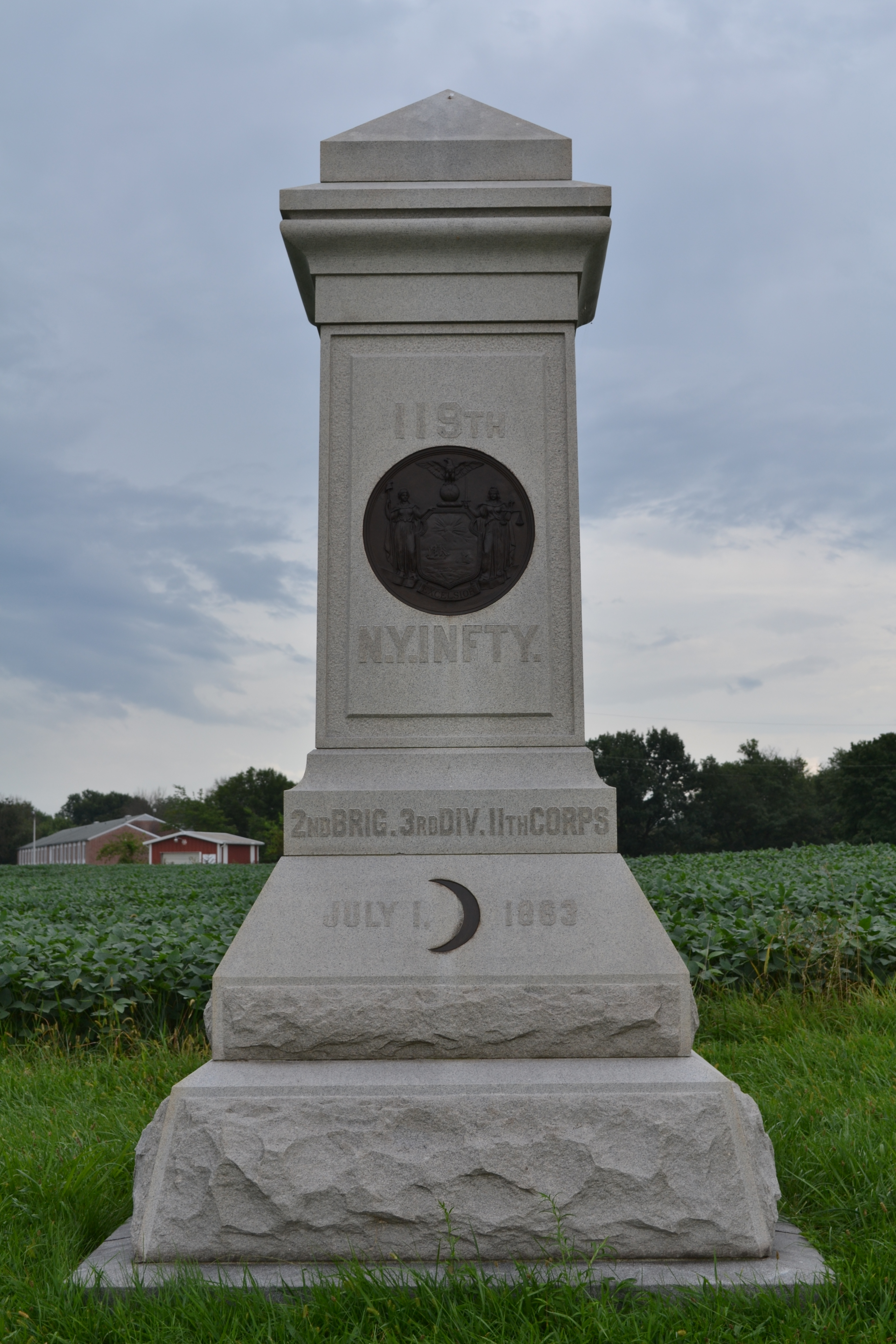
119th New York Infantry monument at Gettysburg Battlefield

The 119th New York Infantry Regiment was an infantry regiment in the Union Army during the American Civil War.

== Service ==
Colonel Elias Peissner (Note: Peissner was a 35-year-old German immigrant, who was appointed Colonel, June 26, 1862. He commanded the regiment until he was killed in action, May 2, 1863, at Chancellorsville.) received authority, June 26, 1862, to recruit 119th New York Infantry was organized at New York City, New York beginning June 26, 1862 and mustered in for three years service on September 4, 1862 under the command of Elias Peissner. The companies were recruited principally:

- A — Halleck Guard
- B, C, D — Sigel Life Guard, Siegel Sharpshooters
- E, F, G, I and K — New York City
- H — Hempstead

The regiment was considered one of the German, or "Dutch," regiments in the XI Corps. The historian, Theodore Ayrault Dodge, joined it as regimental adjutant in November 1862, and wrote: "There are Germans who don't understand English, Frenchmen ditto, Swedes and Spaniards who don't understand anything, and Italians who are worse than all the rest together." (Note: Many native-born Americans in the U.S. Army initially harbored some disdain for immigrants, but Dodge was sent to the regiment because he had studied in Berlin before the war and was fluent in German.)

The 119th was part of Hooker's command (XI and XII Corps) that transferred from the Army of the Potomac westward to reinforce the Army of the Cumberland around Chattanooga, Tennessee. (Note: The efficiency of the United States' railroads over the Confederacy's effectively canceled the normal advantage of interior lines of communications that the Rebels possessed. While traveling 400 miles further with slightly more than twice the number, the troops had taken the same time as Longstreet's troops who had arrived two weeks earlier still lacking arms and supplies.) They then became the part of the Army of the Tennessee and remained with it until the end of the war.

The 119th New York Infantry mustered out of service June 8, 1865 near Bladensburg, Maryland. Recruits and veterans were transferred to the 102nd New York Volunteer Infantry.

== Affiliations, battle honors, detailed service, and casualties ==
=== Organizational affiliation ===
The regiment was attached to the following brigades:

- Defenses of Washington, D.C., to November 1862
- 1st Brigade, 3rd Division, XI Corps, Army of the Potomac, to October 1863
- 2nd Brigade, 2nd Division, XX Corps Army of the Cumberland, to June 1865.

=== List of battles ===
The official list of battles in which the regiment bore a part:

- Battle of Chancellorsville
- Battle of Gettysburg
- Battle of Wauhatchie
- Battle of Missionary Ridge
- Atlanta campaign
- Battle of Resaca
- Battle of Dallas
- Battle of New Hope Church
- Battle of Allatoona
- Battle of Pine Hill
- Battle of Marietta
- Battle of Kolb's Farm
- Battle of Kennesaw Mountain
- Battle of Peachtree Creek
- Siege of Atlanta
- Sherman's March to the Sea
- Carolinas campaign
- Battle of Bentonville

=== Detailed service ===
==== 1862 ====
- Left New York for Washington, D.C., September 6, 1862.
- Duty in the defenses of Washington, D.C., until November 1862.
- Movement to Gainesville, Virginia, November 1–9, then to Centreville November 18, and to Falmouth December 9–16.
- At Stafford Court House until January 20, 1863.

==== 1863 ====
- "Mud March", January 20–24.
- At Stafford Court House until April 27.
  - Chancellorsville Campaign, April 27 – May 6.
  - Battle of Chancellorsville May 1–5.
- Gettysburg Campaign, June 11 – July 24.
  - Battle of Gettysburg, July 1–3.
  - Pursuit of Lee to Manassas Gap, Virginia, July 5–24.
- Guard duty on Orange & Alexandria Railroad until September.
- Movement to Bridgeport, Alabama, September 24 – October 3.
- Duty there and in Lookout Valley until November 22.
- Reopening Tennessee River, October 26–29.
- Battle of Wauhatchie, Tennessee, October 28–29.
- Chattanooga-Ringgold Campaign, November 23–27.
  - Orchard Knob, November 23.
  - Battle of Lookout Mountain November 24
  - Tunnel Hill November 24–25.
  - Missionary Ridge, November 25.
- March to relief of Knoxville, November 28 – December 17.
- Duty in Alabama until April 1864.

==== 1864 ====
- Atlanta Campaign, May 1 – September 8.
- Operations against Rocky Faced Ridge, May 8–11.
- Mill Creek or Dug Gap, May 8.
- Battle of Resaca, May 14–15.
- Near Cassville, May 19.
- New Hope Church, May 25.
- Battles about Dallas, New Hope Church, and Allatoona Hills, May 26 – June 5.
- Operations about Marietta and against Kennesaw Mountain, June 10 – July 2.
- Pine Hill, June 11–14.
- Lost Mountain, June 15–17.
- Gilgal or Golgotha Church, June 15.
- Muddy Creek, June 17.
- Noyes Creek, June 19.
- Kolk's Farm, June 22.
- Assault on Kennesaw, June 27.
- Ruff's Station, Smyrna Camp Ground, July 4.
- Chattahoochie River, July 5–17.
- Peachtree Creek, July 19–20.
- Siege of Atlanta, July 22–August 25.
- Operations at Chattahoochie River Bridge, August 26 – September 2.
- Occupation of Atlanta, September 2 to November 15.
- Expedition from Atlanta to Tuckum's Cross Roads, October 26–29.
- Near Atlanta, November 9.
- March to the sea, November 15 – December 10.
- Between Eden and Pooler's Stations, December 9.
- Siege of Savannah, December 10–21.

==== 1865 ====
- Carolinas Campaign, January to April 1865.
- Battle of Bentonville, North Carolina, March 19–21.
- Occupation of Goldsboro, March 24.
- Advance on Raleigh, April 9–13.
- Smithfield, North Carolina, April 11.
- Occupation of Raleigh, April 14.
- Bennett's House, April 26.
- Surrender of Johnston and his army.
- March to Washington, D.C., via Richmond, Virginia, April 30 – May 19.
- Grand Review of the Armies, May 24.

== Casualties ==
The regiment lost a total of 166 men during service; six officers and 66 enlisted men killed or mortally wounded, two officers and 92 enlisted men died of disease.

== Commanders ==
- Colonel Elias Peissner – killed in action at the Battle of Chancellorsville
- Colonel John Thomas Lockman
- Lieutenant Colonel Edward F. Lloyd – commanded at the Battle of Gettysburg after Col. Lockman was wounded in action on July 1

== See also ==
- List of New York Civil War regiments
- New York in the Civil War
