= 15th Missouri Infantry Regiment =

- Active: August 1861 to December 25, 1865
- Country: United States
- Allegiance: Union
- Branch: Infantry
- Engagements: Battle of Pea Ridge; Siege of Corinth; Battle of Perryville; Battle of Stones River; Tullahoma Campaign; Battle of Chickamauga; Siege of Chattanooga; Battle of Missionary Ridge; Atlanta campaign Battle of Resaca; Battle of Kennesaw Mountain; Siege of Atlanta; Battle of Jonesboro; Battle of Spring Hill; Second Battle of Franklin; Battle of Nashville

The 15th Missouri Infantry Regiment was an infantry regiment that served in the Union Army during the American Civil War.

== Service ==
The 15th Missouri Infantry Regiment was organized at St. Louis, Missouri August–September 1861 and mustered in for three years on under the command of Colonel Francis J. Joliat.

The regiment was attached to Fremont's Army of the West to January 1862. 5th Brigade, Army of Southwest Missouri, to March 1862. 1st Brigade, 2nd Division, Army of Southwest Missouri, to May 1862. 1st Brigade, 5th Division, Army of the Mississippi, to September 1862. 35th Brigade, 11th Division, Army of the Ohio, to October 1862. 35th Brigade, 11th Division, III Corps, Army of the Ohio, to November 1862. 2nd Brigade, 3rd Division, Right Wing, XIV Corps, Army of the Cumberland, to January 1863. 2nd Brigade, 3rd Division, XX Corps, Army of the Cumberland, to October 1863, 1st Brigade, 2nd Division, IV Corps, to April 1864. 3rd Brigade, 2nd Division, IV Corps, to June 1865. 2nd Brigade, 2nd Division, IV Corps, to August 1865. Department of Texas to December 1865.

The 15th Missouri Infantry mustered out of service at Victoria, Texas on December 25, 1865.

== Detailed service ==
Moved to Jefferson City, Mo., September 1861. Fremont's Campaign against Springfield, Mo., October 4-November 8, 1861. Moved to Rolla, Mo., and duty there until February 1862. Curtis' Campaign in Missouri and Arkansas against Price February and March. Advance on Springfield February 2–11. Pursuit of Price into Arkansas February 14–28. Battles of Pea Ridge, Ark., March 6–8. March to Batesville April 5-May 3. Moved to Cape Girardeau, Mo., May 11–22; thence to Pittsburg Landing, Tenn., May 23–26. Siege of Corinth May 27–30. Pursuit to Booneville May 31-June 6. At Rienzi until August 26. Moved to Cincinnati, Ohio, August 26-September 14; thence to Louisville, Ky., September 17–19. Pursuit of Bragg into Kentucky October 1–16. Battle of Perryville, Ky., October 8. March to Nashville, Tenn., October 16-November 7. Duty at Nashville until December 26. Advance on Murfreesboro December 26–30. Battle of Stones River December 30–31, 1862 and January 1–3, 1863. Duty near Murfreesboro until June. Expedition toward Columbia March 4–14. Tullahoma Campaign June 23-July 7. Fairfield June 27–29. Estill Springs July 2. Reconnaissance to Anderson July 11–14. Occupation of middle Tennessee until August 16. Passage of Cumberland Mountains and Tennessee River and Chickamauga Campaign August 16-September 22. Battle of Chickamauga September 19–20. Siege of Chattanooga September 24-November 23. Chattanooga-Ringgold Campaign November 23–27. Orchard Knob November 23–24. Missionary Ridge November 25. Pursuit to Graysville November 26–27. March to relief of Knoxville, Tenn., November 28-December 8. Operations in eastern Tennessee December 1863 to February 1864. Dandridge January 16–17, 1864. Moved to Chattanooga, thence to Cleveland, Tenn., and duty there until May 1864. Atlanta Campaign May 1-September 8. Demonstration on Rocky Faced Ridge and Dalton May 8–13. Buzzard's Roost Gap May 8–9. Battle of Resaca May 14–15. Adairsville May 17. Near Kingston May 18–19. Near Cassville May 19. Advance on Dallas May 22–25, Operations on line of Pumpkin Vine Creek and battles about Dallas, New Hope Church and Allatoona Hills May 25-June 5. Operations about Marietta and against Kennesaw Mountain June 10-July 2. Pine Hill June 11–14. Lost Mountain June 15–17. Assault on Kennesaw June 27. Ruff's Station July 4. Chattahoochie River July 5–17. Buckhead, Nancy's Creek, July 18. Peachtree Creek July 19–20. Siege of Atlanta July 22-August 25. Flank movement on Jonesboro August 25–30. Battle of Jonesboro August 31-September 1. Lovejoy's Station September 2–6. Operations against Hood and Forest in northern Georgia and northern Alabama September 29-November 3. Nashville Campaign November and December. Columbia, Duck River, November 24–27. Spring Hill November 29. Battle of Franklin November 30. Battle of Nashville December 15–16. Pursuit of Hood to the Tennessee River December 17–28. Columbia December 19. Pulaski December 25. March from Pulaski to Decatur, Ala., and duty there until April 1865. Moved to Blue Springs April 1–5, thence to Nashville, Tenn., April 19, and duty there until June. Moved to New Orleans June 15–23, and to Port Lavaca, Texas, July 18–24. Duty there until October. Moved to Victoria October 27 and duty there until December.

== Casualties ==
The regiment lost a total of 222 men during service; 8 officers and 107 enlisted men killed or mortally wounded, 1 officer and 106 enlisted men died of disease.

== Commanders ==
- Colonel Francis J. Joliat
- Colonel Joseph Conrad
- Major John Weber - commanded at the battle of Perryville
- Captain George Ernst - commanded at the battle of Nashville
- Captain John R. Hoover - commanded at the battle of Nashville
- Captain Melchior Zimmerman was at battles of Pea Ridge, Corinth, Perryville and died 31 Dec 1862 Battle of Stone's River TN

== See also ==
- Missouri Civil War Union units
- Missouri in the Civil War

== Sources ==
- Allendorf, Donald. Long Road to Liberty: The Odyssey of a German Regiment in the Yankee Army, The 15th Missouri Volunteer Infantry (Kent, OH: Kent State University Press), 2006. ISBN 0-87338-871-2
- Dyer, Frederick H. A Compendium of the War of the Rebellion (Des Moines, IA: Dyer Pub. Co.), 1908.
- Marcoot, Maurice. Five Years in the Sunny South: Reminiscences of Maurice Marcoot (S.l.: s.n.), ca. 1890.

Attribution
