= Joseph Conrad (general) =

United States Army officer (1828–1897)

- Born: Wied-Selters, Germany
- Buried: Arlington National Cemetery
- Branch: Union Army
- Conflicts: Atlanta campaign

Joseph Conrad (May 17, 1827 – July 16, 1897) was a Union American Civil War colonel who was nominated and confirmed in 1866 for appointment as a brevet brigadier general of volunteers for his service during the Atlanta campaign.

== Biography ==
He was born in Wied-Selters, Kingdom of Prussia. He graduated from the Electorate of Hesse military academy in 1848, and was a Prussian Army officer. He emigrated to the United States, where he settled in the state of Missouri.

At the beginning of the American Civil War, he enlisted in the Union Army, and was made captain of a company of the Third Missouri Infantry on April 22, 1861. He was captured at Neosho, Missouri on July 5, 1861 and was exchanged. In September 1861, he was promoted to major of the Fifteenth Missouri Infantry. He fought in the battles of Wilson's Creek, Carthage, Pea Ridge, Corinth, Perryville, Chickamauga, and Missionary Ridge.

During the Atlanta campaign, he commanded a brigade of the Army of the Cumberland at the battles of Franklin and Nashville. On January 13, 1866, President Andrew Johnson nominated Conrad for appointment to the grade of brevet brigadier general of volunteers for his service during the Atlanta campaign, to rank from March 13, 1865, and the United States Senate confirmed the appointment on March 12, 1866. He commanded the sub-district of Victoria in Texas until February 3, 1866, when he was mustered out of the volunteer service.

After the war, Conrad entered the regular army, and was commissioned captain in the 29th Infantry on July 28, 1866, was transferred to the 11th Infantry in April 1869, and served with his regiment until October 23, 1882, when he was retired with the rank of colonel. Joseph Conrad and his wife Minnie S. Conrad (1848–1898) are buried at Arlington National Cemetery.
