= Alexander C. McClurg =

American bookseller and military adviser

Alexander Caldwell McClurg
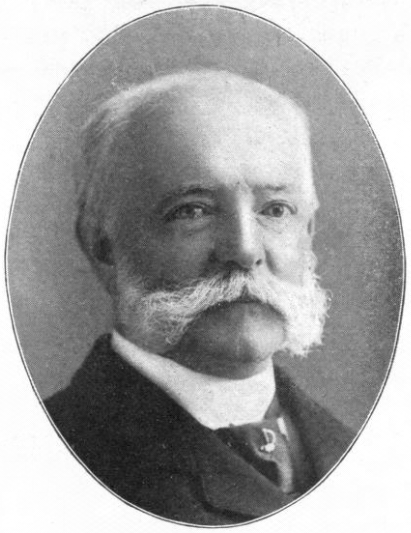
- Born: September 9, 1832; Philadelphia, Pennsylvania, US
- Died: April 15, 1901 (aged 68); Saint Augustine, Florida, US
- Burial place: Graceland Cemetery; Chicago, Illinois, US
- Military career
- Allegiance: United States of America; Union
- Branch: United States Army
- Service years: 1861–1865
- Rank: Lieutenant Colonel; Brevet Brigadier General
- Units: 88th Illinois Infantry Regiment; XIV Corps
- Conflicts: American Civil War: Battle of Perryville; Tullahoma Campaign; Chattanooga campaign; Atlanta campaign; Sherman's March to the Sea

Alexander Caldwell McClurg (September 9, 1832 – April 15, 1901) was an American bookseller and military adviser from Pennsylvania. He was raised in Pittsburgh, where his father owned a prosperous foundry. Graduating from Miami University, McClurg briefly studied law before moving to Chicago, Illinois, to join a bookselling house. During the Civil War, McClurg served as a captain with the 88th Illinois Volunteer Infantry Regiment. After his advisory skills were noticed by General Alexander McDowell McCook, McClurg spent the rest of the war as an adviser to various generals. His most prominent position was as Chief of Staff and Adjunct General to Major General Jefferson C. Davis and the XIV Corps. After the war, McClurg returned to his bookselling house as a junior partner. McClurg eventually became senior partner and the house became known as A. C. McClurg & Co.

== Biography ==
=== Early life ===
Alexander Caldwell McClurg was born in Philadelphia, Pennsylvania, on September 9, 1832, but was raised in Pittsburgh. His father, Alex McClurg, built the Fort Pitt Foundry in Pittsburgh. McClurg attended the Western University of Pennsylvania (now known as the University of Pittsburgh)until its operation was suspended due to a series of fires. He then graduated from Miami University in Oxford, Ohio. He then studied law under Walter H. Lowrie, the Chief Justice of the Pennsylvania Supreme Court. However, McClurg's declining health caused him to stop the pursuit of law and he instead turned to mercantile pursuits. He moved to Chicago, Illinois, in 1859 and joined the book-house of S. C. Griggs & Co., the leading house in the city.

=== Civil War ===
Upon the outbreak of the Civil War, McClurg enlisted as a private in Company D of the 16th Regiment Illinois State Militia. However, the regiment was deemed unnecessary and it was disbanded after a few months. McClurg briefly returned to S. C. Griggs & Co. before enlisting after a second call for troops. McClurg helped to raise a regiment called the Crosby Guards, which were merged into the 88th Illinois Volunteer Infantry Regiment, also known as the Second Chicago Board of Trade Regiment. McClurg was named a captain under Col. Francis Trowbridge Sherman. Within a month, the regiment saw action at the Battle of Perryville.

When the regiment arrived at Nashville, Tennessee, McClurg was named a judge advocate of a general court martial. When Major General Alexander McDowell McCook noticed McClurg's skill in the proceedings, he named McClurg his acting assistant adjutant general. McClurg assisted with planning the Tullahoma Campaign. Following a command reorganization following the Battle of Chickamauga, McClurg was reassigned to the staffs of Philip Sheridan, George Henry Thomas, and Absalom Baird. Baird named McClurg his adjutant general, assisting with the Chattanooga campaign.

On April 14, 1864, he was named adjutant general to John M. Palmer, assisting with the Atlanta campaign. After Palmer resigned his post, Major General Jefferson C. Davis requested the services of McClurg as adjutant general and Chief of Staff of XIV Corps and promoted to lieutenant colonel. With the war winding down, Major General George Stoneman offered McClurg a similar position with the Army of the Tennessee, but McClurg refused. On September 18, 1865, he was breveted brigadier general.

=== Bookselling ===
Although General Davis petitioned McClurg to join the regular army, he instead returned to S. C. Griggs & Co. as a junior partner. The firm became known as Jansen, McClurg & Co. in 1872 after Griggs lost his assets in the Great Chicago Fire the year before. In 1874, McClurg founded the 1st Regiment of the Illinois National Guard, leading it for three years. In 1887, McClurg became senior partner and the company was renamed A. C. McClurg & Co. President Grover Cleveland named McClurg examiner at United States Military Academy. Later that year, he received an honorary Master of the Arts degree from Yale University. The A. C. McClurg & Co. was destroyed in an 1899 fire, but McClurg financed its reconstruction. The new structure, designed by Holabird & Roche, is now recognized as a historic place. At the time of his death, A. C. McClurg & Co. was the largest book and stationery house in the West and was among the largest in the country.

=== Personal life ===
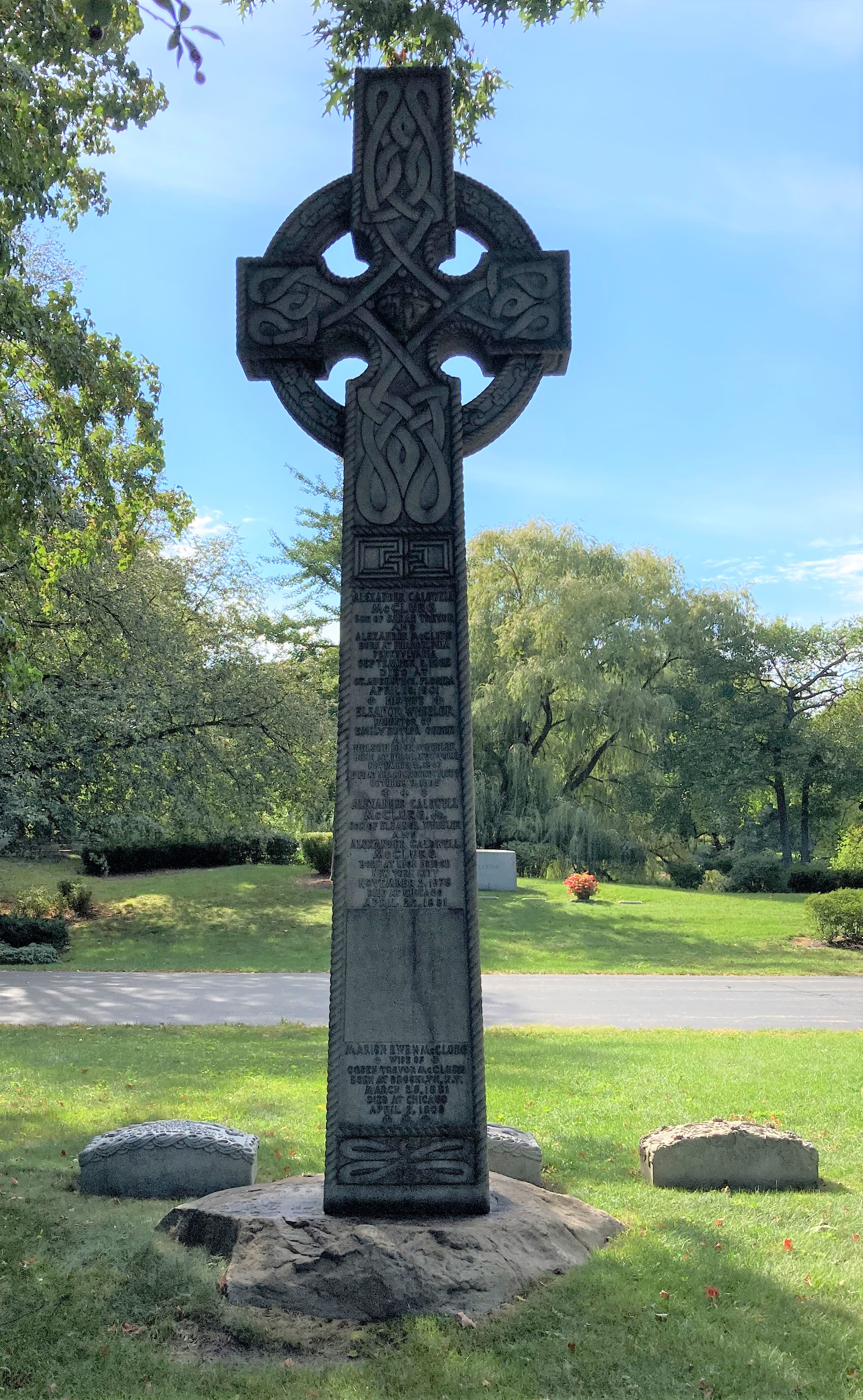
McClurg's grave at Graceland Cemetery

McClurg married Eleanor Wheeler, the niece of first Mayor of Chicago William B. Ogden, in 1877. They had two children, though one died in infancy. McClurg served terms as president of the Chicago Literary Club and the Commercial Club of Chicago. He served as vice president of the Chicago Historical Society and the University Club of Chicago. He was one of the first thirteen trustees of the Newberry Library in Chicago. McClurg co-founded the American Publishers Association and served as its first vice president shortly before his death. He died in Saint Augustine, Florida, on April 15, 1901, and was buried in Graceland Cemetery in Chicago.
