= 29th United States Colored Infantry Regiment =

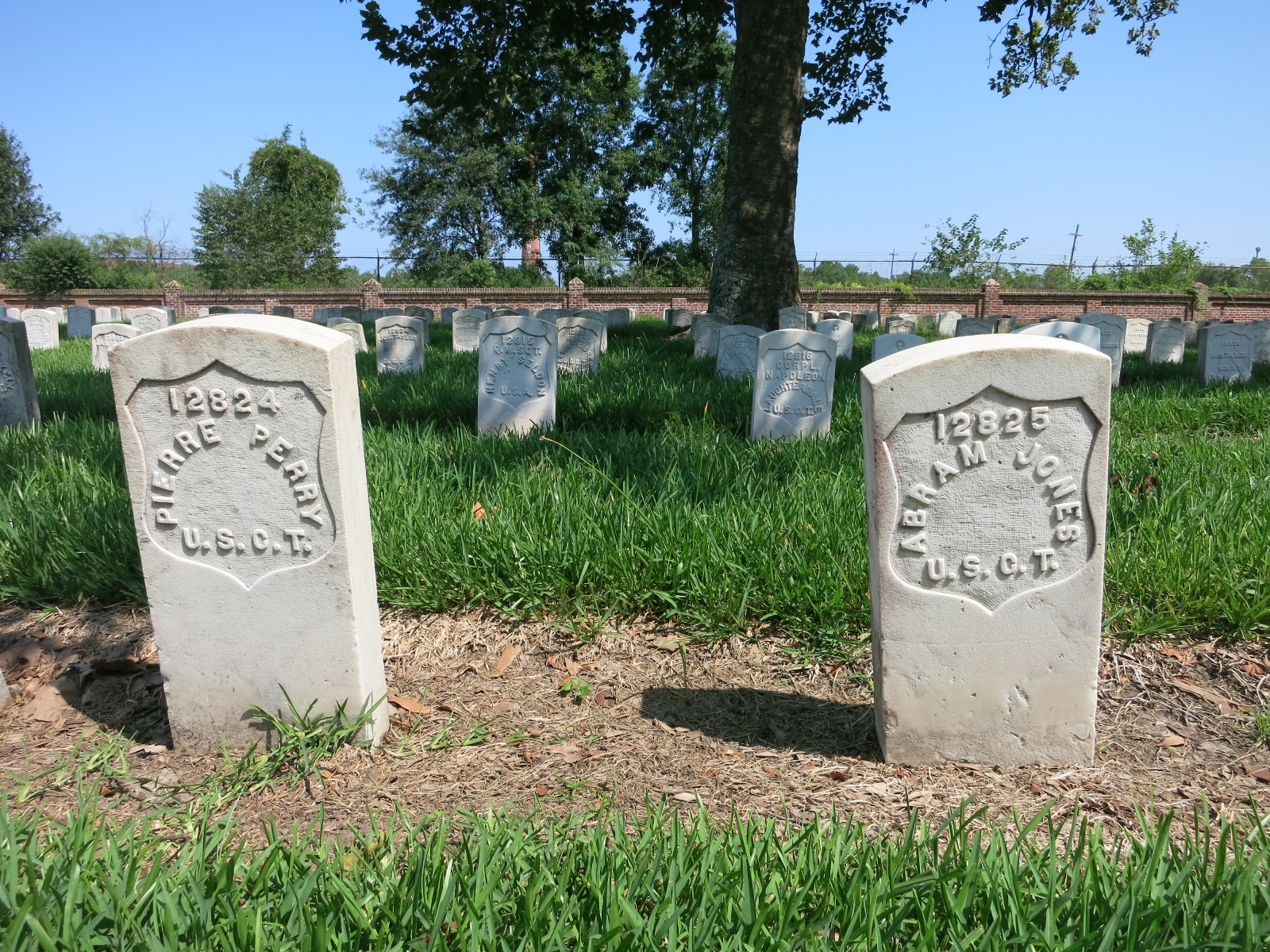
- Graves of U.S. Colored Troops at Chalmette National Cemetery in New Orleans
- Active: 24 April 1864 – 6 November 1865
- Country: United States
- Allegiance: (United States) Union; Illinois
- Branch: Union Army
- Type: Infantry
- Size: Regiment
- Engagements: American Civil War; Siege of Petersburg (1864–65); Battle of the Crater (1864); Battle of Globe Tavern (1864); Battle of Peebles' Farm (1864); Battle of Boydton Plank Road (1864); Appomattox Campaign (1865)

Commanders
- Notable commanders: John A. Bross; Clark E. Royce

The 29th United States Colored Infantry was an infantry regiment of United States Colored Troops from Illinois that served in the Union Army during the American Civil War. The regiment was officially accepted for service in April 1864 and sent to fight in the Eastern Theater of the American Civil War. Assigned to an infantry division where all the rank and file were African-American, the unit guarded the army wagon train and dug trenches for a few weeks. The regiment fought its first major action at the Battle of the Crater in July, where it suffered heavy casualties. It fought in other actions during the Siege of Petersburg and participated in the final Appomattox Campaign in April 1865. The unit transferred to Texas and was probably present in Galveston when Union General Gordon Granger announced emancipation on Juneteenth (19 June 1865). The regiment was mustered out in November 1865.

== Formation ==
After President Abraham Lincoln issued the Emancipation Proclamation on 1 January 1863, he requested that four regiments should be raised from African-Americans. Eventually, 300,000 soldiers in 166 so-called colored regiments were raised during the Civil War. These consisted of one engineer, one field artillery, 145 infantry, 12 heavy artillery, and seven cavalry regiments, of which about 60 took part in field operations. Of the personnel assigned to these regiments, 143 (white) officers and 2,751 (black) enlisted men were killed or died of their wounds. In late 1863, Illinois Governor Richard Yates issued an executive order that prescribed how the regiment would be raised. At first, enlistment was slow because of the low pay for black recruits and because it was expected that captured black soldiers would be badly treated by the Confederates. The War Department set up the Bureau for Colored Troops; this organization determined which white soldiers to commission as officers for the new colored regiments. Non-commissioned officers and privates were African-American. Initially, there was a stigma attached to white officers in the colored regiments, but this was quickly overcome by the prospect of rapid promotion. Soon there was a large number of white applicants for the new positions.

The 29th United States Colored Infantry Regiment (29th USCI) was organized at Quincy, Illinois and mustered into Federal service on 24 April 1864. Lieutenant Colonel John A. Bross of Chicago organized the regiment and became its commanding officer. Bross formerly commanded Company A of the 88th Illinois Infantry Regiment and was a veteran of the Battle of Stones River. His brother was a Chicago Tribune newspaper editor who later became lieutenant governor of Illinois. Because of his political connections, Bross' enemies questioned whether he was a real soldier or a mere political hack. T. Jefferson Brown of Quincy was appointed major on 22 April 1864. Other initial appointments were Sergeant Major William McCaslin, Quartermaster Sergeant Joseph N. Scott, Commissary Sergeant James H. Brown, and Musician Lewis T. Wood. Positions at the regimental level, such as colonel, adjutant, quartermaster, surgeon, and chaplain were not filled until later in 1864 and 1865.

Company F was credited to Wisconsin. Although Wisconsin provided a handful of recruits, most of the soldiers were really from Illinois or Missouri and agreed to take the place of Wisconsin residents. William H. Costley of Pekin was mustered into B Company as a recruit on 21 September 1864. Costley, whose surname is variously spelled in directories, census records, court documents, military records and burial records as Costly, Cosley, Corsley, and Crossley, was the son of Nance Legins-Costley, who was freed from slavery in 1841 by the Supreme Court of Illinois in a case where she was represented by Abraham Lincoln. The company captains and the approximate recruitment areas of the 29th USCI were as follows.

Company Captains and Recruitment Areas of the 29th U.S. Colored Infantry Regiment
Company	Original Captain	Recruitment Area
A	Robert Porter	Quincy
B	Hector H. Aiken	Chicago
C	James W. Brockway	Chicago
D	Abner C. Knapp	Chicago, Quincy, Shawneetown
E	William H. Flint	Wood River and Alton
F	Willard E. Daggett	Milwaukee, Wisconsin
G	William A. Southwell	various
H	Francis E. Newton	various
I	Frederick A. Chapman	various
K	J. Mason Dunn	various

== Service ==
=== Battle of the Crater ===
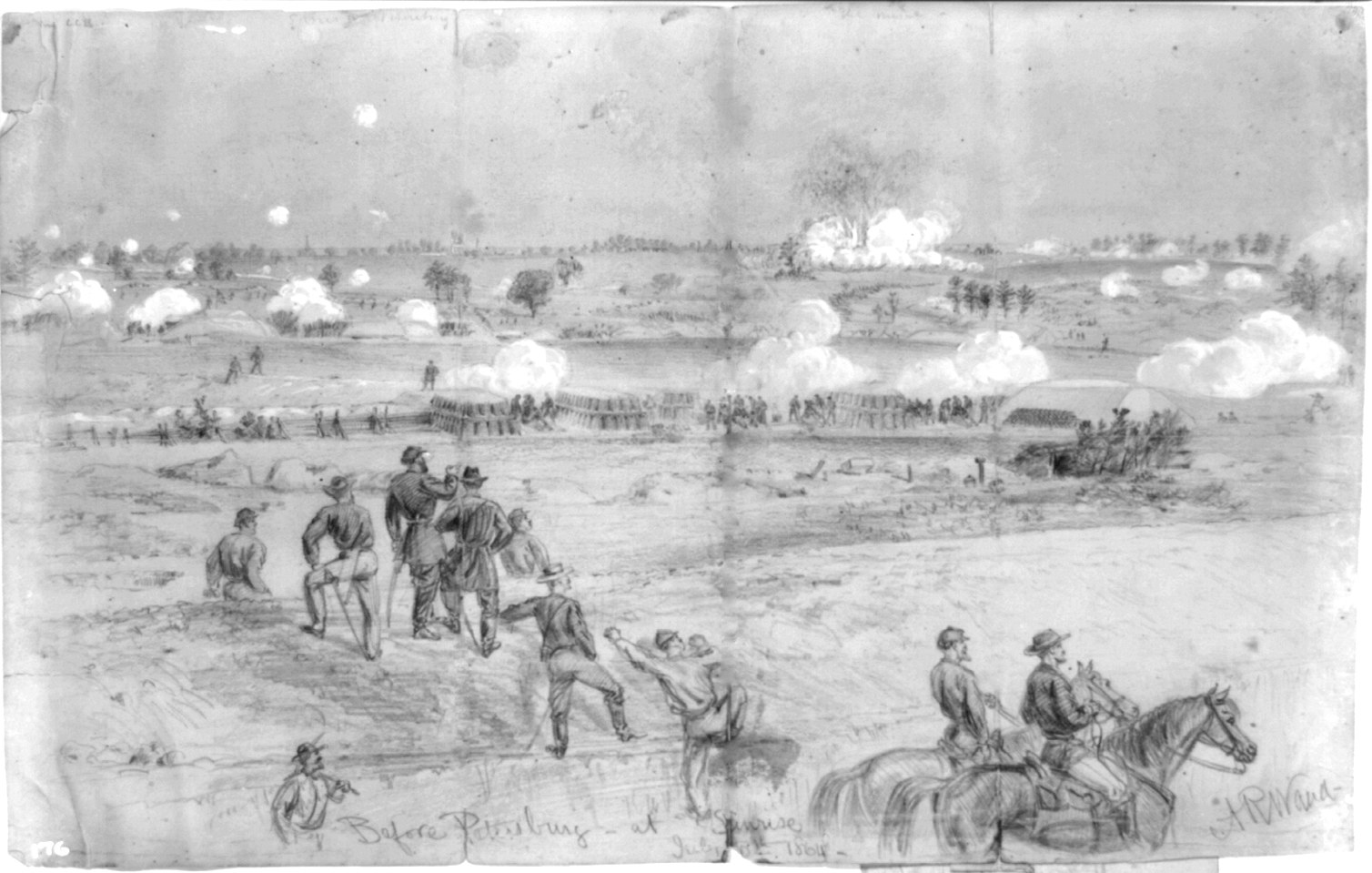
Sketch shows the Battle of the Crater explosion.

The 29th USCI was ordered first to Annapolis, Maryland on 27 May 1864, and then to Alexandria, Virginia, where it was attached to the XXII Corps in the defenses of Washington, D.C. On 15 June 1864 the regiment was shipped to White House, Virginia where it joined the 2nd Brigade, 4th Division, IX Corps, Army of the Potomac. Attitudes in the IX Corps were described as a racially tolerant. The commander of the all-black 4th Division was Brigadier General Edward Ferrero whose earlier career was described by one author as "questionable". Nevertheless, Ferrero had previously led a white infantry division for eight months. In the first three weeks of July 1864, the 4th Division was detached from IX Corps to protect the wagon train of the Army of the Potomac, whose commander Major General George Meade believed that black soldiers were more useful as laborers than as soldiers. On 22 July, the 4th Division rejoined the IX Corps.

At that time, the Siege of Petersburg had resulted in a stalemate. Lieutenant Colonel Henry Pleasants of the 48th Pennsylvania Infantry Regiment, from a coal mining region, proposed a plan to dig a tunnel under the Confederate trenches and use explosives to blast a gap in the defenses. Lieutenant General Ulysses S. Grant reluctantly gave his approval, and in late June 1864 ordered the IX Corps commander, Major General Ambrose Burnside to carry it out. Hard fighting had reduced the white IX Corps divisions to a low state of morale, while the 4th Division was eager to get into the fighting. Therefore, Burnside selected the 4th Division to lead the assault. After the mine exploded, Burnside's plan called for Ferrero's two brigades to pass the crater on the right and left. While the lead regiment of each brigade would secure the trenches on each side, the following regiments would press forward to capture a key ridge 500 yd (457 m) farther forward. Colonel Henry Goddard Thomas commanded the brigade in which the 29th USCI served. Thomas wrote that when the enlisted men heard that they were to lead the attack, they became very quiet at first, but then began singing, "We looks like men marching on, we looks like men of war".

On 26 July, Burnside presented his attack plan to Meade. Believing that black troops were unfit even for picket duty, Meade refused to allow the 4th Division to lead the assault. However, he agreed to refer the question to Grant who was his superior. Meade convinced Grant by pointing out that if the African-American troops led the attack and were massacred, that the public would believe that the Union Army "did not care anything about them". With the planned attack only 12 hours away on 29 July, Grant ordered Burnside to select a white division to lead the attack. Crestfallen, Burnside had his three white division commanders draw lots and Brigadier General James H. Ledlie's division was selected to lead the attack. Burnside intended for Ferrero to give his division special training for the assault, but there is no evidence that this was done. In a letter to The Christian Recorder, Sergeant William McCoslin of the 29th USCI wrote on 26 July that the regiment had been building fortifications for the last eight days.

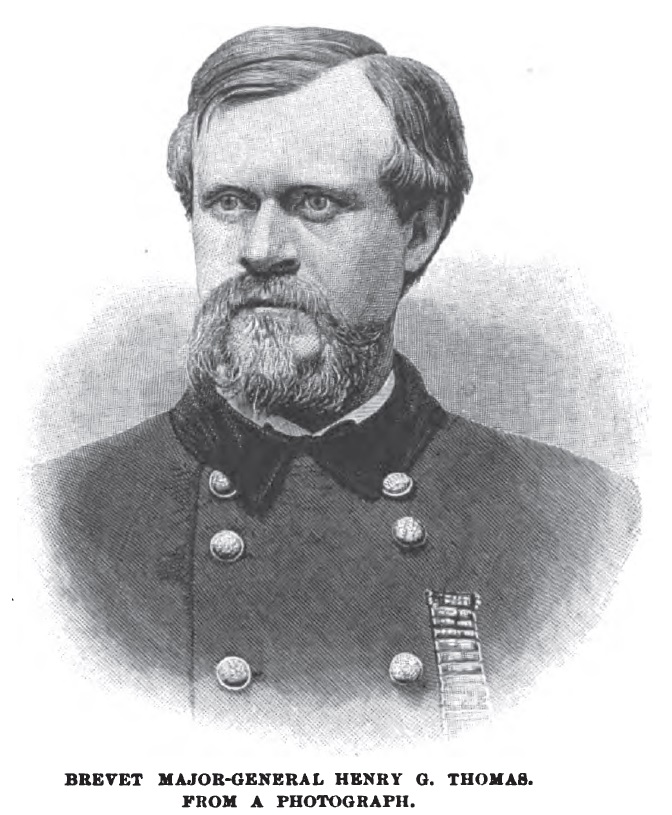
Henry G. Thomas

The Battle of the Crater began at 4:45 am on 30 July 1864 when the mine detonated, creating a hole 200 ft (61 m) long, 50 ft (15 m) wide, and 25 ft (8 m) deep. Ledlie's astonished troops waited for five minutes after the explosion before moving forward, and then most of them took shelter in the crater. Instead of directing his troops, Ledlie stayed well to the rear in an aid station demanding "stimulants" from a surgeon for his malaria. Meanwhile, the two white divisions on either side of Ledlie's were struggling to move forward against the alerted Confederates. Ferrero protested against sending his troops forward and then joined Ledlie in his dugout. Thomas' brigade included 2,400 men of the 19th, 23rd, 28th, 29th, and 31st USCIs. The latter three units each went into battle with only six companies.

At 6:00 am, the soldiers of the 4th Division were ordered into the covered way, where a steady stream of wounded men passed them on their way to the rear. Finally, at 7:30 am, the division moved forward at the double-quick, with Colonel Joshua K. Sigfried's brigade in the lead, followed by Thomas' brigade. Seeing that the crater was filled with soldiers, Thomas directed his troops toward the right into a newly captured section of trench about 800 ft (244 m) from the crater. As the brigade emerged from the captured trench to rush the ridge, it was hit by a deadly crossfire from musketry and from an eight-gun battery on the right. In the first rush, the 31st USCI lost many of its officers and men. Thomas ordered a second charge by the 23rd, 28th, and 29th USCI. Bross led the 29th USCI into battle in full uniform and was fatally wounded while carrying the regimental colors. The lieutenant who picked up the colors was also shot down. In mid-career the second charge was struck by a Confederate brigade from Brigadier General William Mahone's division and overwhelmed. After desperate fighting, the Confederates killed, captured, or routed the remaining Union troops in the crater. Ferrero's division suffered 1,300 casualties in the fiasco.

The Battle of the Crater cost the 29th USCI two officers and 38 enlisted men killed, four officers and 53 enlisted men wounded, and 33 enlisted men captured according to the Official Army Register. Bross and Captain William H. Flint died on 30 July, while Captain Hector H. Aiken died of his wounds on 1 August. Historian Victor Hicken gave the casualties of the 29th USCI as 11 officers killed or wounded, 19 enlisted men killed, 47 wounded, and 47 captured, totaling 124. Burnside was relieved of command two weeks later and Ledlie resigned in January 1865.

=== Subsequent actions ===
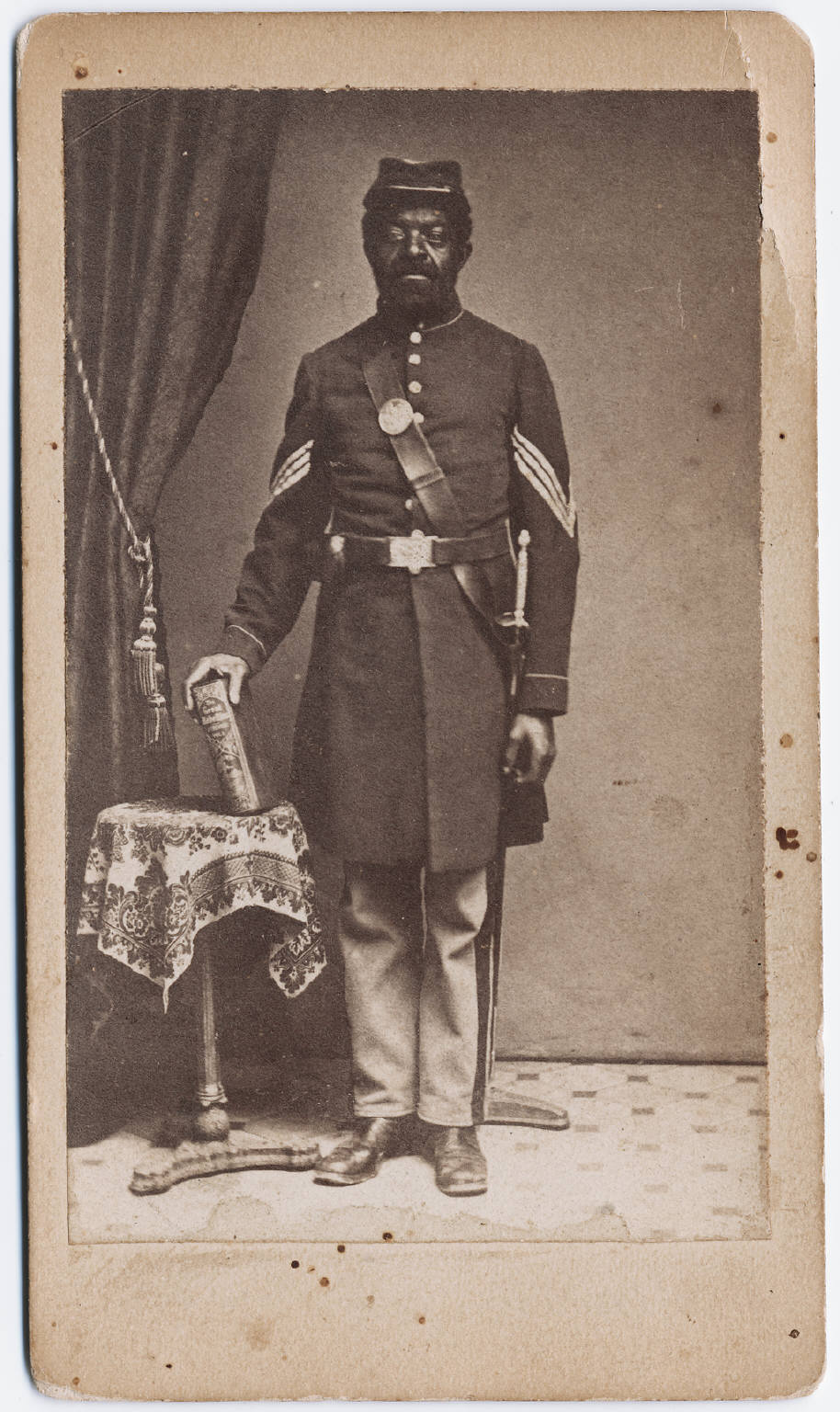
Black sergeant

The 29th USCI was present during the Battle of Weldon Railroad on 18–21 August 1864. From September–December 1864, the 29th USCI served in the 2nd Brigade, 3rd Division, IX Corps. During this period, the regiment saw action at the Battle of Poplar Grove Church on 29–30 September and the Battle of Boydton Plank Road on 27–28 October. The unit transferred to the 3rd Brigade, 2nd Division, XXV Corps in December. The XXV Corps was a new formation that consisted of all the African-American troops involved in the campaign. The 31 December 1864 order of battle showed the 29th USCI under Major Brown serving in Colonel Henry C. Ward's brigade, Brigadier General William Birney's division, and Major General Godfrey Weitzel's corps. The regiment was brigaded with the 28th and 31st USCI.

On 1 January 1865, Clark E. Royce was appointed colonel and Frederick E. Camp was appointed lieutenant colonel of the 29th USCI. The regiment served on the Bermuda Hundred front in Spring 1865. The unit held trenches in the area of Chafin's Farm and Fort Burnham. On 26 March 1865, Birney's division was ordered to cross the James River and march to Hatcher's Run on the left flank. On 1 April, Major General Philip Sheridan crushed a Confederate force in the Battle of Five Forks. The following day at dawn, the regiment participated in an assault that broke through the Confederate defenses. The 29th USCI marched into Petersburg singing John Brown's Body. The regiment participated in the Appomattox Campaign through 9 April 1865. During the campaign, the 29th USCI was led by Colonel Royce and the 3rd Brigade, 2nd Division, XXV Corps was commanded by Colonel William W. Woodward.

The 29th USCI performed garrison duty in Virginia until May 1865. Grant ordered the XXV Corps to be transferred to Texas on 18 May and the troops were at sea by 24 May. The 29th USCI was first shipped from Virginia to Mobile, Alabama before heading to Texas. The subsequent voyage was plagued by storms and some accounts state that the regiment went ashore at Galveston on 18–20 June 1865. This placed the regiment at the same location where General Granger read General Order No. 3 on 19 June, freeing all slaves in Texas. This event is annually celebrated by African-Americans as Juneteenth. The 29th USCI was in garrison on the Rio Grande from June until it mustered out on 6 November 1865.

A search of the National Park Service roster of the 29th USCI shows 2,072 soldiers. According to Frederick H. Dyer, three officers and 43 enlisted men of the 29th USCI were killed in action or mortally wounded, and 188 enlisted men died from disease, for 234 total deaths. Hicken stated that 49 men deserted and that there were 158 deaths from battle and disease, not counting the many who died in Confederate prisons.

== See also ==
- List of United States Colored Troops Civil War units
