= McClurg Building =

McClurg Building may refer to:

- McClurg Building (Chicago), in Illinois, listed on the National Register of Historic Places in Cook County, Illinois
- McClurg Building (Racine, Wisconsin), listed on the National Register of Historic Places in Racine County, Wisconsin
