= A. C. McClurg =

A. C. McClurg & Co.
- Status: Active
- Founded: 1844 (predecessor business)
- Founder: Alexander C. McClurg
- Country of origin: United States
- Headquarters location: Chicago, Illinois
- Publication types: Books and literary periodicals
- Official website: https://www.acmcclurg.com

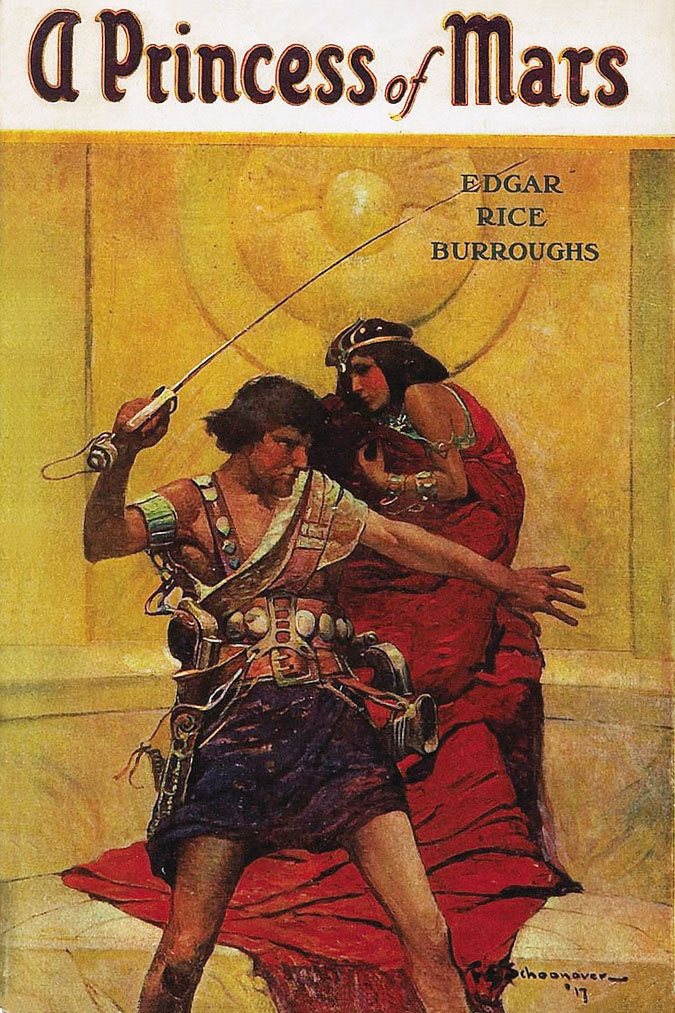
A Princess of Mars by Edgar Rice Burroughs, McClurg, 1917

A. C. McClurg was a stationer, publisher, and book wholesaler for over 120 years in Chicago, Illinois. The business began in 1844 as Chicago's first stationery store and first retail bookstore. It changed hands several times, often as the result of a fire. Alexander McClurg came into management of the business at the time of the Great Chicago Fire (1871) and established an interest in fine literature, which was pursued by the company until late in the first decade of the 20th century. While pursuing interests in fine English literature and the literary magazine, The Dial, perhaps one of the most historically important books published by McClurg's "rare books" section was W. E. B. Du Bois' The Souls of Black Folk (1903).

About a decade after McClurg's death, the company shut down his rare books section of the business and pursued popular adventure. It was the original publisher of the Tarzan of the Apes novels and other stories by Chicago author Edgar Rice Burroughs, as well as the Tom Mix stories. While these books proved successful, the business model eventually changed again, and from 1922 to 1962, A.C. McClurg was primarily a book wholesaler. The company later became known for its publishing activities, reopening in 2008 as a hybrid publisher.

== History ==
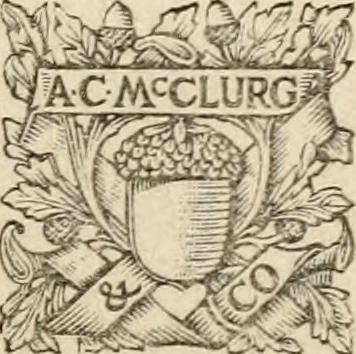
Logo used in 1910

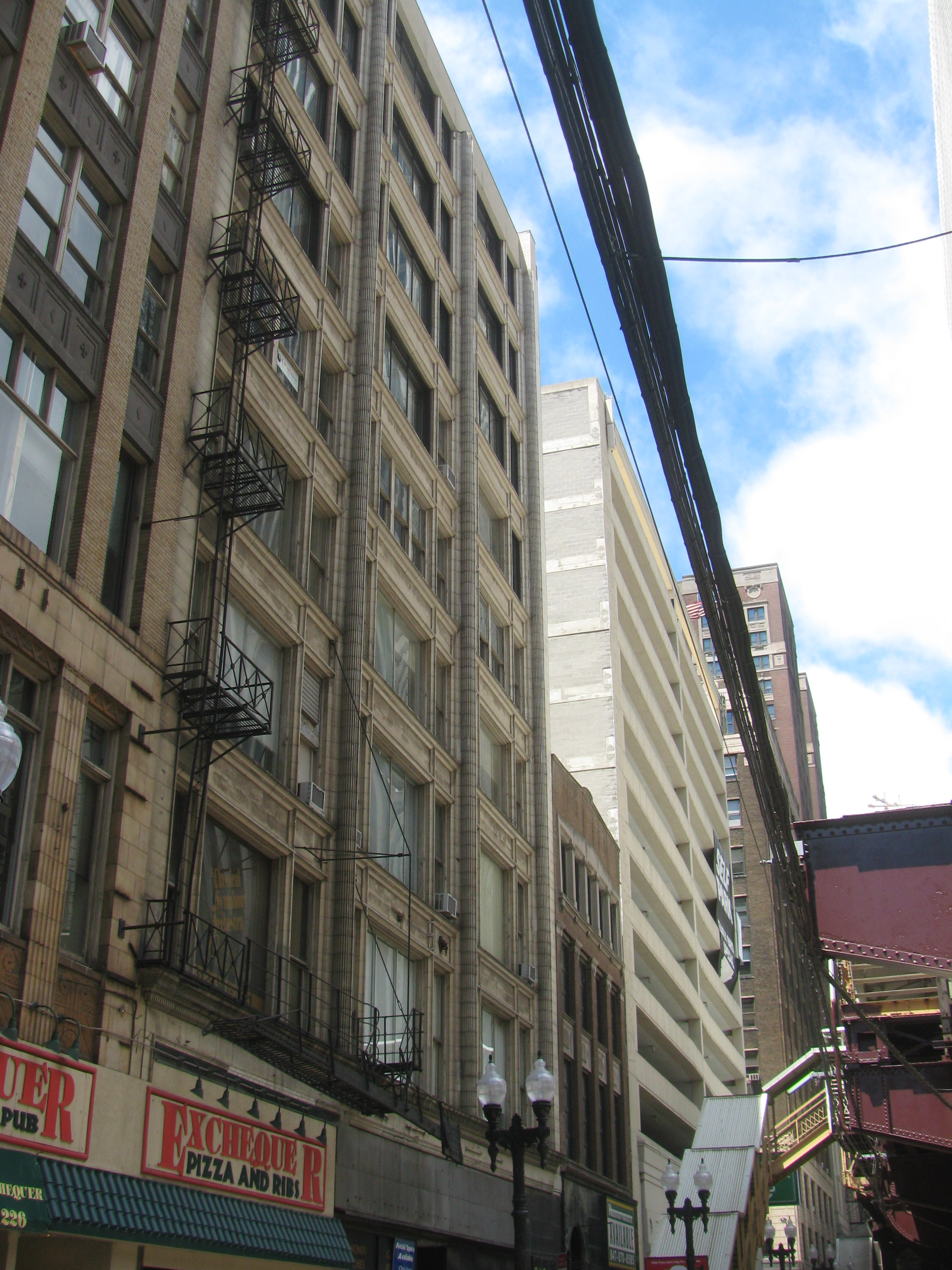
The McClurg Building in Chicago, Illinois, company headquarters after 1899. Designed by Holabird & Roche, it is now listed on the National Register of Historic Places.

The company was founded in Chicago, Illinois, in 1844 as W. W. Barlow & Co., which soon changed names to S. C. Griggs & Co. It was briefly known as Griggs, Bross & Co. after William Bross was admitted as a partner in 1848; the partnership dissolved after eighteen months. Alexander C. McClurg, a former law student who moved to Chicago to join the mercantile trade, joined the company in 1859. McClurg joined Griggs as a junior partner after he returned a general from the Civil War. The company building was burned down in the Great Chicago Fire of 1871. After the fire, Griggs sold his share of the company and it became Jansen, McClurg & Co. McClurg became senior partner in 1887 and the company took the name of A. C. McClurg & Co. (Note: Probably the company was renamed in 1886. It is identified as "Messrs. A. C. McClurg & Co. (Successors to Jansen, McClurg & Co.), Chicago." at the head of its list of new books received during September: "Books of the Month", The Dial VII:78 (October 1886), pp. 137-39.) The company was again destroyed in a fire in 1899, but McClurg financed a new building. McClurg died in 1901, but the company retained his name in subsequent decades.

A. C. McClurg revitalized The Dial magazine in 1880 as a platform of politics and literary criticism. Under Francis Fisher Browne, the magazine gained national prominence, but it was sold three years after Browne's death in 1913. In 1913, A. C. McClurg published its first Edgar Rice Burroughs Tarzan of the Apes book. McClurg would publish the first ten novels of the series. By 1923, the company's operations focused exclusively on wholesaling. The company remained in business until 1967.
