= William W. Thomas Jr. =

American politician (1839–1927)

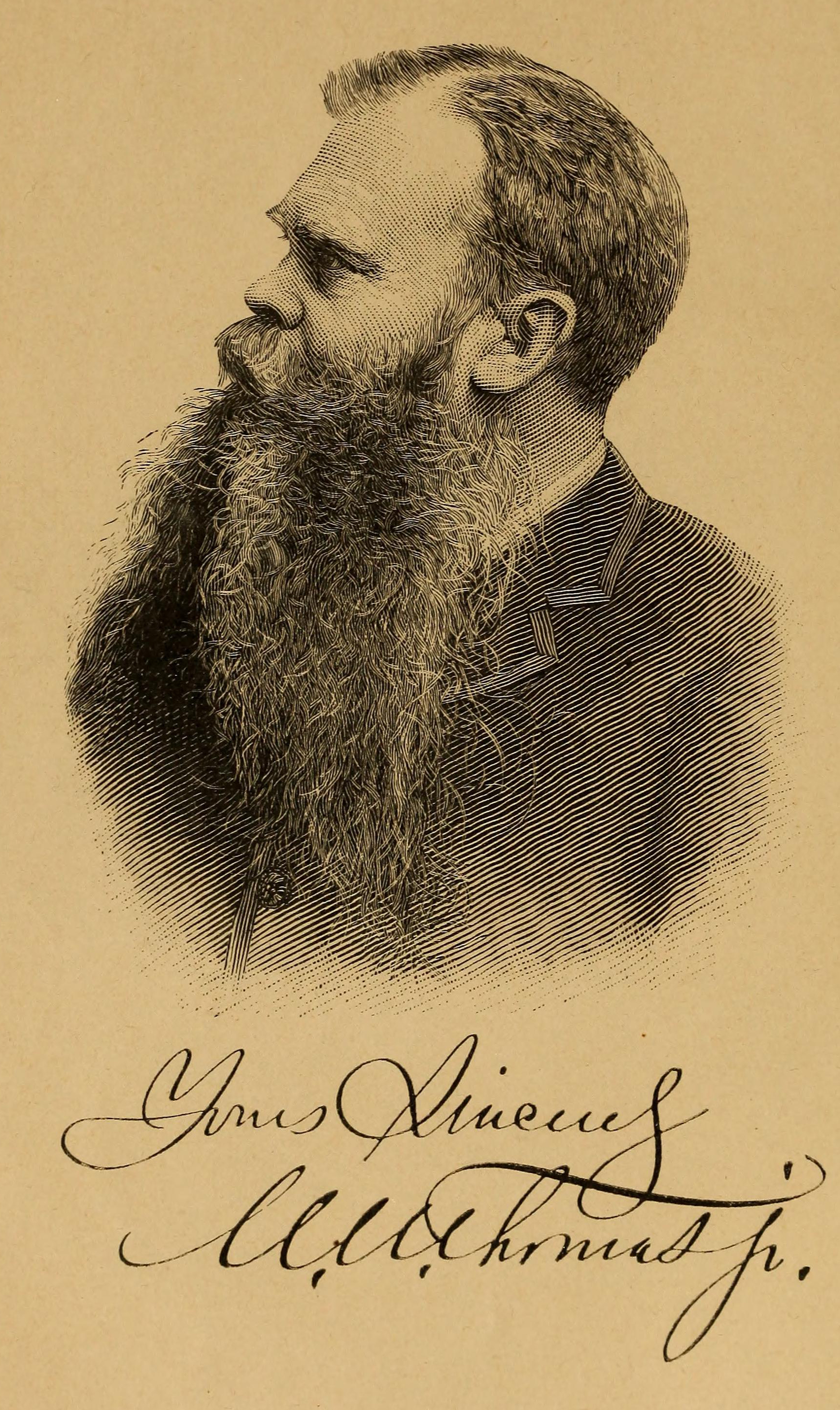

American Minister to Sweden
- In office June 6, 1883 – June 30, 1885
- President: Chester A. Arthur
- Preceded by: John L. Stevens
- Succeeded by: Rufus Magee
- In office March 19, 1889 – May 2, 1894
- President: Benjamin Harrison; Grover Cleveland
- Preceded by: Rufus Magee
- Succeeded by: Thomas B. Ferguson
- In office December 18, 1898 – May 31, 1905
- President: William McKinley; Theodore Roosevelt
- Preceded by: Thomas B. Ferguson
- Succeeded by: Charles H. Graves

speaker of the Maine House of Representatives
- In office 1875–1876
- Governor: Nelson Dingley Jr.
- Preceded by: Edmund F. Webb
- Succeeded by: Frederick Robie

Personal details
- Born: William Widgery Thomas Jr. August 26, 1839 Portland, Maine, U.S.
- Died: April 25, 1927 (aged 87) Portland, Maine, U.S.
- Resting place: Evergreen Cemetery
- Party: Republican
- Relations: Henry Goddard Thomas (Brother)

William Widgery Thomas Jr. (August 26, 1839 – April 25, 1927) was an American politician from Maine.

== Background ==
He was born in Portland, Cumberland County, Maine, the son of William Widgery Thomas and Elizabeth White (Goddard) Thomas. A lawyer before entering foreign politics, most notable was his effort to bring Swedish colonists to northern Maine and later founding the community of New Sweden, Maine in 1870. He is also noted for being the last U.S. ambassador to the united kingdoms of Sweden and Norway.

== Consular years ==
A Republican, Thomas found a love for the people of Scandinavia at an early age. At only 23 years of age, and full of enthusiasm for his task, he was appointed consul to Gothenburg, Sweden on October 23, 1862. Prior to that he had gone as American consul to Galatz in Romania, and after a voyage of four months, he reached Gothenburg in the middle of June 1863. He learned quickly to understand and speak Swedish, and as consul, in the kingdom of Sweden-Norway he laid plans for a large emigration of both Swedes and Norwegians, with the hopes that most would seek new fortunes in his home state of Maine. As he wrote April 5, 1864, for the encouragement of immigration: "Besides all other reasons, I believe these honest, pious, plodding Swedes would form an excellent balance to the fickle, merry, light-hearted Irish, who are now crowding in such goodly numbers to our shores."

After the Second war of Schleswig between Denmark and Prussia ended in 1864, Swedish volunteers coming back from Denmark wanted to go to America and continue fighting there in the American Civil War. Thomas solved this problem without asking his government for directions. He arranged with the captains of the Hamburg steamers to take these soldiers across the ocean at half price, and together with some friends he "made up a little purse" with which they could be sent to Hamburg. "I am well aware," he reported to the U.S. Department of State, "that as consul I can have nothing to do with enlisting soldiers, but no international law can prevent me from paying a soldier's passage from here to Hamburg out of my own pocket." In the course of the following winter, Thomas induced more Swedish soldiers to go to America.

The same year he had planned to enlarge his propaganda for emigration considerably. He wrote to the Department: "I have the honor to ask for a leave of absence from this Consular district, but not from this Kingdom, for three months; my absence to commence about the middle of May next. My design is to visit the mines in the interior of Sweden and Norway and to see and talk with the people of this country in their own homes. One of the chief objects of my expedition will be to encourage all whom I meet to emigrate to the United States. In every hamlet where I pass the night, at every post-station where I await fresh horses, I shall scatter such information as I have found by experience to be best calculated to promote the emigration of these Scandinavians to our own land. It is my intention on my return to report the results of my expedition to the Department, giving special attention to the subject of immigration, stating what impediments still exist, and the best means of overcoming them. Hon. J. S. Haldeman, Minister Resident at Stockholm, has authorized me to mention that he warmly approves of my intended journey."

The department, too, approved. It granted, on March 26, the leave of absence Thomas had applied for. But when this permission arrived, he was so busy arranging his other plans that he decided to postpone his trip until the next year. Towards the end of June 1865, he set out on the journey he had planned, taking with him the text of the Homestead Act and other documents printed in the language of the country, proposing to sow this good seed broadcast all along his way. In fact, the journey came to embrace Norway almost exclusively. Returning to Gothenburg after several months, he sent his report to the Department of State, an excerpt of it reads:

One of the chief objects of my expedition was to diffuse knowledge tending towards emigration, and whether driving over the fjelds, scaling mountains, resting at stations, or coasting along the shore in steamers, I everywhere preached an immigration crusade to the laborer's paradise in the New World. I spoke of our homestead law — the fertility of our soil — the length of our summer — the richness of our immense mining districts, but I found nothing so telling as the simple description of the condition and prospects of the working man in the United States of America. Of fifty odd postillions I had along the road, all promised me to immigrate to the United States next Spring, save one; he, I ascertained, had been in England for nine months, and, judging all foreign countries by the one he had visited, concluded, perhaps wisely according to his light, to remain at home. ( ... ) Sometimes some Norwegian proprietors, not liking perhaps the tendency of things, would commence a discussion in presence of the deck-passengers. I found it very easy to refute all their arguments. When driven from every other point they invariably took refuge under the palladium of patriotism — love for Gamle Norge (Old Norway). To this I replied, that I recognized no love of country, not connected with love for our countrymen; if then, as they had been constrained to admit, the Norwegian laborer bettered his condition by immigrating into the United States, true patriotism should assist him to go, not hinder him from going. I however always treated these Norwegian gentlemen personally with the greatest respect. In no case did one discussion descend to altercation, and no unfriendly words were ever used.

Thomas estimated a total of 10,000 immigrants that year to the United States from Sweden and Norway, but he was quick to add the numbers would prove rather under than over the truth.

Shortly after this propaganda trip through Norway, the consular activities of Thomas came to an end. At the beginning of November 1865, he received notice from the Department of State that, under the act of Congress, it was not authorized to continue his salary anymore. Consequently, he resigned and left for his home state of Maine.

== Maine politics ==
In Maine, he became, in 1870, a member of the immigration commission, virtually its leading member, and in that year he went to Sweden, brought a whole colony of Swedes back to America, and founded New Sweden in the northern forests of Maine, where he himself spent the better part of the next four years. He was a member of the Maine House of Representatives 1873–1875 and served as Speaker of the Maine House of Representatives from 1874 to 1875. He was also a member of the Maine State Senate in 1879 and delegate to the Republican National Convention from Maine in 1880.

== Ambassador years ==
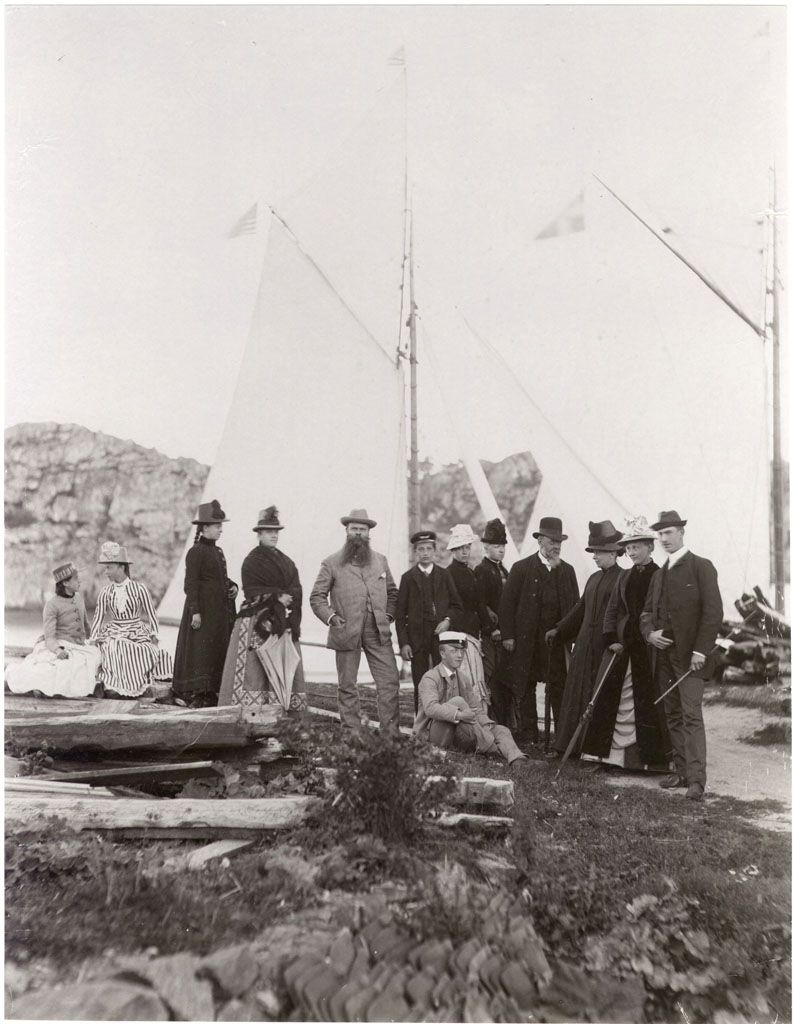
The American ambassador William W. Thomas Jr (bearded man) visiting the Curman family in Lysekil.

Thomas would return to Scandinavia, serving as American Minister to Sweden and Norway in three separate terms: 1883–1885, 1889–1894 and 1898–1905. Sweden in particular would always remain his great love; he married a Swedish noblewoman, Dagmar Törnebladh (1869–1912), on October 11, 1887, in Stockholm. While in Sweden he was also a member of the men's association Sällskapet Idun.

Thomas was appointed American Minister for his third and last period on December 18, 1898, until he was recalled on May 31, 1905. In a letter to the U.S. Department of State February 2, 1905, Thomas wrote: "A serious crisis for the union of Sweden and Norway seems very imminent." He was commenting on the growing concerns that the Norwegian government was about to renounce the union with Sweden. He added in the letter that he was convinced there would not be a war between the two countries, and personally he hoped the union could be preserved. He continued, "in this conviction of peace, lies the greatest hope for every friend of Scandinavia, that the union between these two noble nations in the high north, must be preserved in one form or another." In March 1905 he reported home that the Norwegian government had resigned and a new one would be formed. He noted the new one would probably be composed of "members of the extreme left, meaning those who wish for an immediate and radical action in regard to the relationship between Sweden and Norway." This "extreme left" was now prime minister Christian Michelsen, who to all Norwegians would become the leading symbol of the movement towards dissolution of the unpopular union. Thomas' last mission as American Minister ended that spring; he was recalled on May 31, making him in effect the last US ambassador to the united kingdoms of Sweden and Norway. On June 7, 1905, the union of Sweden and Norway ended, and he would be succeeded by Charles H. Graves.

== Later life ==
Thomas moved back home to Maine. He married a second time on June 2, 1915, in Solna, Sweden, his first wife's younger sister, Aina Törnebladh (1877–1967). On June 2, 1919, Thomas donated the Thomas Memorial Library to the Inhabitants of the Town of Cape Elizabeth to be maintained as a free public library forever. Ambassador Thomas died in Portland on April 25, 1927, and was buried there at Evergreen Cemetery.

His wives were the daughters of Dr Henrik Ragnar Törnebladh (1833–1912), a headmaster and member of the Swedish Parliament 1873–1875, 1879–1888 and 1889–1909, and his wife Elisabeth Maria Siljeström (1842–1929).

Thomas was honoured with the Royal Swedish Order of the Polar Star, Knight Commander 1st class, in 1887, and Grand Cross in 1905.

== Personal ==
William W. Thomas Jr. is the younger brother of Civil War General Henry Goddard Thomas, they are even buried at the same cemetery; Evergreen Cemetery

== Other sources ==
- Hede, Richard, Centennial History of Maine's Swedish colony (Stockholm, Me.: 1970)
- Malmquist, Marie, Lapptäcke (New Sweden, Me.: 1928–1929)
- Melvin, Charlotte Lenentine, The Swedish People in Northern Maine (typescript, 1950)
- Melvin, Charlotte Lenentine, et al., The New Sweden Centennial (Chicago, Ill. : Swedish Pioneer Historical Society, 1970)

Preceded by John L. Stevens	U.S. Ambassador to Sweden; 1883–1885	Succeeded by Rufus Magee
Preceded by Rufus Magee	U.S. Ambassador to Sweden; 1889–1894	Succeeded by Thomas B. Ferguson
Preceded by Thomas B. Ferguson	U.S. Ambassador to Sweden; 1898–1905	Succeeded by Charles H. Graves
