= Thomas B. Ferguson =

American diplomat (1841–1922)

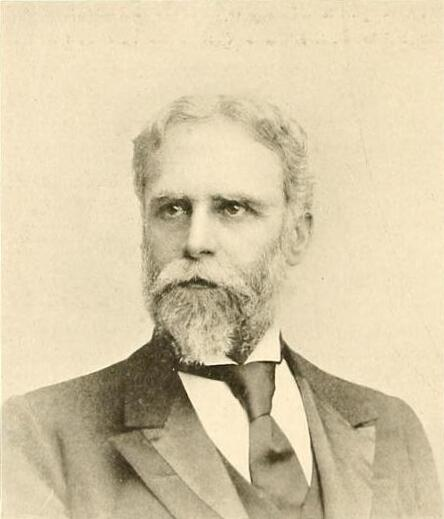
- Ferguson in a 1903 publication

United States Ambassador to Sweden
- In office 1894–1898
- President: Grover Cleveland, William McKinley
- Preceded by: William W. Thomas Jr.
- Succeeded by: William W. Thomas Jr.

Personal details
- Born: Thomas Barker Ferguson; August 8, 1841 near Charleston, South Carolina, U.S.
- Died: August 11, 1922 (aged 81) Boston, Massachusetts, U.S.
- Resting place: Baltimore, Maryland, U.S.
- Spouse: Jean Byrd Swann (m. 1867; died 1893)
- Children: 4
- Education: The Citadel

Military service
- Branch/service: Confederate States Army
- Years of service: 1861–1865
- Rank: Major
- Battles/wars: American Civil War; Battle of Fort Sumter

Thomas Barker Ferguson (August 8, 1841 – August 11, 1922) was an American diplomat from South Carolina. He served as United States Ambassador to Sweden from 1894 to 1898.

== Early life ==
Thomas Barker Ferguson was born on August 8, 1841, at his father's estate near Charleston, South Carolina, to James Ferguson. His grandfather was Thomas Ferguson, a member of the General Assembly of South Carolina.

== Military career ==
Ferguson was a cadet with the South Carolina Military Academy (The Citadel), graduating in 1861. He was a member of the gun battery on Morris Island that fired on the Star of the West during the Battle of Fort Sumter. He served with the Confederate States Army as an engineer and directed the construction of batteries at Fort Sumter. At the age of 25, he was promoted to major and commanded an artillery unit in South Carolina and was present at five battles. He was shot in the lung on July 14, 1863, in Jackson, Mississippi. He commanded the first military district of the Department of South Carolina, Georgia and Florida. The headquarters was in Georgetown, South Carolina, and following the evacuation of Georgetown, he joined General Joseph E. Johnston's army in North Carolina. He was then captured and was a prisoner of war from December 16, 1864, to the war's end.

== Career ==
In 1867, Ferguson moved to Baltimore, Maryland. He was appointed Maryland Fish Commissioner. He was invited to work on experiments related to fish with the Smithsonian Institution and the United States Commission of Fish and Fisheries by Spencer F. Baird. In 1876, he was an expert judge at the Centennial Exposition. He was appointed by the president as assistant commissioner to the 1878 Paris Expedition. After returning to the states, he became the assistant commissioner of fish and fisheries for the United States. He held that role until the death of Baird in 1887.

Ferguson was appointed by President Grover Cleveland as United States Ambassador to Sweden on February 14, 1894. He was presented his credentials on May 2, 1894, and served in the role until February 7, 1898.

Ferguson was a member of Union Club, Metropolitan Club, and the New York Yacht Club.

== Personal life ==
Ferguson married Jean Byrd Swann, daughter of Maryland governor Thomas Swann, in 1867. They had three sons and a daughter, John S., J. DuBose, Samuel and Elizabeth G. His wife died in 1893. In 1879, Ferguson moved with his family to Washington, D.C. He built a house on Highland Terrace on Massachusetts Avenue. The house was sold to the East German government and served as its embassy.

Ferguson died on August 11, 1922, at the home of his son-in-law in Boston. He was buried in Baltimore.
