= Nance Legins-Costley =

African-American freed slave

Nance Legins-Costley (c. 1813–1892), born Nance Legins Cox, an African American, was the first slave legally manumitted (freed) by attorney Abraham Lincoln, in 1841, twenty years before the start of the American Civil War.

== Early life ==
Nance Legins Cox was born in 1813 in Kaskaskia into the household of Colonel Thomas Cox, which at that time was hosting the Illinois Territorial General Assembly. Ironically, Nance was born a slave in the capital of a supposed free territory. Not much is known about her parents except that they were also slaves of Cox. She also had a youngster sister whose name was Dice.

In the period before the trial, Nance would go from being owned by Cox to a man named Nathan Cromwell, from whom she would later fight to gain her freedom.

== Legal battle ==
Nance was an African-American female slave who managed to have her case appealed to the Illinois Supreme Court three times before Lincoln successfully argued for her freedom, using the same Jeffersonian principle Lincoln later signed into law "...that Neither slavery nor involuntary servitude shall exist..." in the state of Illinois and later in the entire United States and its territories. Nance Legins (Cox – Cromwell) Costley became the legal personification of the basic definition of slavery over a period of thirteen years.

In her previous court attempts to gain "My personal liberty" in Nance v. Howard, 1828, the verdict read, "A servant is a possession and CAN BE SOLD". The verdict was challenged in appeal by abolitionist Maj. David Bailey in Bailey v. Cromwell,1841. Bailey's wife, Sarah Brown-Bailey, had family connections to the Underground Railroad, but Nance was with child and in no condition to travel. Major Bailey was a fellow Whig politically, who had served in the same militia unit with a young Captain Lincoln during the Black Hawk War. Abraham Lincoln argued Article VI of the Northwest Ordinance of 1787, no less than three times in court. The decision was written by Illinois Supreme Court Justice and future U.S. Senator Sidney Breese, and established two basic and sweeping precedents that reversed Nance's previous case and other slavery verdicts:

- 3rd. It is a presumption of law, in the State of Illinois, that every person is free, without regard to color. [And therefore]
*4th. The sale of a free person is illegal.

The appeal process was one of the longest in mid-19th century courts, lasting five years, from 1836 to 1841. During that time, Nance Legins Cromwell had married a free Black, Benjamin Costley, on 15 Oct. 1840, just after Lincoln agreed to take the case. The emancipation of Nance by the court took place on July 23, 1841; by that time Nance had three children, Amanda, Elisa Jane, and William, who were forever freed from indentured servitude. Nance and her children became the first four of what eventually became four million slaves freed by the 13th Amendment to the U.S. Constitution.

== Free life ==
Nance had eight children. In 1863 Nance watched her first-born son William H. Costley march off to the Civil War with the First Regiment Illinois Colored Volunteers (29th United States Colored Infantry Regiment). William was wounded in the Siege of Petersburg and became a disabled American Veteran, but not before his regiment was present at the original Juneteenth, celebrating the emancipation of Texas slaves, June 19, 1865, as one of the original Buffalo Soldiers. Nance's second son Leander Costley became one of the original Pullman Porters by 1866. Her husband Ben died in Peoria, Illinois, in 1883, after which Legins-Costley lived with her daughter Amanda and son-in-law Edward Lewis. Legins-Costley died in Peoria, Illinois, on 6 April 1892 at the age of about 79. She was buried in Moffatt Cemetery, a defunct Peoria burial ground formerly near the intersection of South Adams and Griswold streets.

== Biography ==
Nance Legins Costley and the trials that eventually freed her are the subject of Carl Adams's book Nance: Trials of the First Slave Freed by Abraham Lincoln: A True Story of Mrs. Nance Legins-Costley. Her life is more extensively covered in The Girl in the Salt Shed; The unbreakable woman behind Lincoln's first appeal by Carl Adams and Wayne Soini.
