= John A. Bross =

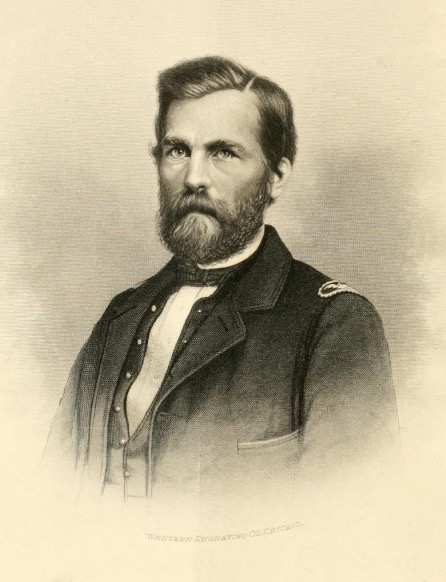
- Born: February 21, 1826; Milford, Pennsylvania
- Died: July 30, 1864 (aged 38); Petersburg, Virginia
- Spouse: Isabella (Belle) Mason
- Children: Cora Bross; Mason Bross
- Military career
- Allegiance: United States of America; Union
- Branch: United States Army; Union Army
- Service years: 1862-1864
- Rank: Colonel
- Units: 88th Illinois Infantry; 29th Colored Infantry
- Conflicts: Battle of Perryville; Battle of Stones River; Battle of Chickamauga; Battle of the Crater
- Memorials: Rosehill Cemetery cenotaph

John Armstrong Bross (February 21, 1826 – July 30, 1864) was a Colonel in the Union Army during the United States Civil War who died while leading the 29th Colored Infantry, part of the 88th Illinois Infantry, against Confederate troops. This occurred during the Battle of the Crater at the siege of Petersburg in Virginia. As he departed to fight in his final battle, Bross said: “If it is the will of Providence that I do not return, I ask no nobler epitaph than that I fell for my country at the head of this black and blue regiment.” (Blue, as in, for the Union army).

== Early life and career ==
Son of Deacon Moses Bross and Jane (Winfield) Bross, John Bross was born in 1826 in Milford, Pike County, Pennsylvania as the seventh child of twelve children—all but one of whom survived into adulthood. He grew up in the Delaware River Valley where New York, New Jersey and Pennsylvania come together where he developed a fondness for poetry and singing. He studied law in Goshen, New York. In 1848 his brother William Bross, persuaded him to join him in Chicago, which had just opened the Illinois Michigan Canal and the first Chicago railroad, to open a law practice together. He became involved in Chicago’s commercial development and political activity, much due to the fact that William Bross, who was 13 years older, became one of the two principal owners of the Chicago Tribune and a political leader. John’s law practice grew and he was very involved with the Third Presbyterian Church, which in 1858 completed a large church at Washington and Carpenter streets. In 1856 he married Isabella Mason who had moved to Chicago from Sterling, Illinois. During the Presidential campaign of 1860, John served as one of the Chief Marshals of the Chicago Lincoln Wide-Awakes, young pro-Republican men from the North and Midwest who dressed in black capes and hats and marched in support of Abraham Lincoln’s campaign.

=== American Civil War ===
Enlisting in the War on August 22, 1862, John Bross raised two companies for the 88th Illinois Regiment and enlisted as captain in one of them. On September 8, 1862, the Chicago Tribune reported a ceremony at the Third Presbyterian Church where the Sunday school students presented a sword to John. The 88th Illinois was sent to Kentucky in September 1862 to join the Army of the Cumberland under General Don Carlos Buell. They had gathered in Louisville to head off a threatened attack by a Confederate army under General Braxton Bragg. John’s first combat was the Battle of Perryville, 70 miles southeast of Louisville. The Confederates retreated into Tennessee although the results of the battle were not totally clear. General William Rosecrans took command of the Union army in Nashville later in the autumn of 1862 and John Bross fought in his second battle at Murfreesboro, sometimes called the Battle of Stones River. It was a confused battle with many deaths on each side, but Bragg’s army withdrew so it was considered a Union victory. In the first part of 1863, Rosecrans built up his battered army and then in the summer of 1863, John moved with it to Chattanooga, an important commercial and railroad hub for the Confederacy. There, on September 19, Rosecrans suffered a major defeat in John’s third battle, the Battle of Chickamauga, just over the Georgia border and south of Chattanooga. Letters that John wrote home to Belle described the hardship of war but also what life was like when they were not in battle, but were marching, or waiting or feeling the effects of hunger and bad weather. In October 1863, soon after the Battle of Chickamauga, the Illinois Governor named then Lieutenant Colonel John A. Bross to raise a regiment of African American soldiers in the state. His recruiting headquarters was in Quincy, Illinois, on the border with Missouri which was a favorite crossing place of escaped slaves. In April 1864 John’s regiment, the 29th U.S. Colored Infantry Regiment, was ordered to Washington to join the army of General Ulysses S. Grant who needed troops for his planned Virginia campaign.

John‘s army first trained for a month in Washington, D.C. during May 1864, before joining Grant’s army as it moved south to Petersburg, the supply town for Richmond, Virginia. His regiment was assigned to the Fourth Division of General Ambrose Burnside’s corps which consisted of nine African American regiments.

The siege of Petersburg was the first modern example of trench warfare, and was used 50 years later in World War I. The explosion in the 510-foot tunnel, some 20 feet down and not detected by the Confederates, was set to go off on Saturday, July 30 at 3:15 in the morning to be followed by the colored troops going through the breach, fanning out to the sides and then charging up to a hill beyond. The following soldiers would then invade the town. But before the explosion, General George Meade announced that he would not use the colored troops to lead the attack, causing much last-minute confusion. The explosion went off at 4:45 am, an hour late. Finally, at 7:30 a.m. as the battle stalled, the colored troops were ordered to go in. At 8:45, John Bross, in full-dress uniform, grabbed the colors of his regiment, climbed on the parapet, and said, “The man who saves these colors shall be promoted”. He was shot just afterwards, and neither flag nor its bearer were ever returned from the battlefield. Of the 400 men who followed Bross into battle, only 128 came back. Afterwards, General Grant said that these black troops should have been allowed to lead the charge. After John’s death there were many tributes to him at a special meeting of the Chicago Bar Association. When veterans from the 29th Colored Regiment formed a chapter of the Grand Army of the Republic in Springfield, Illinois in 1886, they named it the John Bross Post in honor of their fallen colonel.

== Personal life ==
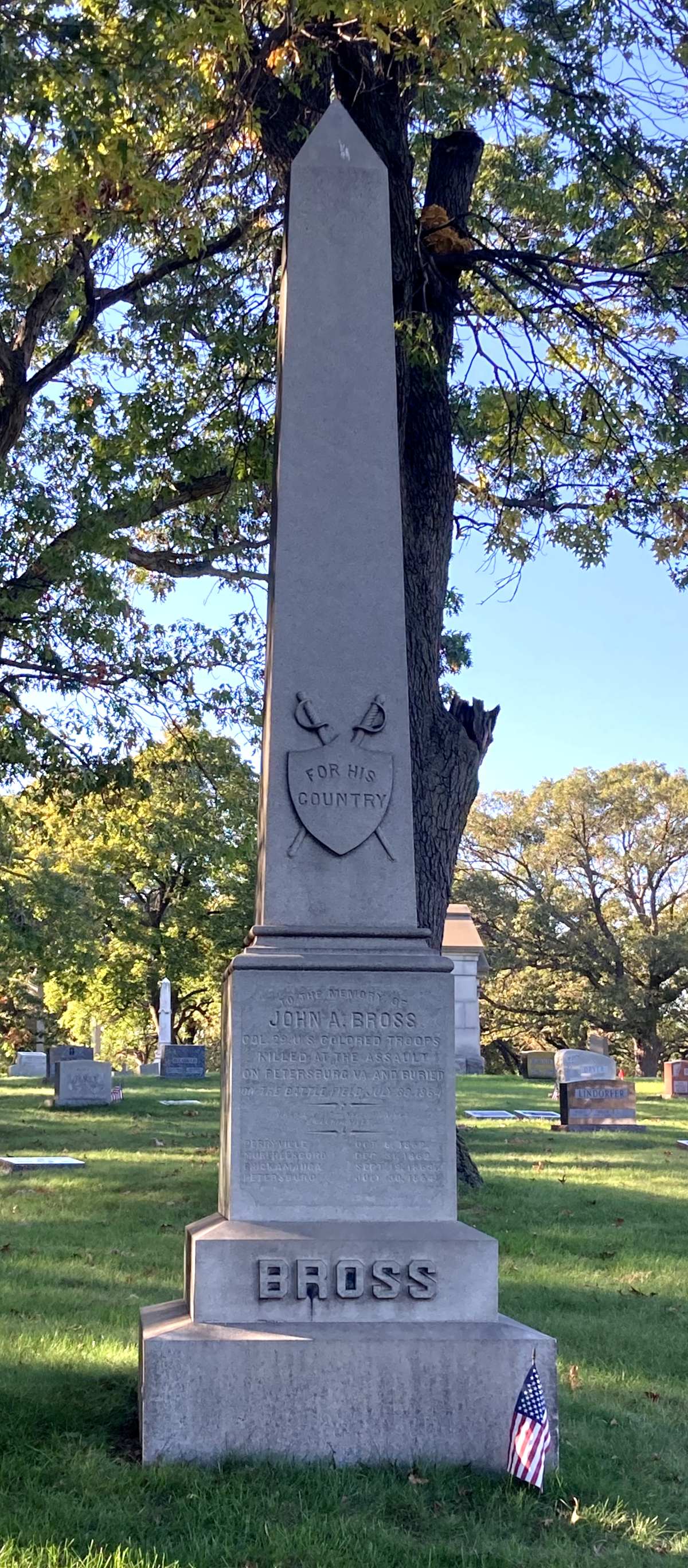
Cenotaph to Bross at Rosehill Cemetery

In 1856 he married Isabella Annetta Mason, called Belle, who had moved to Chicago from Sterling, Illinois and had been a student of John’s when he was a Sunday school teacher. They had a daughter Cora in 1857 and a son Mason in 1860. Cora died in 1861, probably one of the many child victims of the unsanitary water sources in Chicago at that time. John eulogized Cora in a poem he wrote. During the Civil War, Belle moved back to Sterling to live with her family, and corresponded frequently with her husband on the battlefront. Belle and their little son Mason were present at the Chicago railroad station to see John off to Washington, DC and would never see him again. After his death, Belle received many letters from his troops including Private Willis Bogart who wrote in part: “He was loved by everyone, because he was a friend to everyone”.

His great grandson John A. Bross of Chicago, along with his sister Justine Bross Yildiz, chronicled his life and heroic death at the head of his troops in Letters to Belle, containing 87 letters between September 1862 and July 1864 that Colonel Bross wrote home to his wife while away fighting at several of the Civil War’s most important battles recalling not only these battles but insightful portraits of the everyday life of a soldier.

His body was never recovered from the battlefield, but there is a cenotaph to him in Rosehill Cemetery in Chicago.

== See also ==
- Stephen Decatur Bross
- William Bross
