= Fort Pitt Foundry =

- Type: Private
- Industry: Foundry
- Founded: 1804
- Headquarters: Pittsburgh, Pennsylvania
- Key people: Joseph and Alex McClurg
- Products: Cannons and cannonballs for the U.S. military

The Fort Pitt Foundry was a nineteenth-century iron foundry in Pittsburgh, Pennsylvania. It was originally established at Fifth Avenue and Smithfield Street in 1804 by Joseph McClurg, grandfather of Joseph W. McClurg, and his son Alex McClurg, father of bookseller and general Alexander C. McClurg. It was later moved to the area of Pittsburgh now known as the Strip District at 12th and Etna. It was an early producer of ordnance for the United States, and manufactured cannonballs for Commodore Oliver Hazard Perry's forces in the War of 1812. It was best known for the manufacture of large cannon. One of the largest was a 20 inch bore Rodman Gun, a large black powder, smoothbore, muzzle-loading coastal defense gun.

The foundry was closed after the Civil War ended. It was eventually sold to a rival in 1878.
