= Henry Goddard Thomas =

United States general (1837–1897)

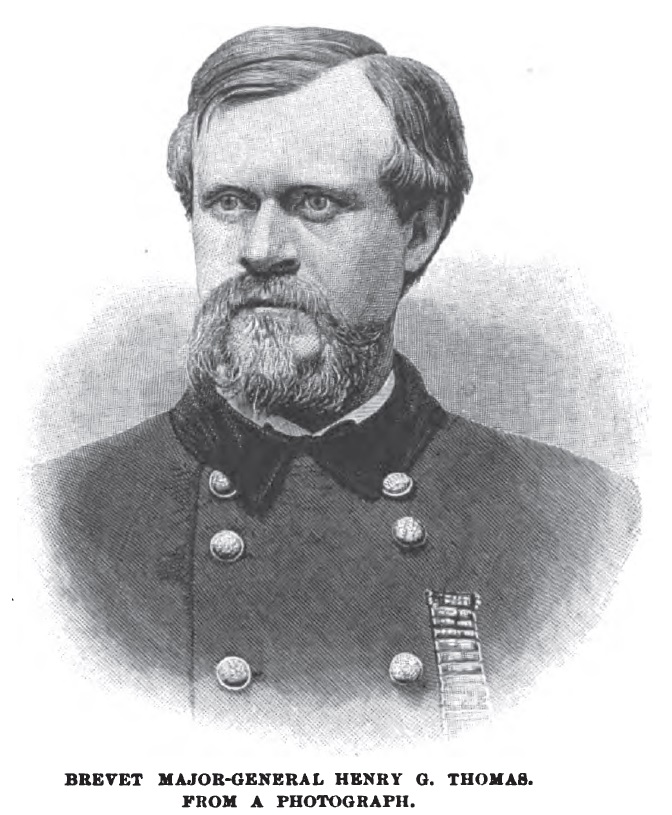
- Born: April 5, 1837; Portland, Maine, U.S.
- Died: January 23, 1897 (aged 59); Oklahoma City, Oklahoma
- Burial place: Evergreen Cemetery, Portland, Maine
- Relatives: William W. Thomas Jr. (brother)
- Military career
- Allegiance: United States; Union
- Branch: Union Army; United States Army
- Service years: 1861–1891
- Rank: Brigadier general; Brevet Major general
- Unit: 5th Maine Infantry Regiment
- Commands: 2nd U.S. Colored Infantry Regiment; 19th U.S. Colored Infantry Regiment; 2nd Bde, 4th Div, IX Corps
- Conflicts: American Civil War

Signature
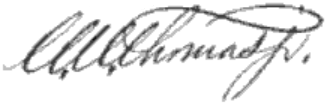

Henry Goddard Thomas (April 5, 1837 – January 23, 1897) was a Union Army general during the American Civil War.

== Early years ==
A native of Portland, Maine, Thomas graduated from Amherst College in 1858 and was admitted to the bar shortly thereafter.

== Career ==
When the Civil War began Thomas enlisted as a private in the 5th Maine Volunteer Infantry Regiment. Commissioned as captain in June 1861, Thomas was present at the First Battle of Bull Run and the Peninsula Campaign among other battles. In February 1863, Thomas was appointed colonel of the 2nd United States Colored Infantry. In December 1863, Thomas was appointed colonel of the 19th United States Colored Infantry. On November 30, 1864, President Abraham Lincoln appointed Thomas a brigadier general of volunteers to rank from his appointment date. The President nominated Thomas for the appointment on December 12, 1864, and the U.S. Senate confirmed the promotion on February 23, 1865. Thomas was mustered out of the volunteers on January 15, 1866, and remained in the Regular Army until he retired in 1891 On March 29, 1867, President Andrew Johnson nominated Thomas for appointment to the grade of brevet major general of volunteers for his service during the war, to rank from March 13, 1865, and the U.S. Senate confirmed the award on April 5, 1867. Henry Goddard Thomas died on January 23, 1897, in Oklahoma City Indian Territory (Oklahoma) and is interred at Evergreen Cemetery in Portland, Maine.

== Personal ==
Thomas was the older brother of diplomat and politician William W. Thomas, Jr.
