= Francis Trowbridge Sherman =

American Civil War general

Francis T. Sherman
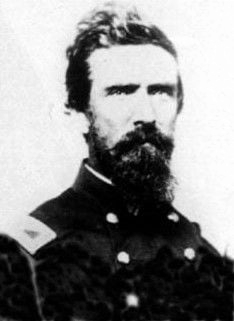
- Born: December 31, 1825; Newtown, Connecticut
- Died: November 9, 1905 (aged 79); Waukegan, Illinois
- Burial place: Graceland Cemetery, Chicago, Illinois
- Military career
- Allegiance: United States of America; Union
- Branch: United States Army; Union Army
- Service years: 1861-1866
- Rank: Brigadier General of Volunteers
- Commands: 88th Illinois Volunteer Infantry Regiment
- Conflicts: American Civil War: Battle of Perryville; Battle of Stones River; Battle of Missionary Ridge; Atlanta campaign; Appomattox Campaign
- Other work: Brick maker, postal clerk, hotel proprietor

Francis Trowbridge Sherman (1825–1905) was a Union general during the American Civil War. He served in the cavalry and infantry, seeing action in both the Western Theater and Eastern Theater.

== Biography ==
=== Early life ===
Sherman was born in Connecticut in 1825 but his family moved to Illinois in 1834 where his father, Francis Cornwall Sherman became heavily involved in Chicago politics serving as alderman and mayor of the city and as a state representative. Francis T. Sherman traveled to West to participate in the California Gold Rush before returning to Illinois.

=== Civil War service ===
Early in the Civil War, Sherman served as lieutenant colonel of the 56th Illinois Volunteer Infantry Regiment and major of the 12th Regiment Illinois Volunteer Cavalry without seeing any significant action. On September 4, 1862 he was appointed colonel of the 88th Illinois Volunteer Infantry Regiment (a.k.a. 2nd Board of Trade Regiment). Sherman led his regiment at the battles of Perryville and Stones River. He was not with the army during the battle of Chickamauga but took command of a brigade shortly after the battle. His brigade became the 1st Brigade in Philip H. Sheridan's 2nd Division of the newly formed IV Corps. Sherman was one of the brigade commanders who made the charge up Missionary Ridge during the battle of Chattanooga. He continued leading his brigade during the early part of the Atlanta campaign at Rocky Face Ridge and Resaca before he was appointed as the chief of staff to the IV Corps. He served in that capacity during the rest of the campaign until he was captured outside Atlanta on July 7, 1864. He was officially exchanged on October 7, 1864, and was assigned to the Army of the Potomac as the assistant inspector general of the Cavalry Corps during the Appomattox Campaign. Sherman was brevetted to brigadier general on March 13, 1865, and received a full promotion to brigadier general of volunteers on July 21, 1865. He was mustered out of the volunteer services on January 15, 1866.

=== Later life ===
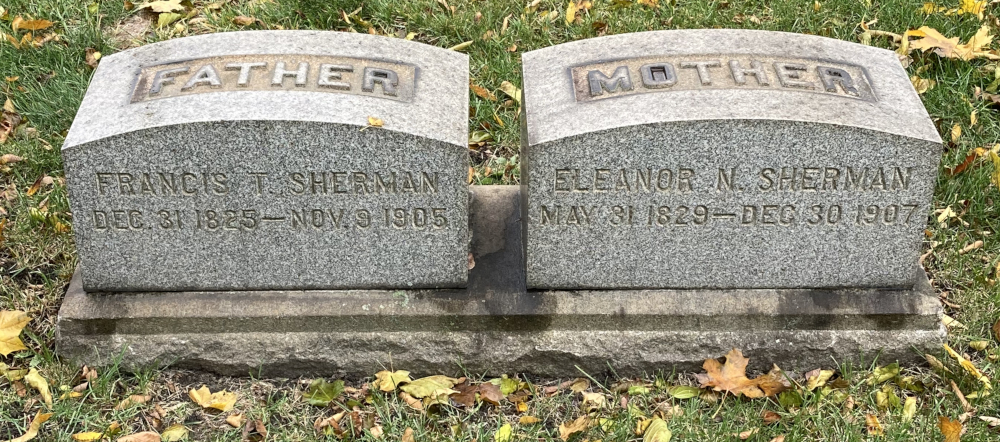
Sherman's grave at Graceland Cemetery

Following the war, Sherman embarked on a series of business ventures, starting with managing a sugar plantation in Louisiana for a year before returning to Chicago. Back in Chicago, he worked as the postmaster of Chicago for two years before starting a stone and sand manufacturing company called Sherman, Haley & Company. The business was ruined in 1871 by the Great Chicago Fire, which forced Sherman to seek business ventures elsewhere in the U.S. before he settled in Waukegan, Illinois, where he died in 1905.

He was buried at Graceland Cemetery in Chicago.

His daughter Lulu married United States Congressman J. Frank Aldrich in 1878.

== See also ==
- List of American Civil War generals (Union)
