= 19th United States Colored Infantry Regiment =

19th Regiment, U.S. Colored Troops
- Active: December 25, 1863 - January 15, 1867
- Country: United States
- Allegiance: Union
- Branch: Infantry
- Engagements: American Civil War: Siege of Petersburg; Battle of the Crater; Battle of Globe Tavern; Appomattox Campaign; Third Battle of Petersburg; Battle of Appomattox Court House

The 19th United States Colored Infantry was an infantry regiment that served in the Union Army during the American Civil War. The regiment was composed of African American enlisted men, mostly from southern Maryland and that state's Eastern Shore. Commanded by white officers, it was authorized by the Bureau of Colored Troops which was created by the United States War Department on May 22, 1863.

== Service ==
The 19th U.S. Colored Infantry was organized at Camp Stanton in Benedict, Maryland beginning December 25, 1863 and mustered in for three-year service under the command of Colonel Henry Goddard Thomas. The regiment was attached to 2nd Brigade, 4th Division, IX Corps, Army of the Potomac, April to September 1864. 2nd Brigade, 3rd Division, IX Corps, to December 1864. 3rd Brigade, 3rd Division, XXV Corps, to January 1865. 3rd Brigade, 1st Division, XXV Corps, to January 1866. Department of Texas, to January 1867.

Initially posted to provost (guard) duty in Baltimore, Maryland, beginning on March 1, 1864, they were described as having "great proficiency in discipline and drill" and praised for their "bearing and military qualities", despite the prejudice of the times against "colored troops". The next month, they were ordered to join the Army of the Potomac under the command of Gen. Ulysses S. Grant in the Overland Campaign. Following skirmishes en route, the 19th Regiment engaged in their first major combat on May 6, 1864, at the Battle of the Wilderness. They later participated in the Siege of Petersburg, and sustained heavy casualties. Praised for their "conspicuous gallantry", the victorious African-American Marylanders were among the first Union troops to enter Richmond, Virginia, when the Confederate capital fell in April, 1865.

== Detailed service ==
Duty at Camp Stanton, Benedict, Md., until March 1864, and at Camp Birney until April, after which they were in the Campaign from the Rapidan to the James River, Va., May and June 1864. Guarded trains through the Wilderness. Before Petersburg, Va., June 15–18. Siege operations against Petersburg and Richmond, Va., June 16, 1864 to April 2, 1865. Mine Explosion, Petersburg, July 30, 1864. Weldon Railroad August 18–21. Fort Sedgwick September 28. Poplar Grove Church September 29–30. Hatcher's Run October 27–28. Actions on the Bermuda Hundred front November 17–18. Duty at Bermuda Hundred until March 1865. Appomattox Campaign March 28-April 9. Hatcher's Run March 29–31. Assault and capture of Petersburg April 2. Pursuit of Lee April 3–9. Appomattox Court House April 9. Surrender of Lee and his army. Duty at Petersburg and City Point until June. Moved to Texas June 13-July 3. Duty at Brownsville and on the Rio Grande River in Texas, until January 1867. The 19th U.S. Colored Infantry mustered out of service January 15, 1867.

== Casualties ==
The regiment lost a total of 294 men during service; 3 officers and 47 enlisted men killed or mortally wounded, one officer and 243 enlisted men died of disease.

== Commanders ==
- Colonel Henry Goddard Thomas
- Colonel Joseph G. Perkins
- Lieutenant Colonel William Welsh

== See also ==
- List of United States Colored Troops Civil War Units
- United States Colored Troops
