= McClurg Building (Chicago) =

Office skyscraper in Chicago, Illinois

- U.S. National Register of Historic Places
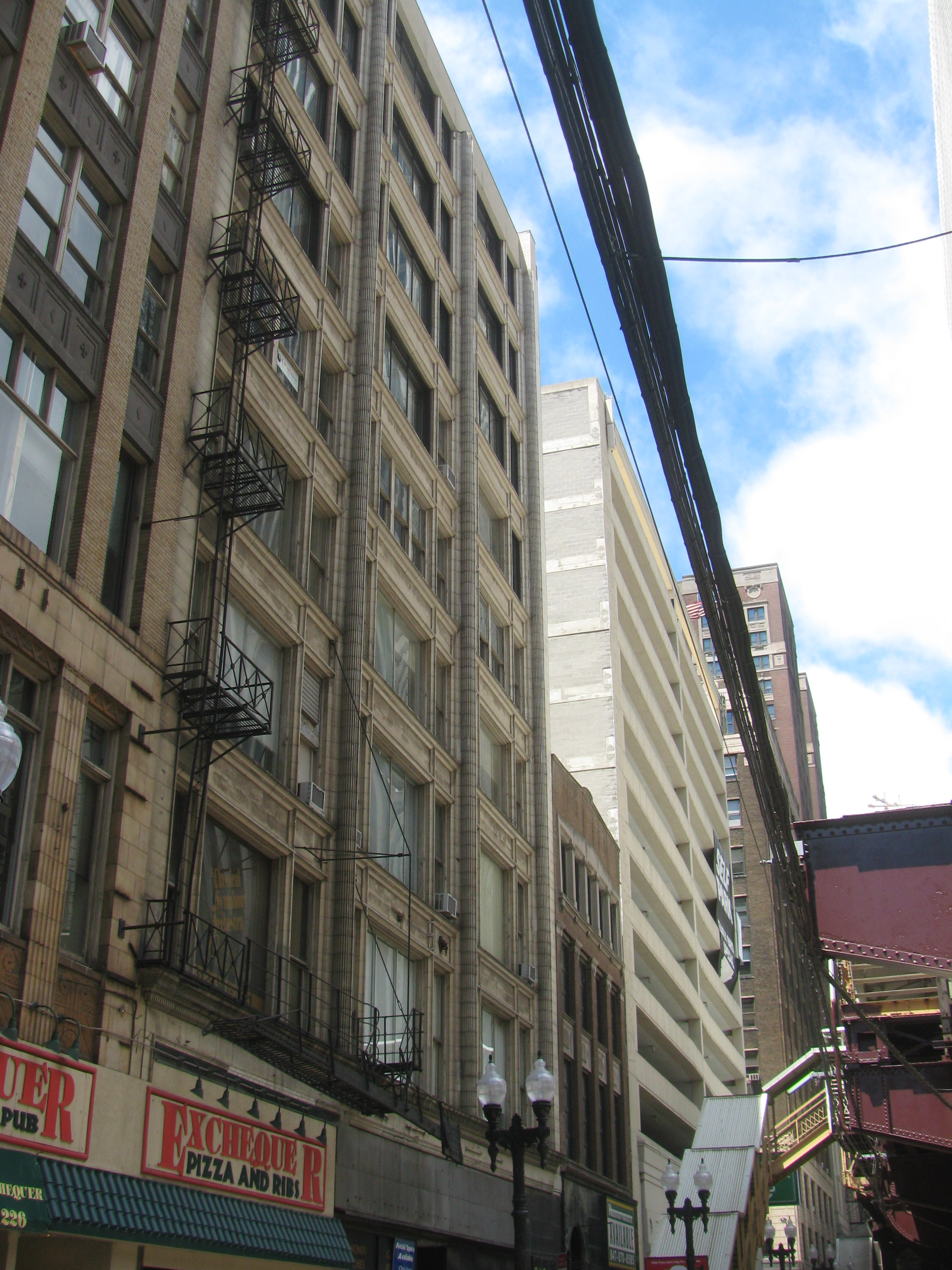

- Location within Chicago metropolitan area Location within Illinois Location within the United States
- Location: 218 S. Wabash Ave., Chicago, Illinois
- Coordinates: 41°52′44″N 87°37′34″W
- Area: 0.3 acres (0.12 ha)
- Built: 1899
- Architect: Holabird & Roche
- Architectural style: Chicago
- NRHP reference No.: 70000235
- Added to NRHP: August 17, 1970

The McClurg Building is a historic skyscraper in the Loop community area of Chicago, Illinois. The building was built in 1899 and designed by Chicago school architects Holabird & Roche. At nine stories tall and 80 feet (24 m) by 150 feet (46 m) at its base, the building is one of the smallest skyscrapers in Chicago. The building's Wabash Street facade has 9,000 square feet (840 m^{2}) of windows bordered by terra cotta piers and spandrels; the amount of window space was necessitated by the absence of windows on the sides of the building. The A.C. McClurg publishing company was the building's main occupant and gave the building its name.

The McClurg Building was added to the National Register of Historic Places on August 17, 1970.

== Tenants ==
- Exchequer Restaurant and Pub occupies a portion of the first floor, though its street address is 226 South Wabash, the neighboring building.
- Roosevelt University's Dance Studios are located on the third floor.
- Chicago Youth Centers, a non-profit focusing on urban youth, is headquartered on the sixth floor.
- UNITE HERE's Local 1 and national health benefits offices are on the building's seventh and eighth floors, respectively.
- IA Collaborative, a design and innovation consulting firm, occupies the ninth floor and tenth floor penthouse.
