= St. Dominic Catholic Church (Washington, D.C.) =

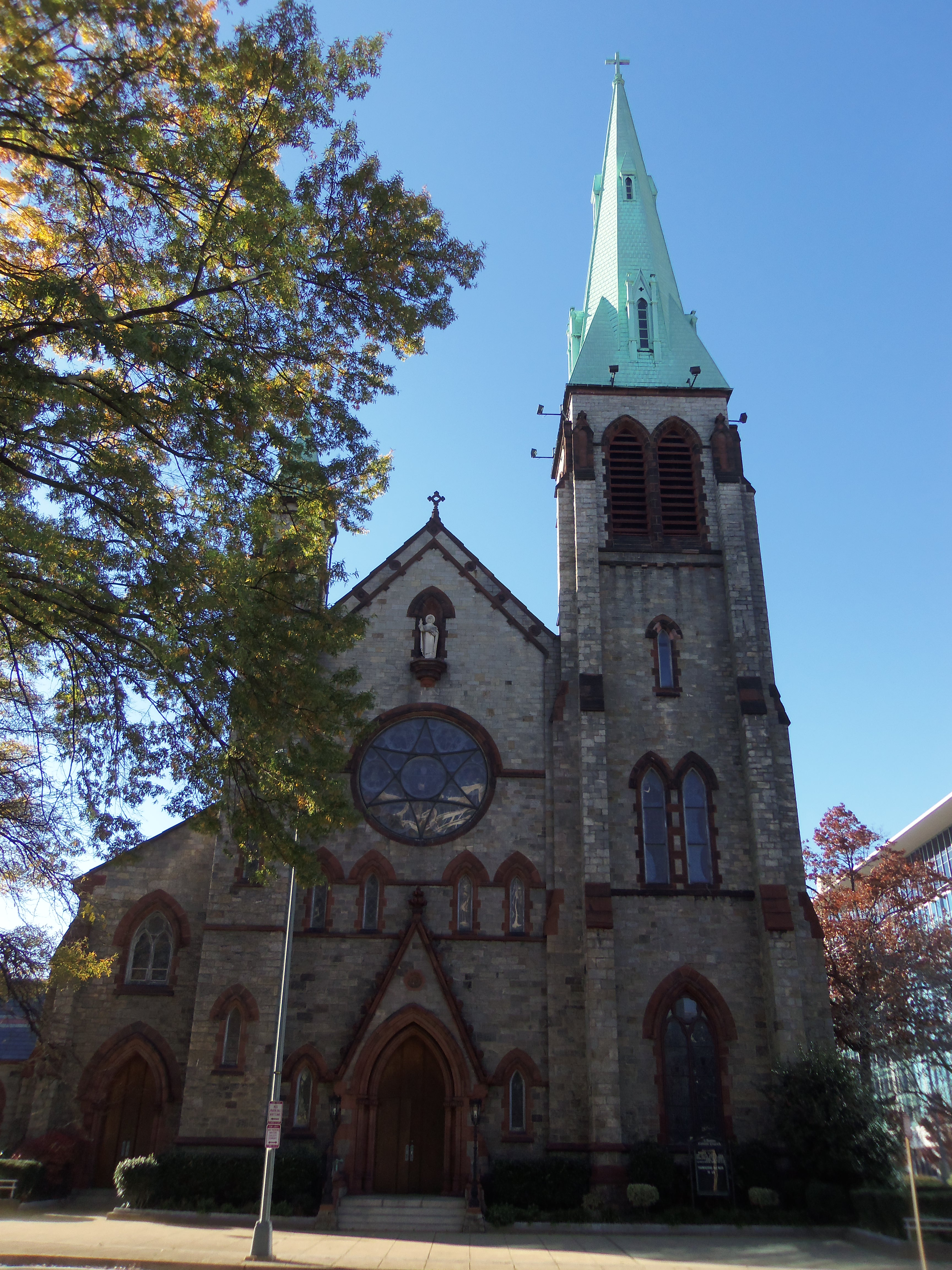
- Saint Dominic Catholic Church in SW DC

- 38°52′58.7″N 77°01′14.4″W
- Location: 630 E St SW, Washington, D.C.
- Country: United States
- Denomination: Catholic
- Website: stdominicchurch.org

Administration
- Archdiocese: Washington

Clergy
- Pastor(s): George P. Schommer, OP, Bede Shipps, OP

St. Dominic Church is a parish of the Roman Catholic Church in the United States, established in 1852. It is located in Southwest Washington, D.C. in the Archdiocese of Washington, and is administered by the Order of Preachers, more commonly known as the Dominicans, in the Province of St. Joseph (Eastern).

== Location ==
The historic parish church and priory are located at 630 E St SW in Washington, near the United States Department of Housing and Urban Development and L'Enfant Plaza, and three blocks south of the National Mall. The nearest Metro station is L'Enfant Plaza Station.

== History ==
=== Origins ===
St. Dominic Church was built on land held by Catholic families or institutions since at least 1735. The land was owned by widow Ann Rozier Carroll, a relative of Charles Carroll, signer of the Declaration of Independence. Carroll remarried to Benjamin Young, Commissioner of Crown Lands. Although Maryland was founded by Catholic Cecil Calvert, 2nd Baron Baltimore as the first English colony in America permitting religious freedom, the English government took over Maryland's government following the Protestant Revolution in 1689. Under English rule, Benjamin Young lost his post when he became Catholic. The family lived at a manor house with a private house chapel on what is now G St. SW between 9th and 10th St. near present day L'Enfant Plaza.

Benjamin Young's son, Notley Rozier Young, inherited the family property, which included much of what is now Southwest D.C. He married Eleanor Digges, and after his first wife's death, married Mary Carroll, sister of John Carroll, the first bishop in the United States. The property passed to his five children: Ann, Eleanor, Benjamin, Nicholas, and Notley Jr. In particular, Square 466, where St. Dominic Church was later built, passed to his namesake son, Rev. Notley Young, Jr. S.J., a professor of philosophy at neighboring Georgetown College, through whom the property passed to the College. In 1853, Dominicans purchased the parcel to build a parish from Georgetown for $5055.

Until the church was built, the Dominicans stayed with and said Mass at the residence of George Mattingly. The householder's grandfather, Robert E. Mattingly, a judge in the District of Columbia, recounted that "people attending would stand and kneel out into the street during the Mass." George Mattingly, originally of St. Mary's County, Maryland, was superintendent of the Norfolk Steamboat Company, and later donated the stained glass window of the Sacred Heart of Jesus. A further family connection to the Dominican order came when Nicholas Young married the sister of Rev. Edward Fenwick, O.P., who in 1805 founded the St. Joseph's Province, the first Dominican institution in the United States.

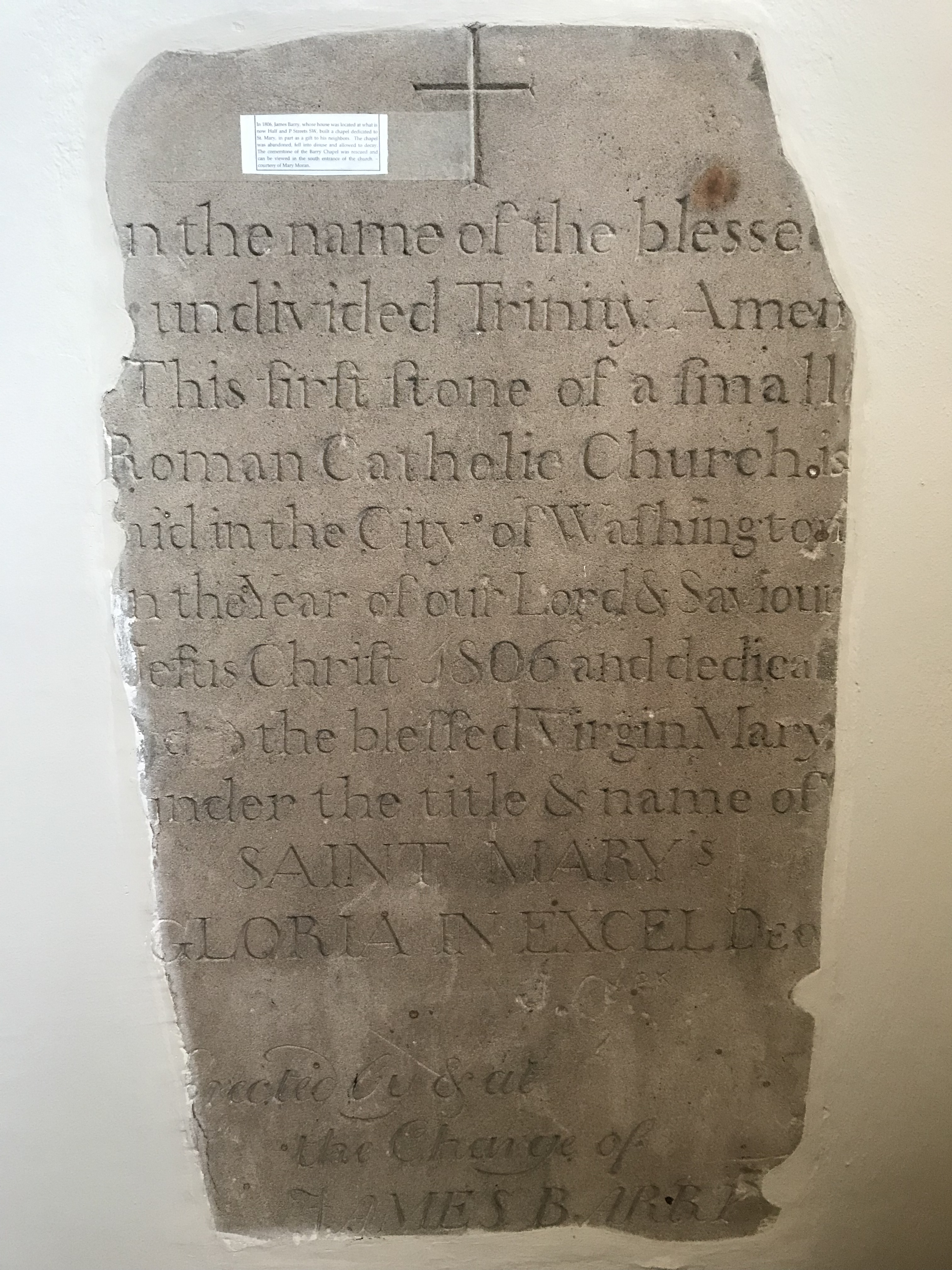
St. Mary's Chapel cornerstone

The church's southern entrance contains a relic of the first Catholic chapel built in Washington, D.C. This is an engraved dark sandstone, which was the cornerstone of St. Mary's Chapel, a.k.a. "Barry's Chapel", built by James Barry (1755?–1808) and dedicated in 1806. Barry's Chapel stood at F & 10th St SW under the present-day Interstate 395 highway.

=== Founding ===
St. Dominic Church was founded in 1852, organized by Rev. George A.J. Wilson, and opened on March 19, 1854. It was set in an area of the city known as "The Island" because, at that time, a canal ran where Constitution Avenue is today which connected the Potomac and the Anacostia Rivers.

As the congregation grew, it was recognized that a new sanctuary was needed to hold all the congregants. This new church was dedicated on June 13, 1875, by James Roosevelt Bayley, Archbishop of Baltimore.

After President James A. Garfield was assassinated on July 2, 1881, St. Dominic's joined other local churches in an "Appeal to Heaven" in praying for the president, with Rev. Fr. Rochford delivering a sermon denouncing the assassination and praying for the president's recovery.

On March 12, 1885, the interior of the church was destroyed in a fire.

=== Fire of 1885 ===
On March 12, 1885, the interior of the church was destroyed in a fire.^{[4][5]} The fire broke out shortly after 10 A.M. in the boiler room on the west side of the church basement. It spread into the church above, eventually engulfing the altar. The church's engineer, Florence McCauliff, housekeeper Kate Duffy, and Officer Burns of the nearby First Precinct Station House rushed to the sanctuary to save articles from the fire. They did not leave until they were driven out by the flames. Officer Burns sustained serious burn injuries to his hands and wrists, but the three were successful in removing everything of value from the altar.

The fire brigade succeeded in extinguishing the flames before the church was destroyed, but left holes in the roof and stained glass windows in the process. Somber and tearful parishioners gathered outside the burning church. At 2 P.M., when the fire was finally extinguished, they walked into the ankle-deep water inside and carried out everything they could move. The event caused an estimated $50,000 worth of damage to the church, including the total loss of a $2,000 organ and the destruction of a $1,000 stained glass window over the main entrance. Members of the local community—both Catholics and non-Catholics—banded together to raise funds and rebuild the church in a remarkably short time.

=== Urban renewal ===
Southwest Washington's population dropped by a quarter between 1920 and 1930 and the Federal government designated Southwest "blighted". In 1945, Congress established the D.C. Redevelopment Land Agency (RLA) under the District of Columbia Redevelopment Act. Thus "urban renewal" began in Southwest Washington. Goldie Schneider, owner of a hardware store at 716 Fourth St, SW, challenged congressional authority to declared blighted areas eligible for demolition in "the public interest." Goldie's son Joseph H. Schneider, president of the Southwest Businessmen's Association, litigated the case all the way to the Supreme Court, but lost (Berman v. Parker). More than 4,000 families were displaced when their homes in Southwest Washington were demolished. At the time, the Most Rev. Philp Hannon, diocesan chancellor and representative to the Federal City Council, threatened legal action if St. Dominic Church was not appropriately compensated for confiscated property. U.S. Rep. Aime J. Forand (D-RI) introduced a bill to amend the parish's 1856 charter to allow the church's civil corporation to receive compensation at the contemporary value of the property, rather than the cap set at its charter written over a hundred years before.

The construction of Interstate I-395 and its 6th & 7th Street ramps razed the St. Dominic Priory, School, and Convent.

=== Priests ===
==== Pastors ====
1. George Schommer, O.P. (2022–present)
2. Jordan Turano, O.P. (2020–2022)
3. Hyacinth Marie Cordell, O.P. (2018–2020)
4. George Schommer, O.P. (2011-2018)
5. Norman Francis Haddad (1981-1993)
6. Charles McKenna (1975)
7. John A. Nowlen, O.P. (1964)
8. F.X. Finnegan, O.P. (1957)
9. Andrew M. Whelan, O.P. (1952-53)
10. James B. Hinch (1907)
11. J.C. Kent, O.P. (1902)
12. E.D. Donnelly, O.P. (1888)
13. Rochford (1877-1881)
14. J. A. Bokel (1865)
15. George Augustine Joseph Wilson (1852-1867)

==== Parochial vicars ====
1. Bede Shipps, O.P. (2018–present)
2. Hyacinth Marie Cordell, O.P. ( -2018)
3. Norman Francis Haddad (1962-1972)

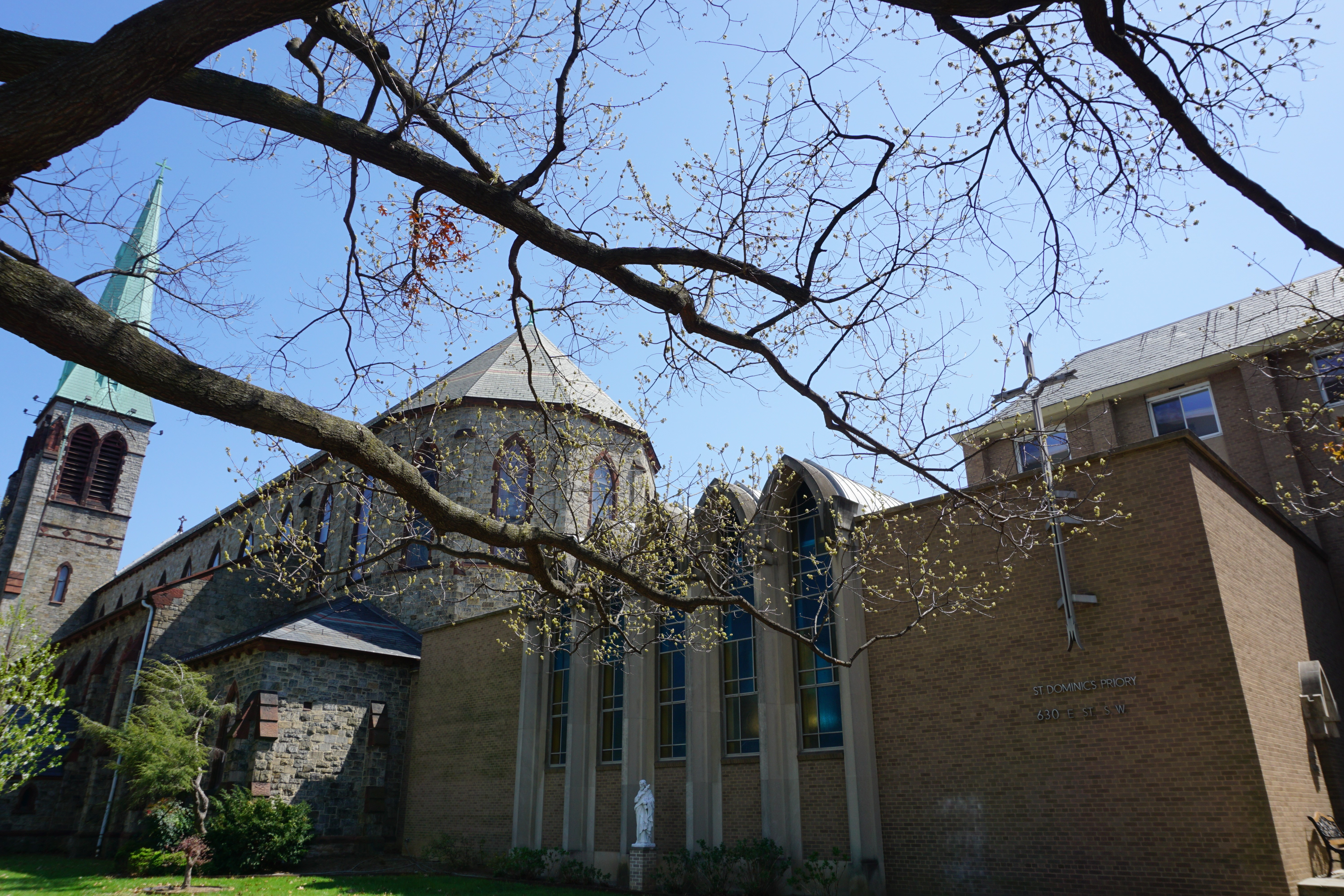
Friars' Chapel

=== Priory ===
The old St. Dominic's convent was finished in the summer of 1880 and contained 36 rooms.

The old priory was at 515 Sixth St., SW. Following the demolition of the original priory under the D.C. Redevelopment Land Agency, the Dominicans leased a building at 439 Sixth St., SW. Finally, in 1960, ground was broken to construct the present-day new chapel, and the four-story, 40-room residence, including a center for assisted living for aged friars.

==== Priors ====
1. Jordan Turano, O.P. (2020–present)
2. Jacob Restrick, O.P. (2017-2020)
3. Carleton Jones, O.P. (2014-2017)
4. John A. Nowlen, O.P. (1960)
5. Timothy P. O'Rourke (1907)
6. Hinch

=== Historical lay communities ===
==== Holy Name Society ====
St. Dominic Church hosted a chapter of the Holy Name Society.

==== The Ladies Sodality of Our Lady ====
St. Dominic Church hosted a chapter of the Ladies' Sodality.

==== Young Catholics' Friend Society ====
A philanthropic group known as the "Young Catholics' Friend Society" which funded free schools, is mentioned in connection with the parish and diocese in news articles in the mid-19th century.

=== School ===
A school existed in connection to St. Dominic's until the 1950s, when urban renewal began in much of Southwest D.C. The school sat where a section of Interstate 395 runs today. In 1948, during an era of widespread racial segregation, Patrick Cardinal O'Boyle, Archbishop of Washington, directed the integration of all Catholic schools and activities. The last graduation was held in 1957, before the demolition of the school for urban renewal.

=== Lyndon B. Johnson ===
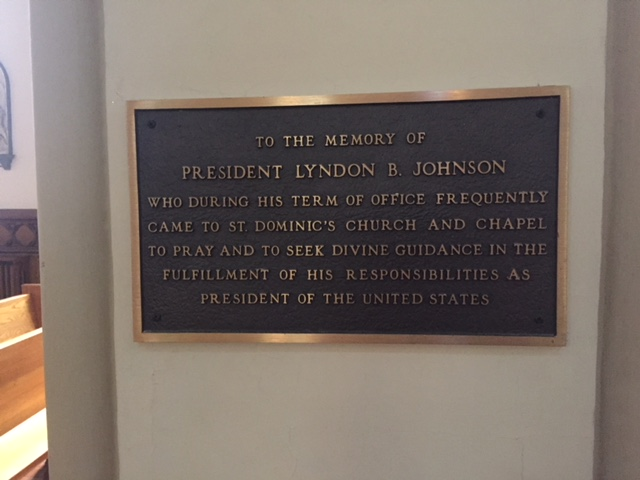
Plaque inside the church honoring Lyndon B. Johnson

Lyndon B. Johnson occasionally visited St. Dominic's during his tenure as President of the United States. His interest in the Catholic Church began when he was younger and developed over time. He was sworn in as President on a Catholic Missal that had been owned by John F. Kennedy, because a Bible was not in the immediate area at the time of JFK's assassination. His daughter, Luci Baines Johnson, converted to the Catholic faith at age eighteen in preparation for her marriage at the Basilica of the National Shrine of the Immaculate Conception.

LBJ would make frequent visits to St. Dominic's to pray and reflect with the friars, and Luci often asked her "Little Monks" to pray for the President during the Vietnam War. Though he received instruction to become a member of the church from a friar, he never formally entered. He would maintain an interest in the faith through the rest of his life and would have a Catholic service said at his graveside.

== Community ==
=== Lay discipleship communities ===
==== Dominican Third Order ====
St. Dominic Church hosts a chapter of the Dominican Third Order, which meets monthly to the present day.

==== Saint Dominic Young Adults ====
St. Dominic's Young Adults, a young adult discipleship group begun on the feast of St. Thérèse of Lisieux in 2015, continues to the present day.

==== St. Dominic Cenacle ====
St. Dominic Cenacle, an adult discipleship group begun in 2017, continues to the present day.

==== Knights of Columbus ====
The Knights of Columbus are a Catholic-based Fraternal Organization engaged in charity, both local and global in scope, Life Insurance, and faith-based institutional investing. Two chapters of the organization meet at St. Dominic Church presently:

- St. Dominic Church has hosted the O'Boyle Council of the D.C. Knights of Columbus since ####.
- St. Dominic Church has hosted the Hickey Assembly since ####.

The church is engaged in a variety of local social and service activities, including So Others Might Eat, visitation of the sick and homebound, and The Proverbs 24 Community (P24).

== Art and music ==
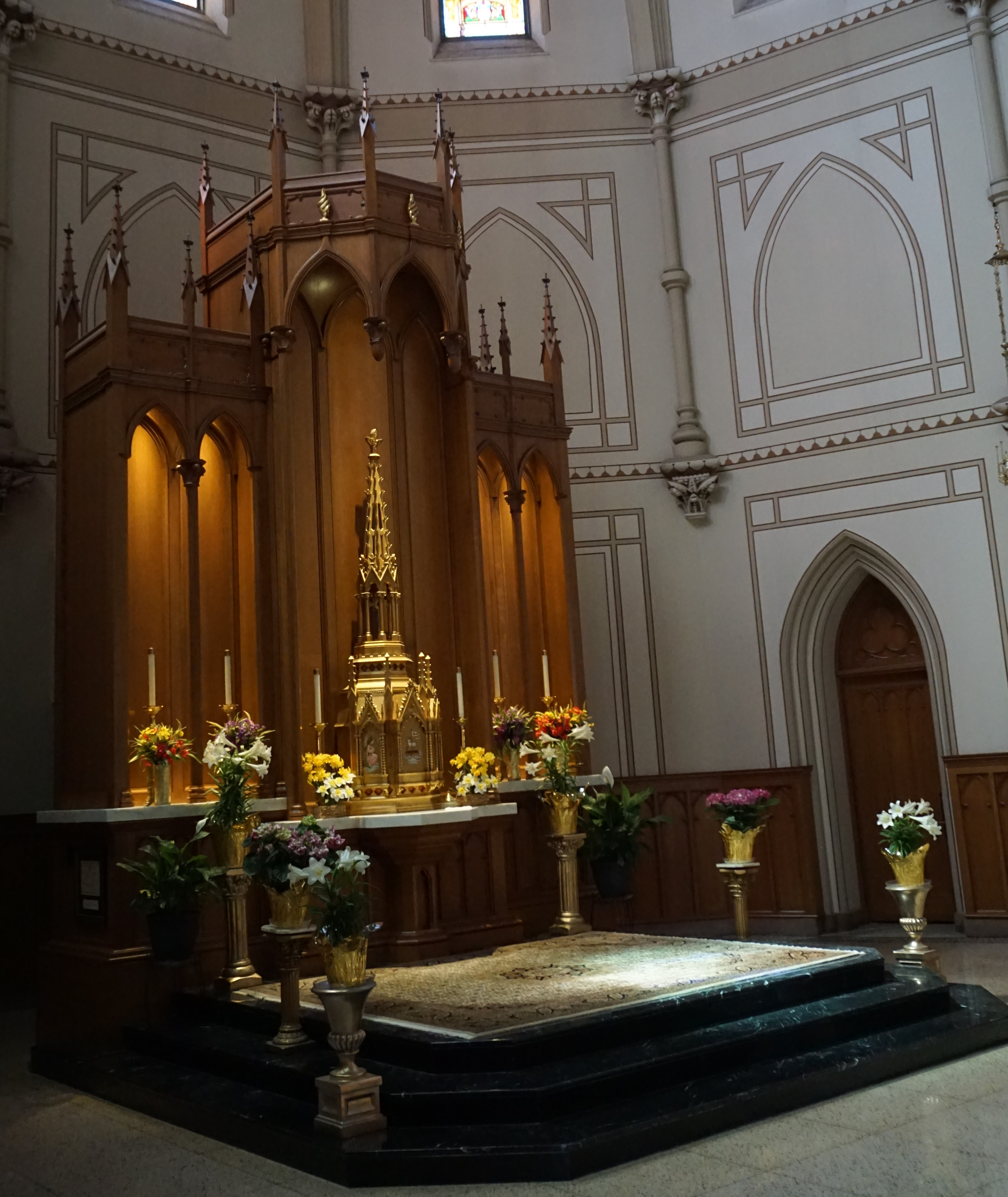
Reredos and tabernacle

The current reredos was installed in 2013.

A tabernacle from Belgium was installed around 2011.

The ornately carved wooden altar was a gift of L. Kevin and Anne Lynch in memory of Rev. Francis Hyacinth Roth, O.P. (1899-1985), who was ordained at St. Dominic Church in 1938 and served in Boyce, Louisiana according to a memorial plaque.

=== Architecture ===
The architect of the church was Patrick C. Keely.

=== Stained glass ===
Some of the stained glass windows in the sanctuary date back to 1875, when the church was constructed. The central window above the main altar depicts the Sacred Heart of Christ. It is immediately flanked by a window of the Blessed Virgin Mary and another of Saint Joseph, the latter of which was a gift of Ellen Ewing Sherman, wife of General William Tecumseh Sherman, and mother of Thomas Ewing Sherman, S.J. The sanctuary further has two windows depicting Saints Dominic and Thomas Aquinas.

Besides the sanctuary windows, others also date to 1875, including a large rose window portraying St. Cecilia, as well as windows depicting St. Peter, St. Paul, and Dominican shields. However, the majority of the church's stained glass windows were installed in 1965 and created by the Heimer company. The windows depict scenes from the life of St. Dominic and other Dominican saints.

=== The Hilborne Roosevelt Organ ===
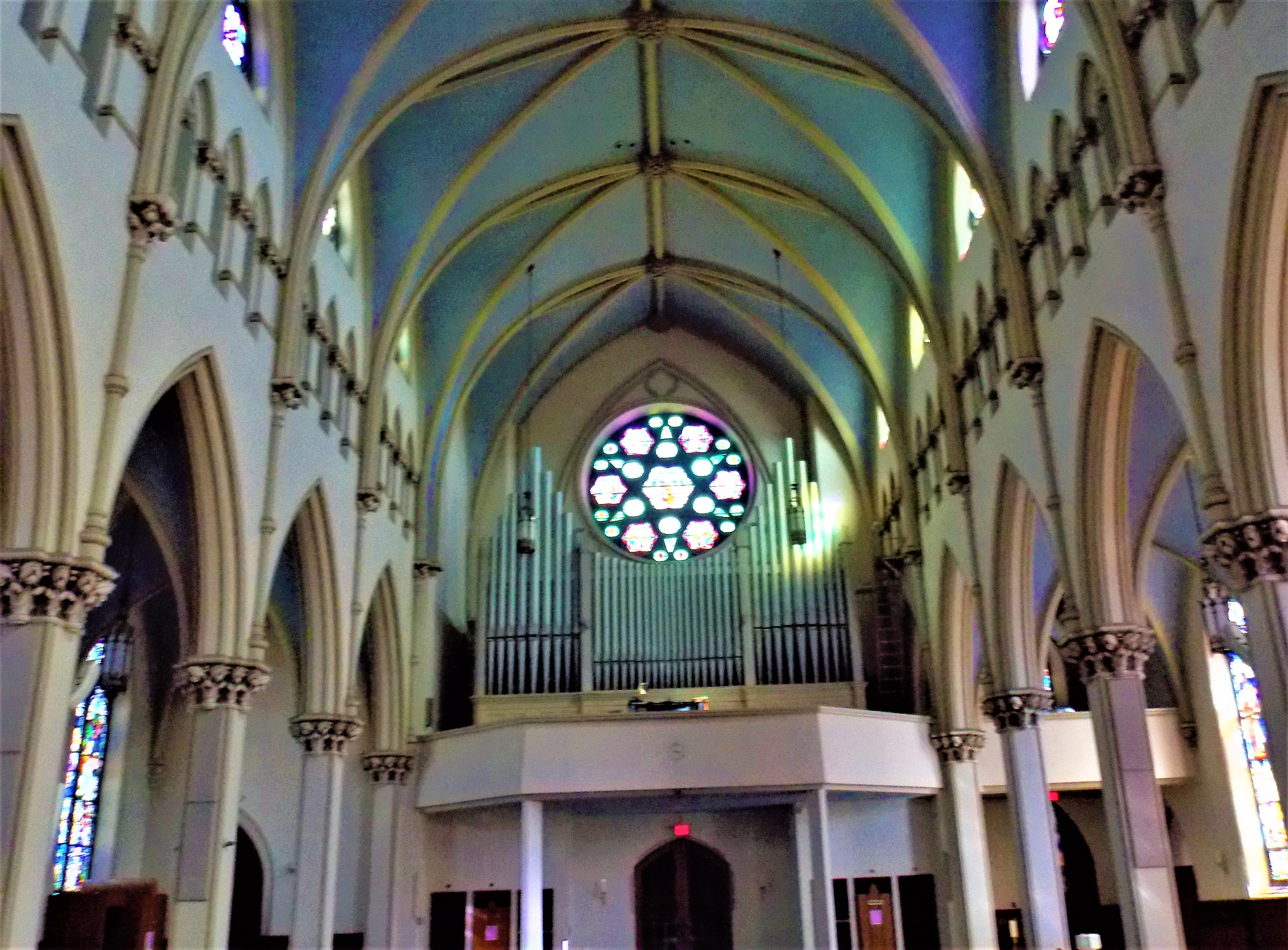
The Hilborne Roosevelt Organ

An organ made by Hillborne Roosevelt of Roosevelt Organ Works, the cousin of President Theodore Roosevelt, was installed in the parish in 1887.

=== Bell ===
Cast in 1898, the bell bears the following inscription:

Laudo Deum verum, plebum voco, conjugo clerum, defunctos ploro, pestem fugo, festa decoro, funera plango, fulgura frango, sabata rengo, ex[c]ito lentos, dissipo ventos, paco crucentos [I praise the true God, call the people, gather the clergy. I mourn the dead, drive away pestilence, grace festivals. I lament at funerals, shatter lightening, sound the coming of the Sabbath. I arouse the indolent, dissipate the winds, and appease the avengeful.]

St. Dominic's Church, Washington DC, McShane Bell Foundry, Baltimore, MD 1898. America's last Church Bell foundry, American-made since 1858.

Leo XIII, Pope; William McKinley, President, U.S.; James Cardinal Gibbons, Archbishop of Baltimore; Fr. F.L. Kearney O.P. Provincial of St. Joseph Province; Fr. J.P. Moran, O.P., Prior of Dt. Dominic; Fr. J.P. Valleley, O.P.; Sub-Prior of St Dominic; Fr. F.A. Spencer, O.P. Ex-Provincial; Fr. J.A. Bokel, O.P.; Fr. T.P. O'Rourke, O.P.; William Johnson, President of Holy Name Society; Mary A. O'Connor, President of Our Lady's Society; Margaret Travers, President of the Blessed Virgin Sodality; March MDCCCXCVIII

== Shrines ==
=== St. Martin de Porres ===
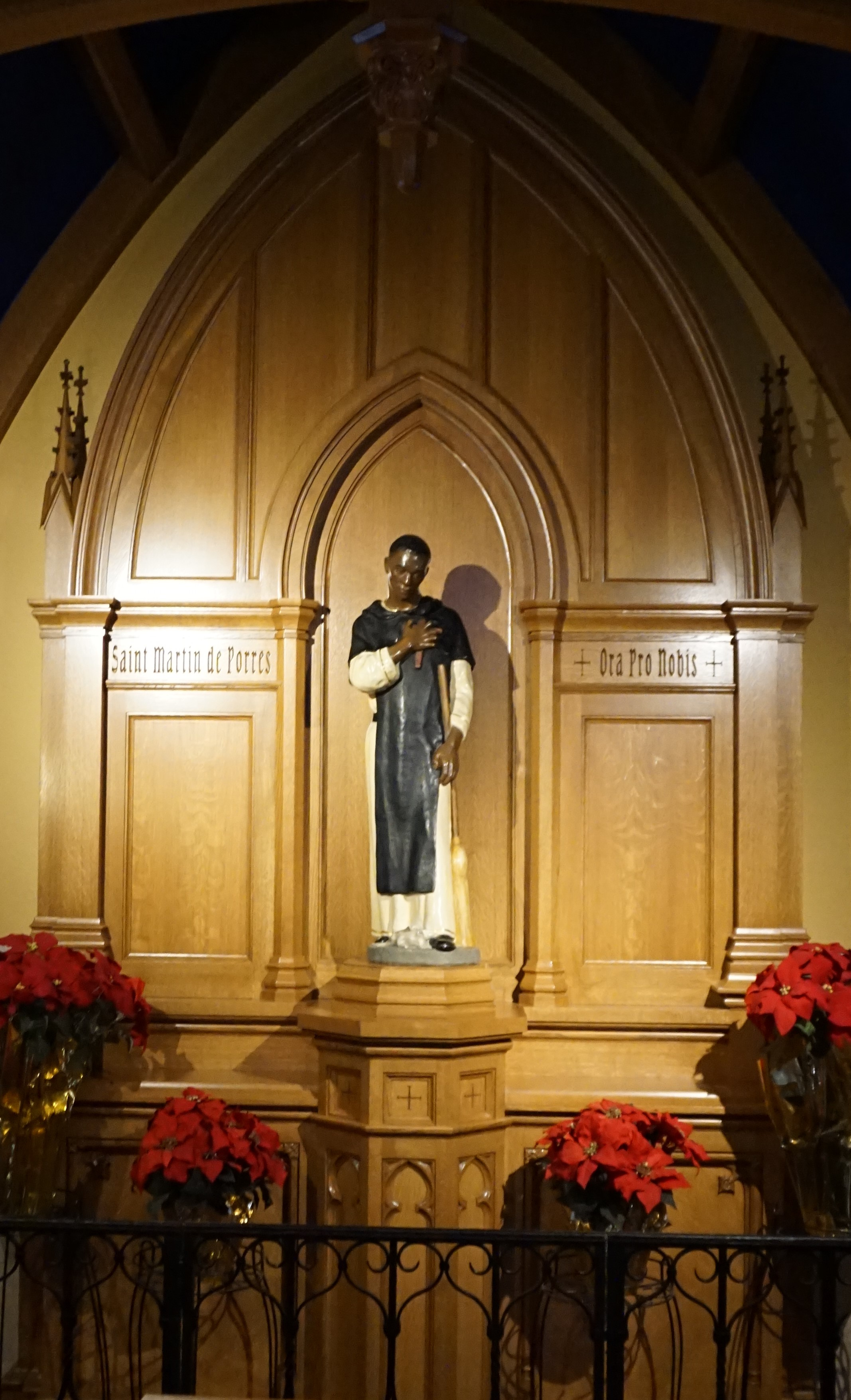
St. Martin de Porres

A sculpture of Dominican Saint Martin de Porres by Dominican artist Thomas McGlynn, O.P., is featured in a shrine blessed on February 6, 2018 in memory of former pastor Fr. Norman Haddad, O.P. St Martin de Porres was a Dominican saint who lived from 1579 to 1639 in Lima, Peru and is known for his deep prayer and devotion and daily ministry to the poor.

=== St. Jude ===
The National Rosary Shrine of Saint Jude was established in Washington in the early 1930s. In the fall of 1998, the Dominican Fathers of the Province of Saint Joseph decided to combine the Rosary Shrine of Saint Jude, which had been founded in the 1920s in Detroit, Michigan with the National Rosary Shrine of Saint Jude (Washington DC).

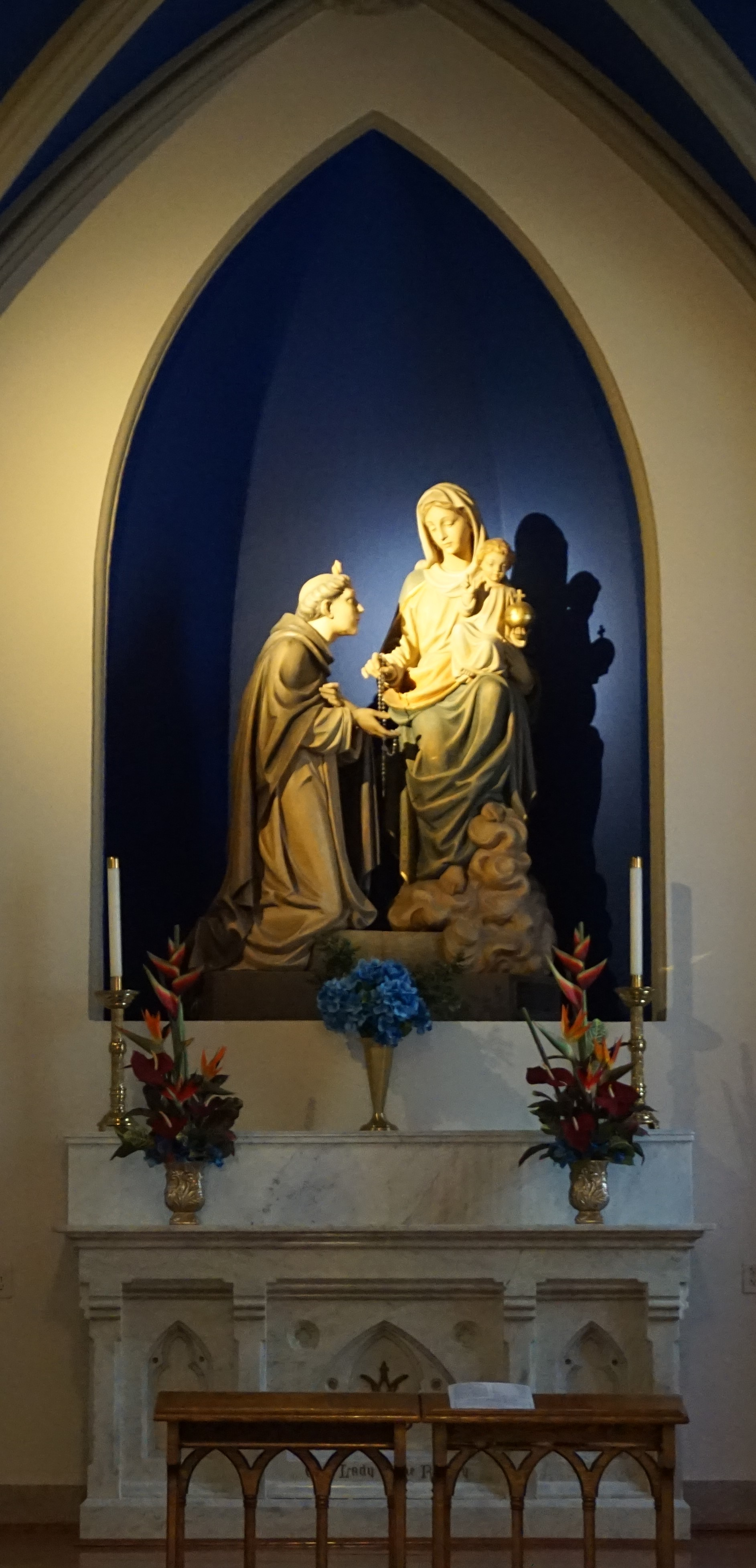
Rosary Shrine

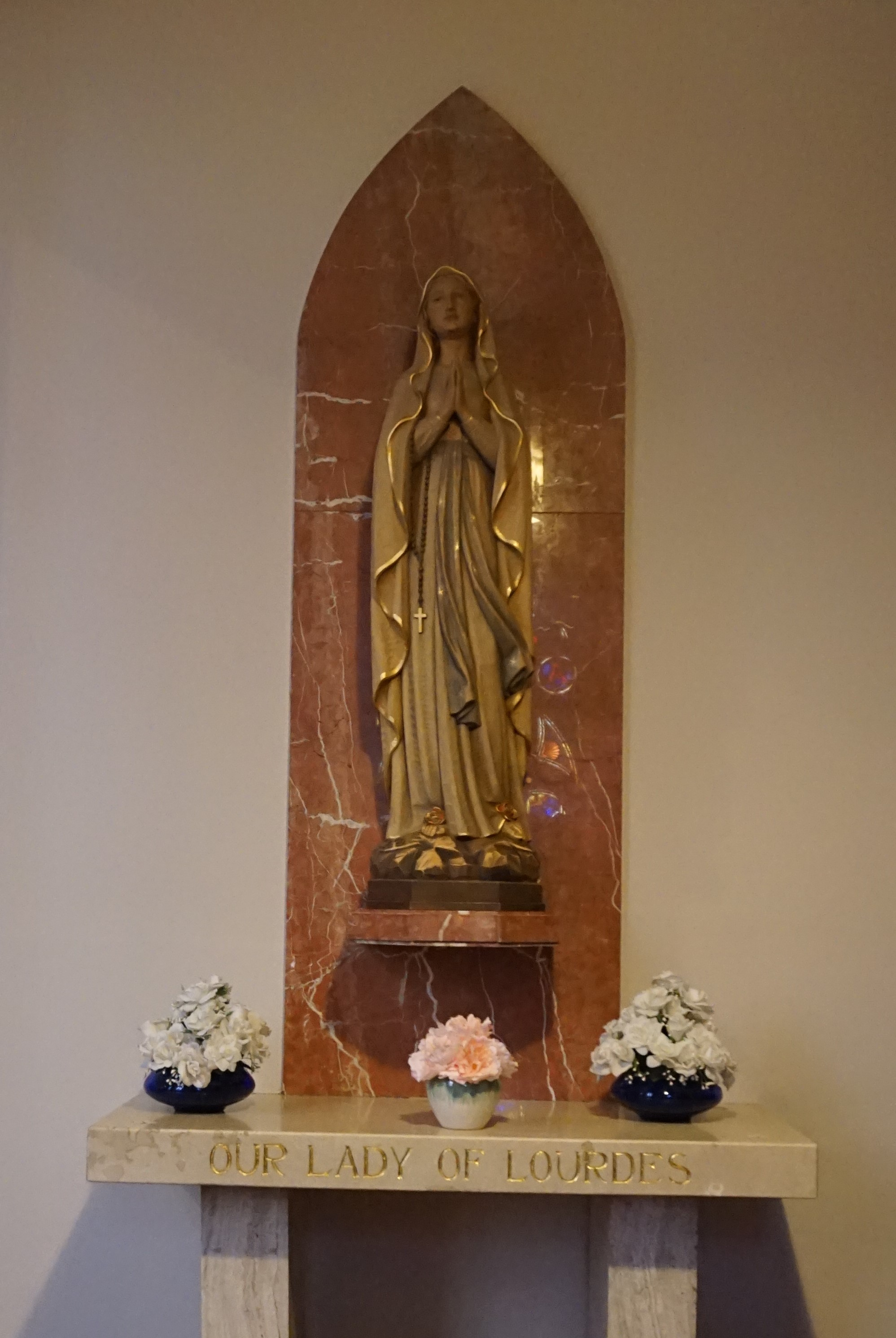
Lourdes Shrine

=== Our Lady of the Rosary ===
To the right of the grand altar is a smaller altar depicting the Blessed Mother giving the rosary to St. Dominic. The spread of the Rosary, a Marian devotion, is attributed to the preaching of Saint Dominic.

=== St. Joseph ===
To the left of the grand altar is a smaller altar with a statue of St. Joseph, spouse of the Virgin Mary, and protector of the child Jesus.

=== Lourdes Shrine ===
A plaque attests that the "New" Lourdes Shrine was erected in memory of Rev. Charles H. McKenna, O.P..

== Relics ==
The church hosts a number of relics, including

- A relic of the True Cross
- A relic of St. Jude Thaddeus
- A relic of the manger
- a relic of St. Martin de Porres

In the altar, there are also relics:

- Saint Dominic
- Saint Elizabeth Ann Seton

== Gallery ==
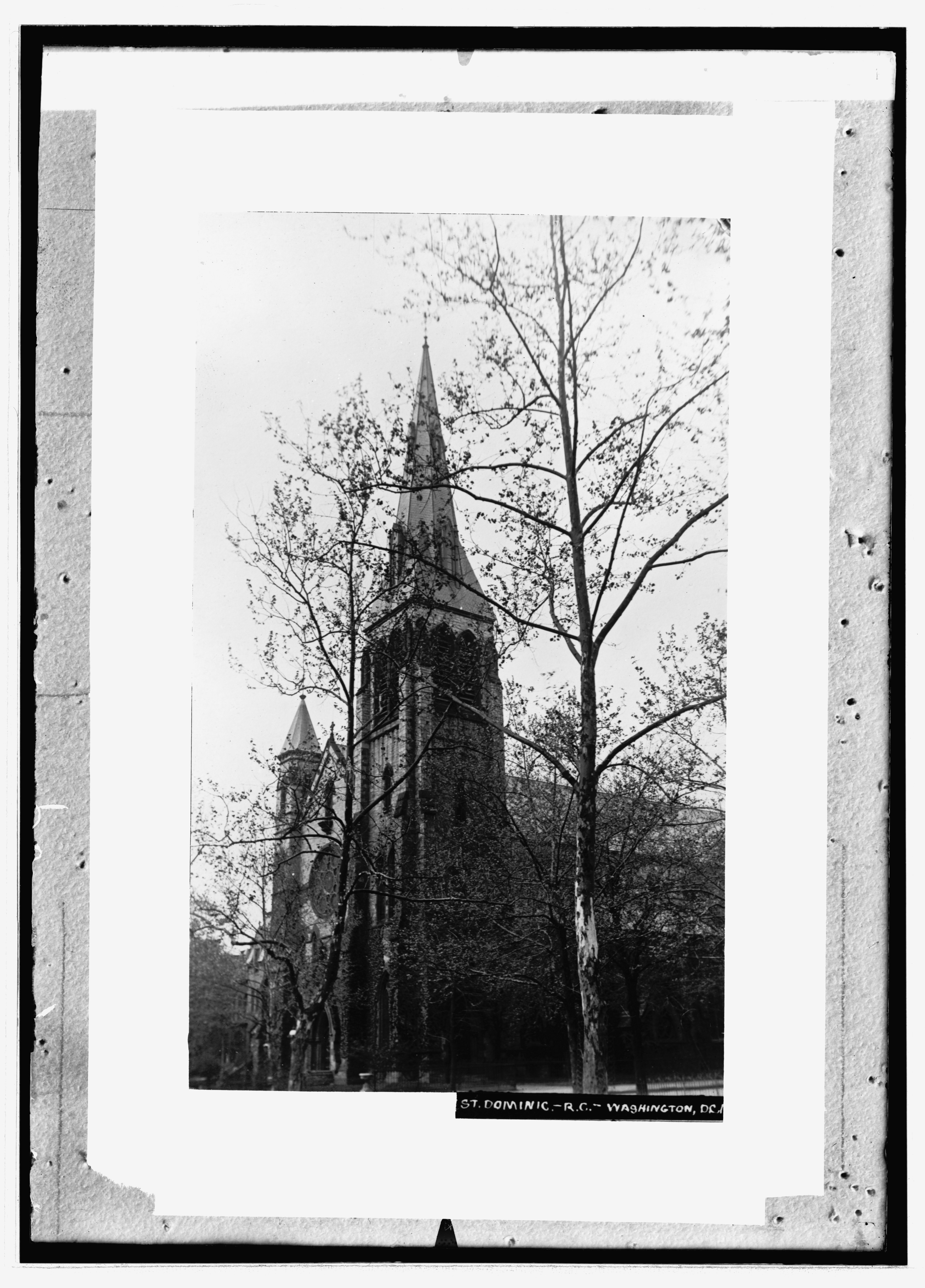
A view of St. Dominic Church from between 1909 and 1919.

St. Cecilia Rose Window. St. Cecilia is honored as a patroness of the Dominican Order.

Left: Blessed Reginald Receiving Scapular. Right: St. Raymund of Peñafort.

Upper left: St. Dominic meets St. Francis. Upper right: St. Dominic Refuses Episcopate. Bottom left: Blessed Benedict XI. Bottom right: St. Pius V.

Grand altar window of Mary, the Blessed Mother, patroness of the Dominican Order. It was a gift of Arsenius Harvey.

Central grand altar window portrayal of the Sacred Heart of Christ, the incarnate manifestation of God's love for his people as revealed in the life, death, and resurrection of his Son. This was a gift of George Mattingly.

Image of a chapel window. The window depicts the Lumen Ecclesiae, meaning Light of the Church, which is a name given to St. Dominic.

Upper left: St. Dominic offers himself as ransom to secure the freedom of a man held in slavery by the Moors in Palencia. Upper right: St. Dominic sells his books to help alleviate the suffering from famine in Palencia. Bottom left: St. Martin de Porres, known as the Apostle of Charity, from Lima, Peru. Bottom right: St. Margaret of Hungary of the Second Order Dominicans.

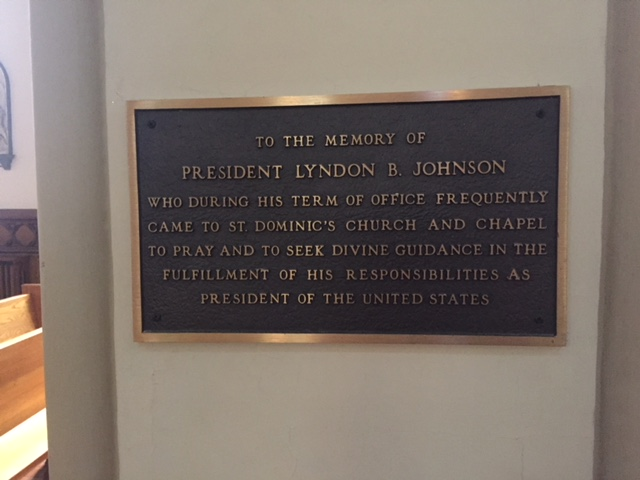
Plaque honoring Lyndon B. Johnson.
