= Müller & Abel =

Müller & Abel was an American firm founded in New York City which was notable in the field of building pipe organs. It operated from 1893 to 1902.

== History ==
Oscar Müller and George Abel were German immigrants who had been employed by Roosevelt Organ Works, a firm founded by the brothers Frank and Hilborne Roosevelt, which was the preeminent pipe organ building company in the country from 1870 through 1893. When the Roosevelt firm ceased operations, Müller and Abel established their own factory in New York City, which was in operation until 1902. In that time the pair become noted in their field, building sixty-two organs in various churches in the city and the surrounding region, some of which are still in use.

== Partial list of works ==
- St. Luke Evangelical Lutheran Church, Brooklyn, New York (1895)
- St. Joseph's Church, Yorkville (Manhattan) (1895)
- Sixty-eighth Street German Evangelical Reformed Church, Manhattan, New York (1897)
- Church of the Ascension, Roman Catholic (Manhattan) (1898)
- Saint Mary's Church of the Immaculate Conception, Wilkes-Barre, Pennsylvania (1902)
- German Zion Evangelical Lutheran Church, Brooklyn Heights, New York (1901) OHS Citation 112
