= Corpus Christi Church (New York City) =

Catholic church in Manhattan, New York

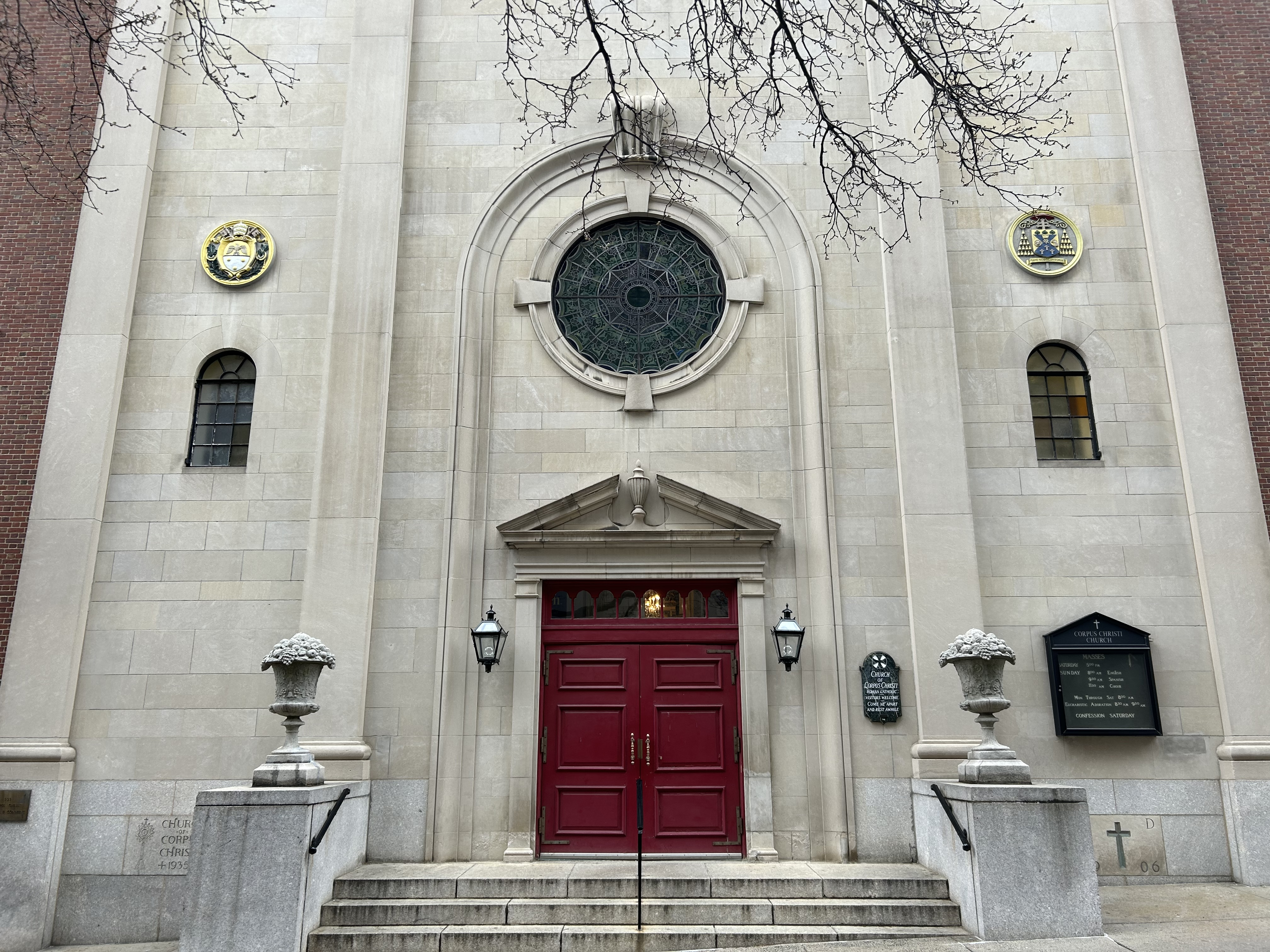
- A view of the church in March 2023

- 40°48′40.01″N 73°57′38.78″W
- Location: 533–535 West 121st Street, New York City, NY 10027
- Country: United States
- Denomination: Roman Catholic
- Website: corpus-christi-nyc.org

History
- Founded: May 1906 (parish)

Architecture
- Architect(s): F. A. de Meuron (1906 church); Thomas Dunn and Frederick E. Gibson (1930 church& rectory); Wilfred E. Anthony (1935 church)
- Architectural type: English Baroque; Baroque Revival
- Groundbreaking: 1906
- Completed: 1907; 1930; 1935
- Construction cost: $45,000 (1906)

Administration
- Archdiocese: Roman Catholic Archdiocese of New York

Clergy
- Pastor: Rev. Peter Heasley

The Church of Corpus Christi is a Catholic parish church in the Archdiocese of New York, located on West 121st Street between Broadway and Amsterdam Avenue in the Morningside Heights neighborhood of Manhattan in New York City. The parish was established in 1906. In 2022, the parish merged with the nearby Church of Notre Dame.

== Buildings ==
The church, founded by Rev. John H. Dooley, was built in 1906–1907 as a brick and stone chapel and three-story parish house, all over the basement, to designs of F. A. de Meuron of Main Street, Yonkers, New York, for $45,000. The structure was a five-bay three-storey Beaux-arts brick school house with a stone-quoined breakfront occupying the central three bays that contained a temporary church and rectory. The new church, school, and rectory cornerstone was laid on November 11, 1906, and the structure was dedicated on June 30, 1907 by Archbishop John Farley.

These buildings were replaced in 1930 with a new church and rectory built 1930 to the designs by Thomas Dunn and Frederick E. Gibson. The current church, school, and convent were dedicated on October 25, 1936. The church was designed in 1935 by Wilfred E. Anthony. The current baptistery survives from F. A. de Meuron's original 1906 church.

Although the classical exterior of the church is not prepossessing, the interior is widely admired. Time Out New York calls it "gorgeous," while the AIA Guide to NYC urges passersby to enter and admire a sanctuary that looks as though it was designed by a disciple of Sir Christopher Wren.

== Parish school ==
The parish school opened in September 1907, staffed by the Sisters of Charity of New York. The Dominican Sisters of Sinsinawa, Wisconsin, were welcomed to the school in 1936.

Corpus Christi School was closed in 2020 by the Archdiocese of New York citing the dangers of the COVID pandemic and very low school enrollment.

== Notable events ==
On November 16, 1938, Thomas Merton was baptized at Corpus Christi Church and received Holy Communion.
