= F. A. de Meuron =

American architect

- Known for: Architect

F. A. de Meuron, AIA, was an American architect practicing in Yonkers, New York and later New York City in the late nineteenth and early twentieth century. His main client was the Roman Catholic Archdiocese of New York for which he designed a number of ecclesiastical structures. He is best known as the designs of the Church of Corpus Christi. His office was located on Main Street, Yonkers, New York in the 1900s and at 31 East 27th Street, New York City in the 1910s.

== Works ==
- 1906: Church of Corpus Christi, and three-storey parish house for $45,000
- 1911: Ascension Church Parochial School, for $120,000
