= Church of the Ascension, Roman Catholic (Manhattan) =

Church in Manhattan, New York

Coordinates: 40°48′6″N 73°57′59″W

Church of the Ascension
- Ascension Church
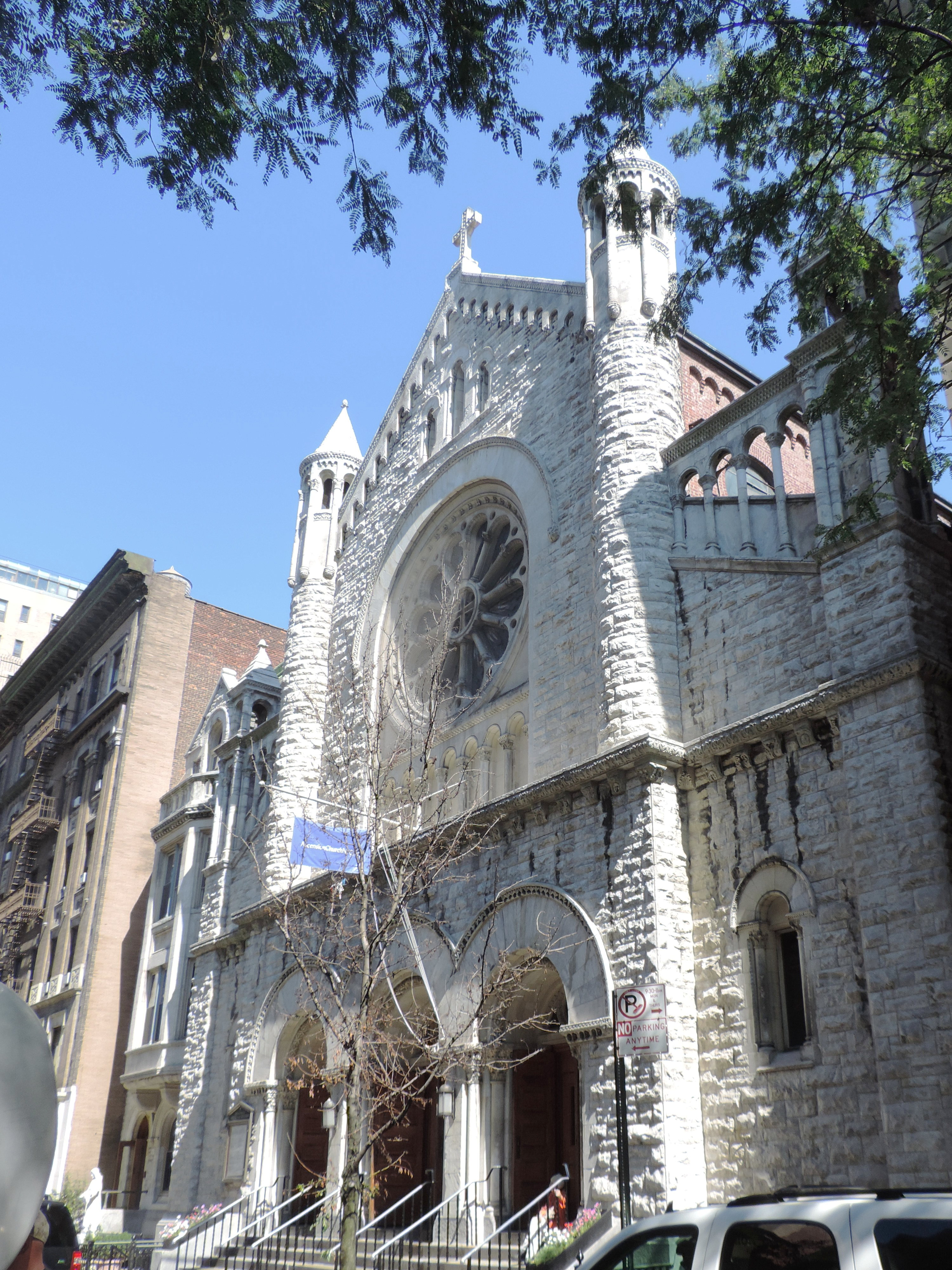
- Church of the Ascension
- Location: 221 West 107th St. Manhattan (New York City), New York
- Country: USA
- Denomination: Catholic Church
- Sui iuris church: Latin Church
- Website: ascensionchurchnyc.org

History
- Status: Parish church

Architecture
- Functional status: Active
- Architect: Schickel & Ditmars
- Architectural type: Church
- Style: Sicilian Romanesque of the Norman and Byzantine hybrid style
- Years built: 1896–7
- Completed: 1897

Administration
- Province: Metropolitan Province of New York
- Archdiocese: New York

Clergy
- Pastor: Rev. Dan Kearney

Ascension School
- Interactive map of the Ascension School area

General information
- Location: Manhattan, NYC, USA
- Construction started: school: 1911 dwelling house: 1927
- Cost: school: $120,000 dwelling house: $100,000
- Client: Archdiocese of New York

Design and construction
- Architects: parish school: F. A. de Meuron dwelling house: Robert J. Reilly

The Church of the Ascension is a Catholic parish church in the Archdiocese of New York, located at 221 West 107th Street in the Manhattan Valley section of the Upper West Side of Manhattan, New York City. The parish was established in 1895.

== Buildings ==
The elaborate midblock church, located on 107th Street between Amsterdam Avenue and Broadway, has an attached parish house, both designed in the Sicilian Romanesque of the Norman and Byzantine hybrid style and built between 1896 and 1897 to the designs by the German American church building designer Schickel & Ditmars. The parish has a four-story brick and stone parochial school built by P. J. Brennan & Son, builders, in 1911 to designs by architect F. A. de Meuron of 31 East 27th Street for $120,000. A five-story brick dwelling house was erected at 218 West 108th Street in 1927 to the designs by architect Robert J. Reilly of 12 E 41st Street for $100,000. The church was renovated in 1939.

== Organ ==
The Müller & Abel organ and organ case was built in 1898. Around 1900, a used two-manual pipe organ was installed in the Lower Church. Specifications of this organ have not yet been located. During 1939 renovations of the lower church, a new two-manual pipe organ was installed in 1939 by the Aeolian-Skinner Organ Company, Inc. of Boston, Massachusetts, and replaced the Müller & Abel organ. "Sometime after 1970, the chapel was closed and the organ was removed."

== Notable events ==
The church has been the filming location for films and television shows, including Keeping the Faith (2000) and as "Trinity Church" in the "Book of Hours" episode from the first season of White Collar (2009).
