= Thomas Ewing =

American politician

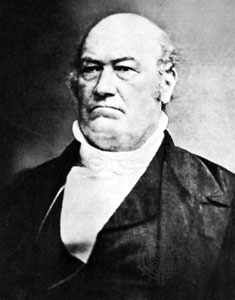

1st United States Secretary of the Interior
- In office March 8, 1849 – July 22, 1850
- President: Zachary Taylor; Millard Fillmore
- Preceded by: Position established
- Succeeded by: Thomas McKennan

14th United States Secretary of the Treasury
- In office March 4, 1841 – September 11, 1841
- President: William Henry Harrison; John Tyler
- Preceded by: Levi Woodbury
- Succeeded by: Walter Forward

United States Senator from Ohio
- In office July 20, 1850 – March 3, 1851
- Appointed by: Seabury Ford
- Preceded by: Thomas Corwin
- Succeeded by: Benjamin Wade
- In office March 4, 1831 – March 3, 1837
- Preceded by: Jacob Burnet
- Succeeded by: William Allen

Personal details
- Born: December 28, 1789 West Liberty, Virginia, U.S. (now West Virginia)
- Died: October 26, 1871 (aged 81) Lancaster, Ohio, U.S.
- Party: National Republican (Before 1833); Whig (1833–1871)
- Spouse: Maria Wills Boyle
- Education: Ohio University (BA)
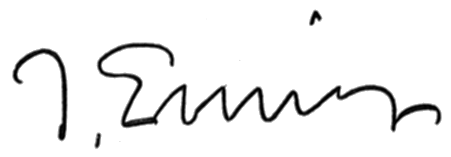
- Signature

Thomas Ewing Sr. (December 28, 1789 – October 26, 1871) was a National Republican and Whig politician from Ohio. He served in the U.S. Senate and also served as the fourteenth secretary of the treasury and the first secretary of the interior. He is also known as the foster father (and subsequently father-in-law) of famous American Civil War general William Tecumseh Sherman.

== Biography ==
Born in West Liberty, Ohio County, Virginia (now West Virginia), he was the son of American Revolutionary War veteran George Ewing. After studying at Ohio University and reading law under Philemon Beecher, Ewing began practicing law in Lancaster, Ohio, in 1816. In 1824, he was joined in that practice by Henry Stanbery.

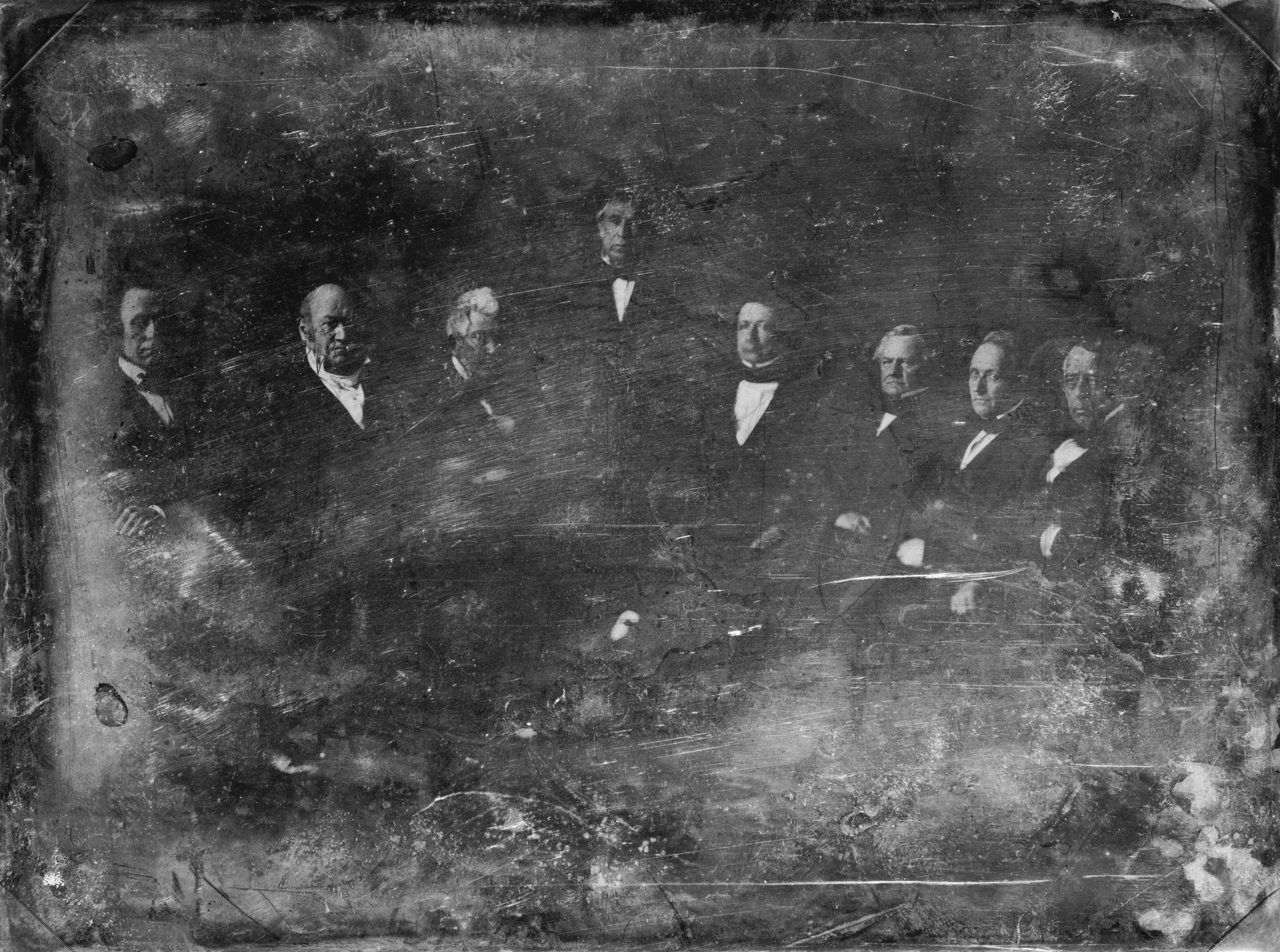
The Zachary Taylor Administration, 1849 Daguerreotype by Mathew Brady From left to right: William B. Preston, Thomas Ewing, John M. Clayton, Zachary Taylor, William M. Meredith, George W. Crawford, Jacob Collamer and Reverdy Johnson, (1849).

As a colorful country lawyer, he was elected to the U.S. Senate in 1830 as a Whig and served a single term. He was unsuccessful in seeking a second term in 1836. Ewing served as Secretary of the Treasury in 1841, serving under Presidents William Henry Harrison and John Tyler. He resigned on September 11, 1841, along with the entire cabinet (except Secretary of State Daniel Webster), in protest of Tyler's veto of the Banking Act.

Ewing was later appointed to serve as the first Secretary of the Interior by President Zachary Taylor. Ewing served in the position from March 8, 1849, to July 22, 1850, under Taylor and Millard Fillmore. As James G. Blaine later wrote:

Thomas Ewing of Ohio, selected to organize the Department of the Interior, just then authorized by law, was a man of intellectual power, a lawyer of the first rank, possessing a stainless character, great moral courage, unbending will, an incisive style, both with tongue and pen, and a breadth of reading and wealth of information never surpassed by any public man in America.

As first secretary, Ewing consolidated bureaus from various Departments, such as the Land Office from the Treasury Department and the Indian Bureau from the War Department. The bureaus were being kicked out of their offices as unwanted tenants in their former departments. However, the Interior Department had no office space, so Ewing rented space. Later, the Patent Office building, with a new east wing, provided permanent space in 1852. Ewing initiated the Interior Department's culture of corruption by wholesale replacement of officials with political patronage. Newspapers called him "Butcher Ewing" for his efforts.

In 1850, Ewing was appointed to the Senate to fill the vacancy created by the resignation of Thomas Corwin, and served from July 20, 1850 – March 3, 1851. Ewing was unsuccessful in seeking re-election in 1850. In 1861, Ewing served as one of Ohio's delegates to the peace conference held in Washington in hopes of staving off civil war. Ewing was a defender of slavery at this conference, and frequently deflected attacks on the institution by Britain, stating that 'we have no slavery or misery to be compared with that existing in the India provinces.' After the war, Ewing was appointed by President Andrew Johnson to a third cabinet post as Secretary of War in 1868 following the firing of Edwin M. Stanton but the Senate, still outraged at Johnson's firing of Stanton – which had provoked Johnson's impeachment – refused to act on the nomination.

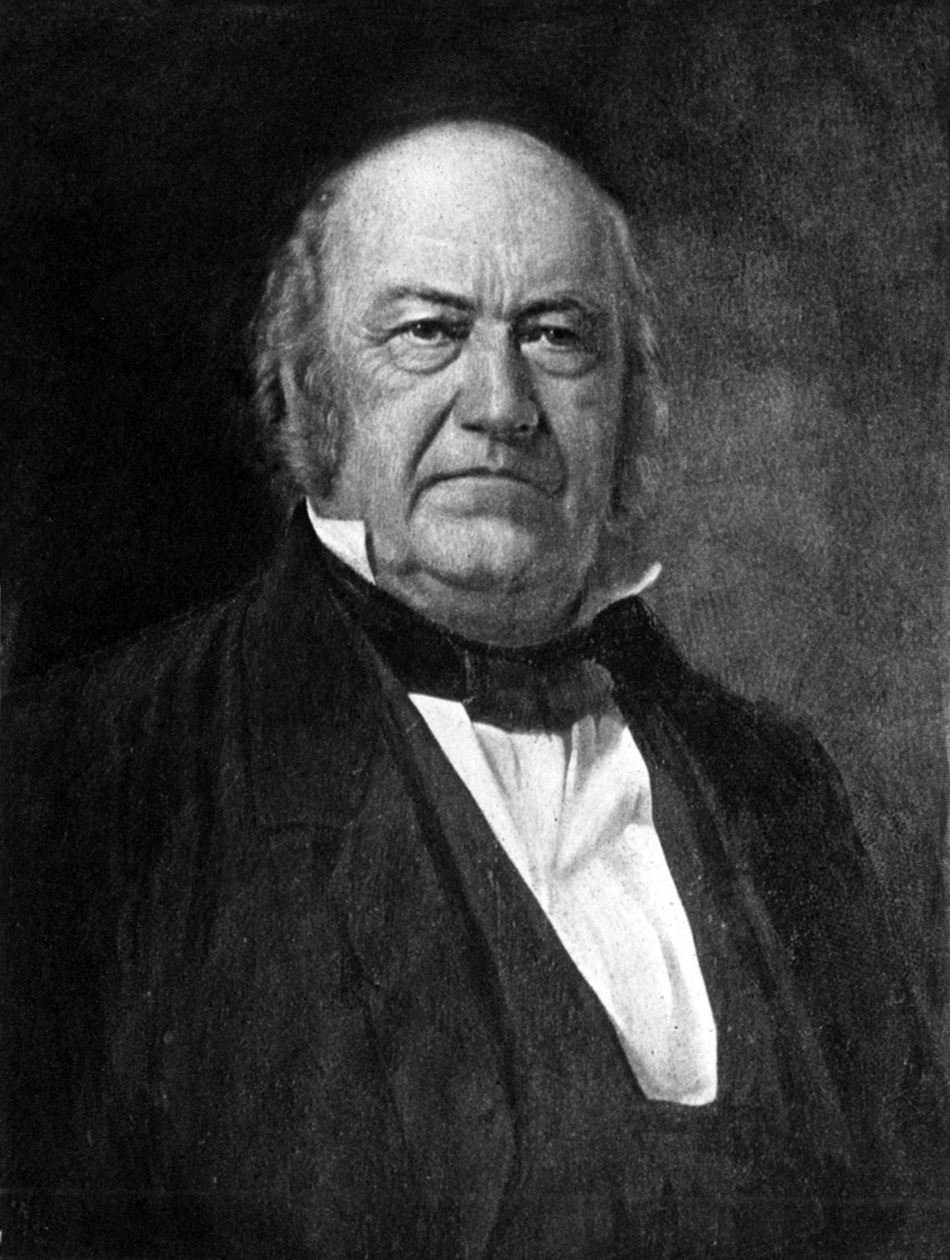
Ewing in 1856

Ewing married Maria Wills Boyle, a Roman Catholic, and raised their children in her faith. His foster son was the famous general William Tecumseh Sherman. Sherman eventually married Thomas Ewing Sr.'s daughter, Ellen Ewing Sherman. Ewing's namesake son, Thomas Ewing Jr., was an American Civil War Union army general and two-term U.S. Congressman from Ohio. Two of Ewing's other sons – Hugh Boyle Ewing and Charles Ewing – also became generals in the Union army during the Civil War. Through Ellen and Sherman, Ewing also had a namesake grandson, Thomas Ewing Sherman.

Ewing was born a Presbyterian, but for many years attended Catholic services with his family. He was formally baptized into the Catholic faith during his last illness.

Ewing remained a Whig following his joining of the party in 1833, even when the national Whig Party collapsed and was replaced by the Republican Party. This makes Ewing one of the only federal politicians to remain a member the Whig Party when many others bolted to the Republican or American parties.

Prior to his death on October 26, 1871, Ewing had been the last surviving member of the Harrison and Tyler Cabinets. Future President and Governor of Ohio Rutherford B. Hayes was a pallbearer at his funeral. He is buried in Saint Mary Cemetery, Lancaster, Fairfield County, Ohio.

== See also ==
- Unsuccessful nominations to the Cabinet of the United States

U.S. Senate
Preceded by Jacob Burnet	United States Senator (Class 3) from Ohio; 1831–1837; Served alongside: Benjamin Ruggles, Thomas Morris	Succeeded by William Allen
Preceded by George Poindexter	Chair of the Senate Public Lands Committee; 1835–1836	Succeeded by Robert J. Walker
Preceded by Thomas Corwin	United States Senator (Class 1) from Ohio; 1850–1851; Served alongside: Salmon P. Chase	Succeeded by Benjamin Wade
Political offices
Preceded by Levi Woodbury	United States Secretary of the Treasury; 1841	Succeeded by Walter Forward
New office	United States Secretary of the Interior; 1849–1850	Succeeded by Thomas McKennan
