= St. Joseph Church (Yorkville, Manhattan) =

Coordinates: 40.777226°N 73.948545°W

Church of St. Joseph, Yorkville
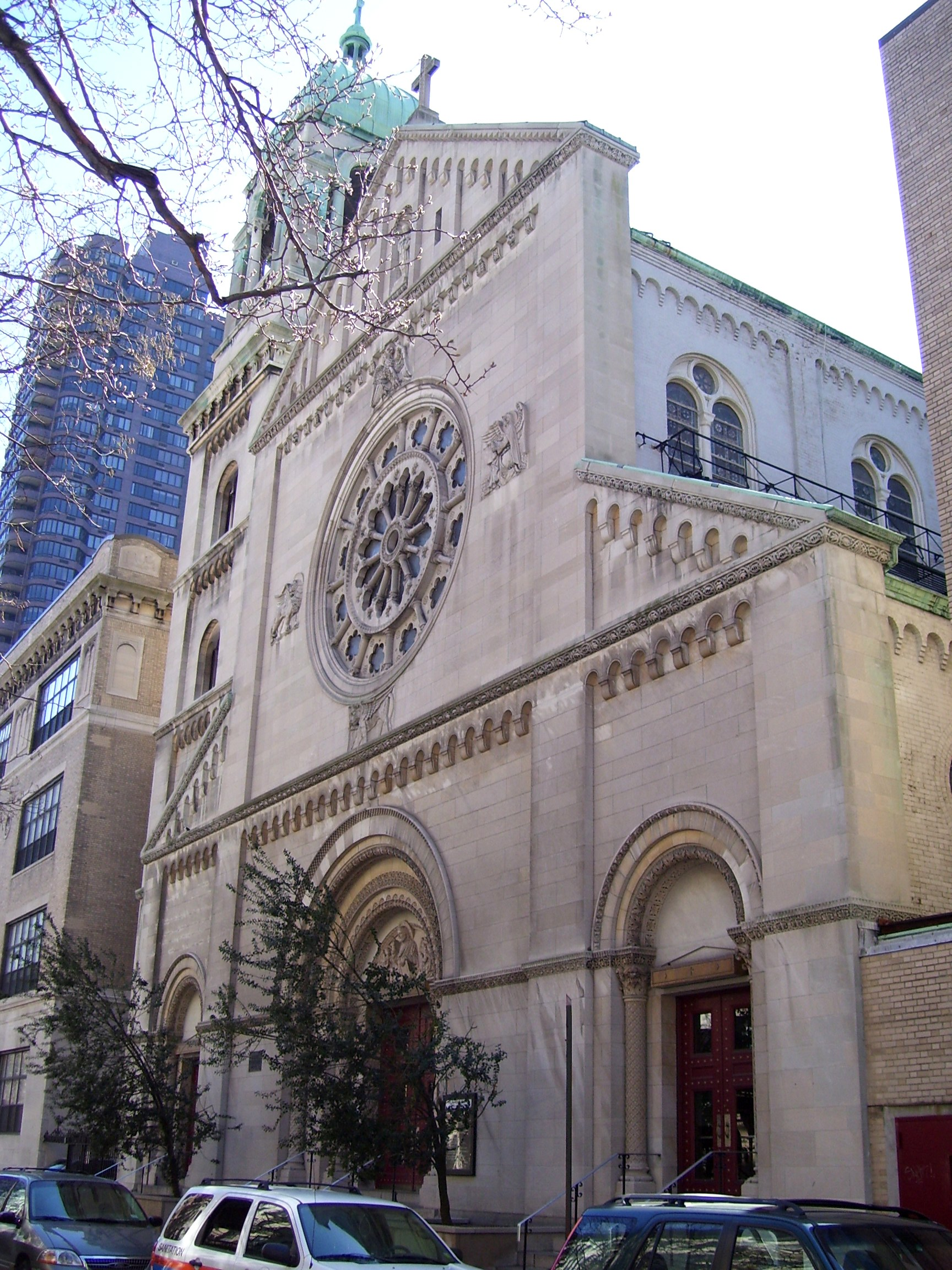
- Church of St. Joseph, Yorkville
- Location: 404 East 87 Street, New York, New York 10128
- Country: United States
- Denomination: Roman Catholic
- Website: www.stjosephsyorkville.org

History
- Founded: 1873
- Dedication: Saint Joseph
- Dedicated: 1874 (first church), 1895

Architecture
- Functional status: active
- Architect: J. William Schickel
- Architectural type: Church
- Style: Romanesque Revival
- Groundbreaking: 1874 (first church), 1894
- Completed: 1874 (first church), 1895

Administration
- Archdiocese: New York
- Parish: St. Joseph Parish

Clergy
- Archbishop: Cardinal Timothy M. Dolan
- Pastor: Rev. Gerald Murray

The Church of St. Joseph is the Catholic parish church for St. Joseph Parish, a national parish in New York City founded in 1873 to serve the German-speaking residents of the Yorkville neighborhood on the Upper East Side of Manhattan.

== History ==
Many German families sought more pleasant surroundings than were to be found in their original enclave of Little Germany on the city's Lower East Side and found it in Yorkville. In 1857, the German Redemptorists, who served the Church of the Most Holy Redeemer, purchased the estate of broker and banker Nathaniel Prime. (His daughter Emily was married to William Seton, son of Elizabeth Ann Seton.) The Redemptorists opened St. Joseph's Orphan Asylum at Avenue A and East 89th Street to provide the children more open and green space.

At that time, the only Catholic church in the area was the Church of St. Laurence O'Toole, which was run by the Jesuit Fathers on what was to become Park Avenue. The German Catholics who moved into the area relied for church services in their native tongue on a chapel at the orphanage.

In 1873 a delegation of the German Catholic community in Yorkville approached Thomas Ouellet, S.J., the rector of St. Laurence Parish, who by church law was their official pastor, and requested that the Jesuits provide a German-speaking priest for a new parish be established to serve their needs. They agreed and referred this request to John McCloskey, the archbishop of New York, who authorized the establishment of the Parish of St. Joseph. The Jesuits were initially entrusted with its administration and Joseph Durthaller, S.J., was sent to serve as its first pastor. A small church was quickly built and dedicated by McCloskey in 1874.

In December 1880, Redemptorist Father Joseph Helmpraecht organized a school at the orphanage that also served the children of the parish. St. Joseph School was staffed by the School Sisters of Notre Dame, based in Bavaria, who taught their students entirely in German. The school day began at 8:00 A.M., with students in fourth through eighth grades attending daily Mass, where they sang Gregorian chant.

As the Jesuits were needed to staff their colleges, in 1888 the Archdiocese of New York took over administration of the parish. Monsignor Anton Lammel was assigned as pastor. Lammel was born in Germany, ordained in 1873, and had served as assistant at St. Nicholas Kirche.

Lammel soon felt that the current church was no longer adequate to the needs of his growing congregation and started to plan for a new church. Construction on the new Romanesque Revival church began in 1894 under the architect J. William Schickel and was completed the following year. The new church was dedicated by Archbishop Corrigan on November 3, 1895. It boasted of an organ made by the noted firm of Müller & Abel, which is still in use. The church also has a harpsichord.

Lammel served as pastor until 1911, when he was succeeded by Monsignor Gallus Bruder (1911–1943). Bruder had been pastor for many years at the German Church of the Nativity in Poughkeepsie. Among various other improvements which Galler made to the parish facilities was the building of a parochial school to accommodate the large expansion of the German population moving into the neighborhood after the General Slocum disaster of 1904. The new school was designed in Romanesque style by parishioner and alumnus Frank Burkhard. It was completed in 1926. School dances were held in the auditorium. The church's bell tower was also completed in 1926.

== Current ==
The German community for which Yorkville was long known began to disperse in the 1970s; however, Mass in German continues to be celebrated at the church monthly. The parish currently numbers some 700 parishioners. Additionally, with the closing in August 2015 of the nearby Church of St. Stephen of Hungary, which had served the Hungarian population of the city, services in the Hungarian language began to be celebrated at St. Joseph's Church on September 6 of that year.

At the front of the main aisle, just before the sanctuary, there is a floor mosaic depicting the personal crest of Pope Benedict XVI, who visited St. Joseph's on April 18, 2008, and donated a chalice and paten to the church.

In June 2023, the Cub Scouts scheduled their Big Apple Pinewood Derby at St. Joseph's.

St. Joseph’s School has served German, Irish, Italian, and more recently Hispanic, African-American, and Asian children; it has an enrollment of about 350 students.

In 1918 St. Joseph's Orphanage relocated to Peekskill and the property was sold. It subsequently became a parking garage, and later a condominium. In 2018, excavation for a new sports facility for Spence School uncovered the 1898 facade of the neo-classical brick and limestone hall designed by A.F.A. Schmitt which housed the chapel. The facade "...boasts exquisite ornamentation, detailed pediments, a circular rose window, decorative keystones that crown arched window openings and large Romanesque arches that once provided entry for prayer services." Spence School indicated that "[t]he new Spence building at 412 East 90th St. will abut the brick-and-stone wall, but all primary structure is set back from the protruding elements of the remnant wall...When the new building is finished, the masonry wall will not be visible."
