= Catholic Indian Missionary Association =

Catholic fundraising organization

The Catholic Indian Missionary Association was a Roman Catholic fund-raising organization that supported Catholic schools and mission work among American Indians in the United States.

== History ==
In 1875, Catholic lay women organized the association in Washington, D.C., and other major U.S. cities, with Jean-Baptiste Brouillet as its director and treasurer and Ellen Ewing Sherman as its principal organizer and fundraiser. It raised $48,700 in donations and bequests for the Catholic Indian Mission Fund, which supported the Bureau of Catholic Indian Missions and Catholic missions and schools on Indian reservations. The chapters in St. Louis, Missouri and Philadelphia, Pennsylvania raised the bulk of its funds and $6,000 was the most raised in any one year. The association ceased in 1887, when the Catholic Bureau experienced success in acquiring government contracts for the Catholic schools from the Office of Indian Affairs.

== See also ==
- Marquette University Special Collections and University Archives
