= Saint Martin de Porres (sculpture) =

Sculpture by Thomas McGlynn

- Artist: Fr. Thomas McGlynn
- Year: 1963

Saint Martin de Porres is a sculpture of St Martin de Porres by American artist and Catholic priest Fr Thomas McGlynn, OP. It is one of McGlynn's most well known works and is said to have contributed to the canonization of the saint in 1962.

== Description ==
The sculpture is a standing figure of Saint Martin de Porres wearing a cassock with a belt at the waist, he wears shoes. His head looks downwards, eyes somewhat closed, as if in deep thought or prayer. In his proper right hand he holds a cross to his chest and his proper left hand grips his leg with a broom under his arm. Some of the works of this piece feature the Saint looking down at rats that have gathered at his feet, often featuring 2–3 rats.

== Sculptor ==
McGlynn was born May 23, 1906, to Frank McGlynn and Rose O'Beirne. On September 8, 1925, he received the habit of the Dominican Order, taking the name Brother Matthew. At Dominic's Church in Washington, D.C., he was ordained a priest on May 20, 1932, by Archbishop Michael Joseph Curley. Receiving his degree in sculpture in Rome, Italy in 1934 and returned to the United States to study at Cranbrook Educational Community studying under Carl Milles. After apostolic ministry and serving as faculty member at Providence College (1937–1938 and 1946), he went to Pietrasanta, Italy in 1956 commissioned to create a sculpture of Our Lady of Fatima and he remained in the country until his death on September 3, 1977.

Growing up, McGlynn was unaware of racial issues during his youth, using discriminatory terms as part of everyday life to describe African Americans. Upon entering the priesthood McGlynn states that "My meeting with Martin de Porres changed all that."

== Locations ==
Four versions of the sculpture exist, and the creation of this work is often credited with contributing to the canonization of de Porres in 1962.

=== Dominican House of Studies ===
The original plaster version of the sculpture resided in the collection of the Dominican House of Studies in Washington, D.C., as of 1962.

==== Vatican ====
The first, small version of the sculpture was created for use at the Vatican, completed in 1962.

==== Providence College ====
Providence College has two copies of the sculpture, one in front of Martin Hall and a second at the McGlynn Sculpture Court, named after the sculptor. The Martin Hall sculpture, the fourth in the series, has no rats at the Saints feet, is made of bronze (H. 7 ft.) and was copyrighted in 1958 and dedicated on November 3, 1979. This version was originally designed for Saint Raymond's Cemetery in the Bronx, New York City, and McGlynn decided to remove the rats believing that people would have an aversion to them being on a sculpture in a cemetery. It was surveyed in 1993 by the Smithsonian's Save Outdoor Sculpture! program and was described as needing treatment.

The second sculpture, at McGlynn Sculpture Court, features several small rats at the Saints feet. This is an earlier version of the above piece, made also of bronze (H. 48 in. × W. 1 ft. 3 in.), created in 1962, cast in 1963 and dedicated on October 2, 1993. The sculpture stands in a small fountain. as part of the Sculpture Court which was built after the Dominican Province of St. Joseph donated their McGlynn Archives & Sculpture Collection to the College in 1980. This sculpture was described as well maintained by the Save Outdoor Sculpture! survey program.

=== Our Lady of Perpetual Help Church ===
The version of the sculpture at Our Lady of Perpetual Help Catholic Church in Washington, D.C., is made of wood (H. 12 1/2 ft.) and does not feature the rats at his feet. It was dedicated on May 27, 1989, with the support of the St. Martin de Porres Guild and the founding pastor who wanted the church to be dedicated in the Saints honor. The funds for the work were provided by an endowment supplied by parishioner Mary A. Cooke, who hoped to have the statue erected inside the church school. The piece resides outside. The work was described as needing treatment in 1994 by the Save Outdoor Sculpture! survey program.

==== Diocese of Raleigh ====
On November 3, 2009, the parish of St. Joseph in Raleigh, North Carolina, was presented a four-foot-tall version of the sculpture by Fr. Ambrose McAlister, Professor Emeritus of Art and Art History at Providence College, to celebrate the Feast of St. Martin de Porres. This black marble casting was made from the 1930 version and was created in a Rhode Island–based foundry. It sits upon a table of white carrara marble, which was crafted by parish member Bill Stephany. Fundraising for the work and installation was spearheaded by parish member Daisy Foster. Father McGlynn worked in Raleigh at St. Monica's from 1947 to 1954.

==== St. Martin de Porres National Shrine & Institute, Memphis, Tennessee ====
The national shrine to de Porres in Memphis has a chapel that features a small version of the 1930 casting which shares the space with a relic of St. Martin as well as a stained-glass window and icons created by Pam Hassler.
