= Frederick E. Gibson =

Deputy Judge of the Federal Court of Canada
- Incumbent
- Assumed office September 2, 2008

Personal details
- Born: May 27, 1935 (age 90) Ottawa, Ontario, Canada

Frederick E. Gibson (born May 27, 1935) is a judge who served on the Federal Court of Canada from 1993 to 2008.
