= Martin de Porres =

Catholic saint (1579–1639)

Saint Martin de Porres OP
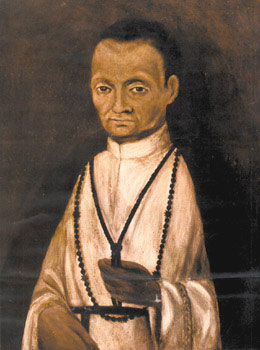
- Portrait of St. Martin de Porres, c. 17th century, Monastery of Rosa of Santa Maria in Lima. This portrait was painted during his lifetime or very soon after his death, hence it is probably the most true to his appearance.

Martin of Charity Saint of the Broom
- Born: 9 December 1579; Lima, Viceroyalty of Peru, Spanish Empire (modern-day Peru)
- Died: 3 November 1639 (aged 59); Lima, Viceroyalty of Peru, Spanish Empire
- Venerated in: Catholic Church, Lutheranism
- Beatified: 29 October 1837 by Pope Gregory XVI
- Canonized: 6 May 1962, by Pope John XXIII
- Major shrine: Basilica and Convent of Santo Domingo, Lima, Peru
- Feast: 3 November
- Attributes: a dog, a cat, a bird, and a mouse eating together from the same dish; broom, crucifix, rosary, a heart
- Patronage: Diocese of Biloxi, black people, hair stylists, innkeepers, lottery, lottery winners, mixed-race people, poor people, public education, public health, public schools, race relations, social justice, state schools, television, Peruvian Naval Aviators

Martín de Porras Velázquez OP (9 December 1579 – 3 November 1639) was a Peruvian, pharmacist, barber, nurse and lay brother of the Dominican Order. Born to a Spanish nobleman and formerly enslaved Black woman, he entered the Dominicans in 1603 and was known for his work on behalf of the poor, establishing an orphanage and a children's hospital. He also maintained an austere lifestyle, which included fasting and abstaining from meat.

Among the many miracles attributed to him were those of levitation, bilocation, miraculous knowledge, instantaneous cures, and an ability to communicate with animals. He was beatified in 1837 by Pope Gregory XVI and canonized in 1962 by Pope John XXIII. He is the patron saint of Black people, mixed-race people, barbers, innkeepers, public health workers, all those seeking racial harmony, and animals.

== Lifestyle ==
Martin was born in the city of Lima, Viceroyalty of Peru, Spanish Empire, on 9 December 1579. He was the illegitimate son of a Spanish nobleman, Don Juan de Porras y de la Peña, and Ana Velázquez, a freed slave of African and Native descent. He had a sister named Juana de Porres, born two years later in 1581. After the birth of his sister, the father abandoned the family. Ana Velázquez supported her children by taking in laundry. Martin grew up in poverty and, when his mother could not support him, he was sent to a primary school for two years, and then placed with a barber surgeon as an apprentice. He spent hours of the night in prayer, a practice that increased as he grew older.

Under Peruvian law, descendants of Africans and Native Americans were barred from becoming full members of religious orders. The only route open to Martin was to ask the Dominicans of Holy Rosary Priory in Lima to accept him as a "donado", a volunteer who performed menial tasks in the monastery in return for the privilege of wearing the habit and living with the religious community. At the age of 15, he asked for admission to the Dominican Convent of the Rosary in Lima and was received first as a servant boy, and as his duties grew he was promoted to almoner.

Martin continued to practice his old trades of barbering and healing and was said to have performed many miraculous cures. He also took on kitchen work, laundry, and cleaning. After eight years at Holy Rosary, the prior Juan de Lorenzana decided to turn a blind eye to the law and permit Martin to take his vows as a member of the Third Order of Saint Dominic. Holy Rosary was home to 300 men, not all of whom accepted the decision of De Lorenzana: one of the novices called Martin a "mulatto dog", while one of the priests mocked him for being illegitimate and descended from slaves.

When Martin was 24, he was allowed to profess religious vows as a Dominican lay brother in 1603. He is said to have several times refused this elevation in status, which may have come about due to his father's intervention, and he never became a priest. It is said that when his convent was in debt, he implored them: "I am only a poor mulatto, sell me." Martin was deeply attached to the Blessed Sacrament, and he was praying in front of it one night when the step of the altar he was kneeling on caught fire. Throughout all the confusion and chaos that followed, he remained where he was, unaware of what was happening around him.

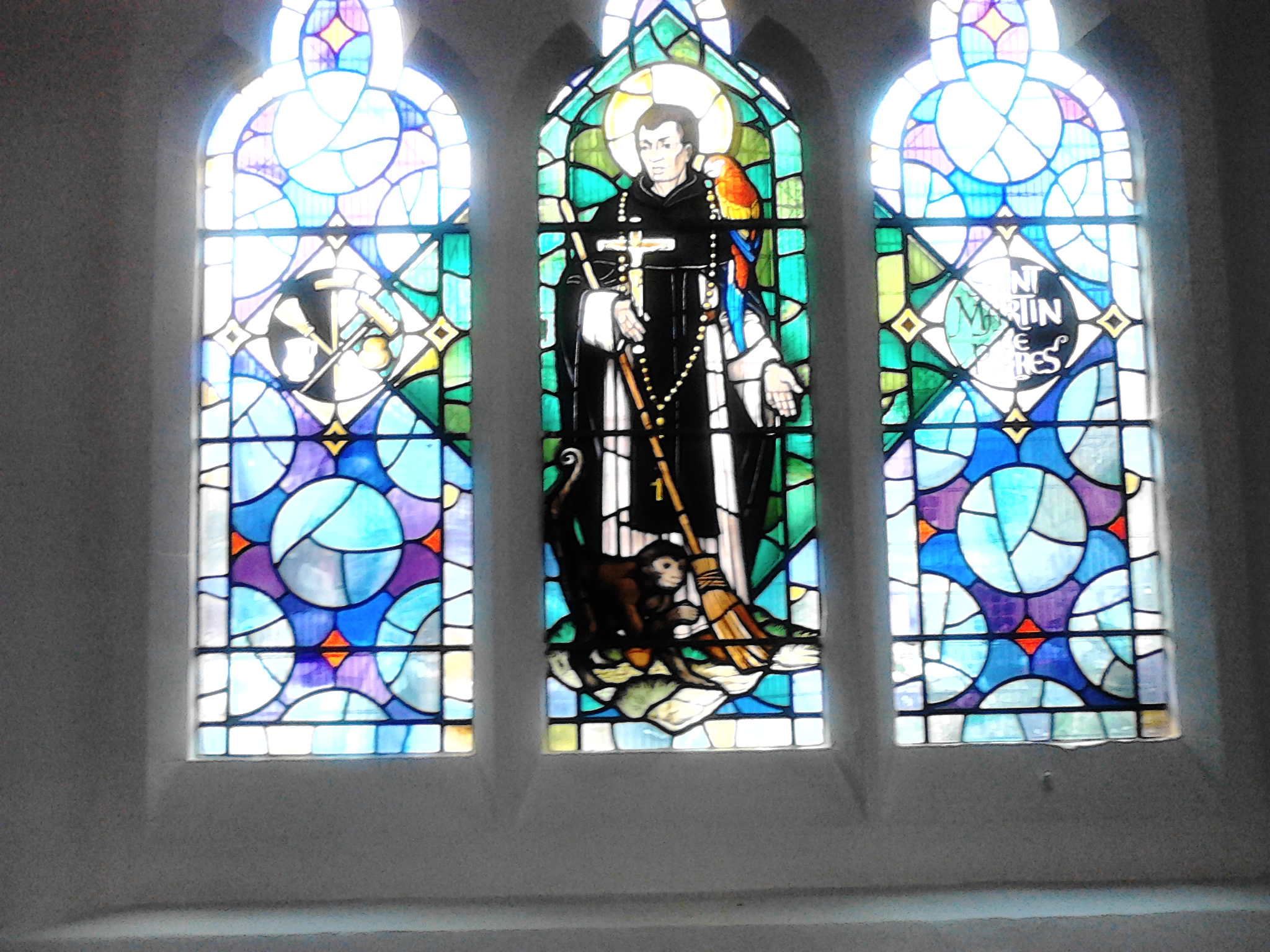
A mid-20th-century stained-glass representation of Martin de Porres in St Pancras Church, Ipswich, with a broom, rosary, parrot and monkey

When Martin was 34, after he had been given the religious habit of a lay brother, he was assigned to the infirmary, where he was placed in charge and would remain in service until his death at the age of 59. He was known for his care of the sick. His superiors saw in him the virtues necessary to exercise unfailing patience in this difficult role. It was not long before miracles were attributed to him. Martin also cared for the sick outside his convent, often bringing them healing with only a simple glass of water. He ministered without distinction to Spanish nobles and to slaves recently brought from Africa. One day an aged beggar, covered with ulcers and almost naked, stretched out his hand, and Martin let the man use his own bed. When one of his brethren reproved him, Martin replied: "Compassion, my dear Brother, is preferable to cleanliness."

When an epidemic struck Lima, there were in this single Convent of the Rosary 60 friars who were sick, many of them novices in a distant and locked section of the convent, separated from the professed. Martin is said to have passed through the locked doors to care for them, a phenomenon which was reported in the residence more than once. The professed, too, saw him suddenly beside them without the doors having been opened. Martin continued to transport the sick to the convent until the provincial superior, alarmed by the contagion threatening the friars, forbade him to continue to do so. His sister, who lived in the country, offered her house to lodge those whom the residence of the religious could not hold. One day he found on the street a poor Indian, bleeding to death from a dagger wound, and took him to his own room until he could transport him to his sister's hospice. The prior, when he heard of this, reprimanded him for disobedience. He was extremely edified, however, by his reply: "Forgive my error, and please instruct me, for I did not know that the precept of obedience took precedence over that of charity." The prior gave him liberty thereafter to follow his inspirations in the exercise of mercy.

Martin did not eat meat. He begged for alms to procure necessities the convent could not provide. In normal times, he succeeded with his alms in feeding 160 poor persons every day, and distributed a remarkable sum of money every week to the indigent. Side by side with his daily work in the kitchen, laundry and infirmary, Martin's life is said to have reflected extraordinary gifts: ecstasies that lifted him into the air, light filling the room where he prayed, bilocation, miraculous knowledge, instantaneous cures and a remarkable rapport with animals. He founded a residence for orphans and abandoned children in the city of Lima.

== Death and commemoration ==
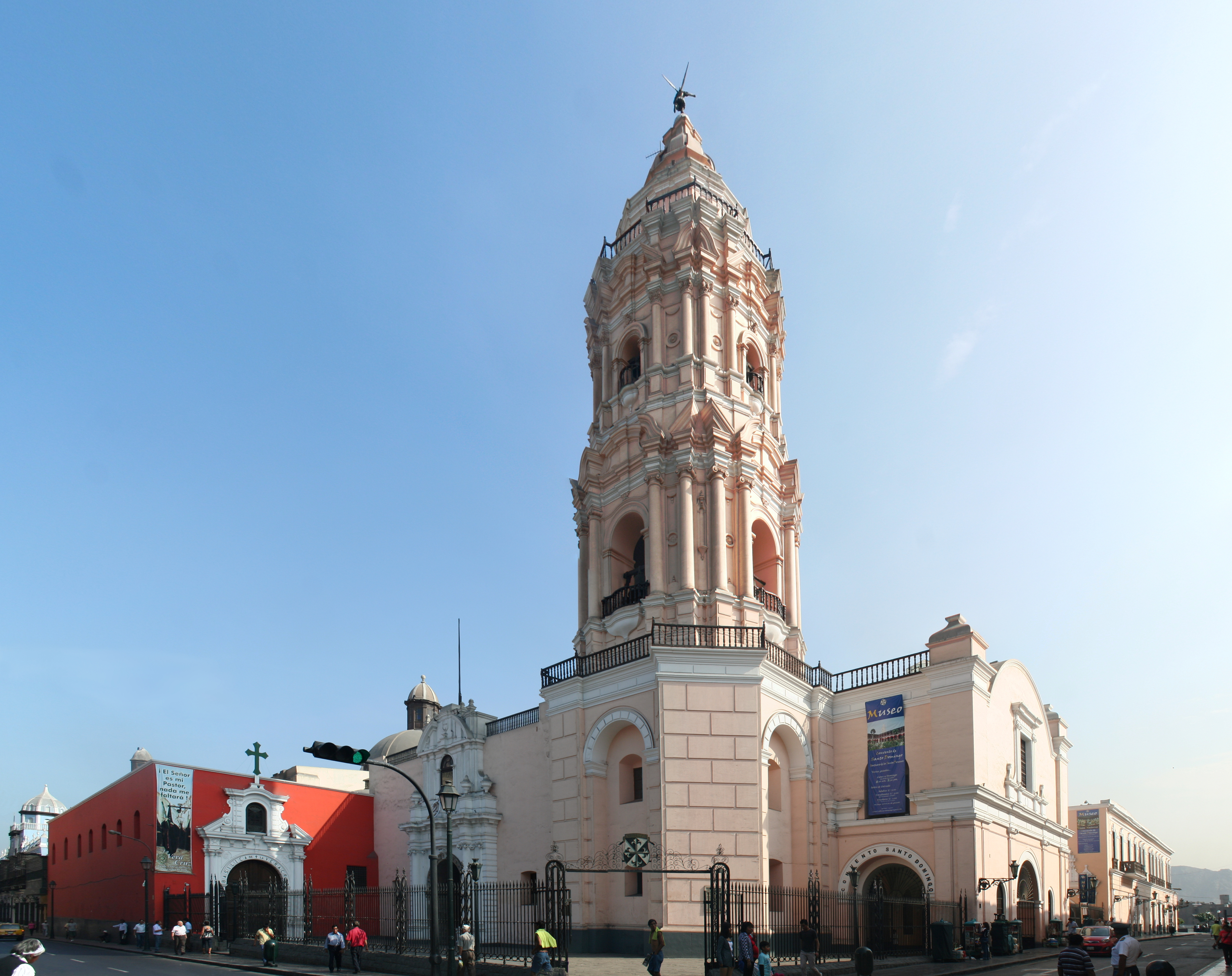
The Basilica and Convent of Santo Domingo, where de Porres is buried, in Lima, Peru

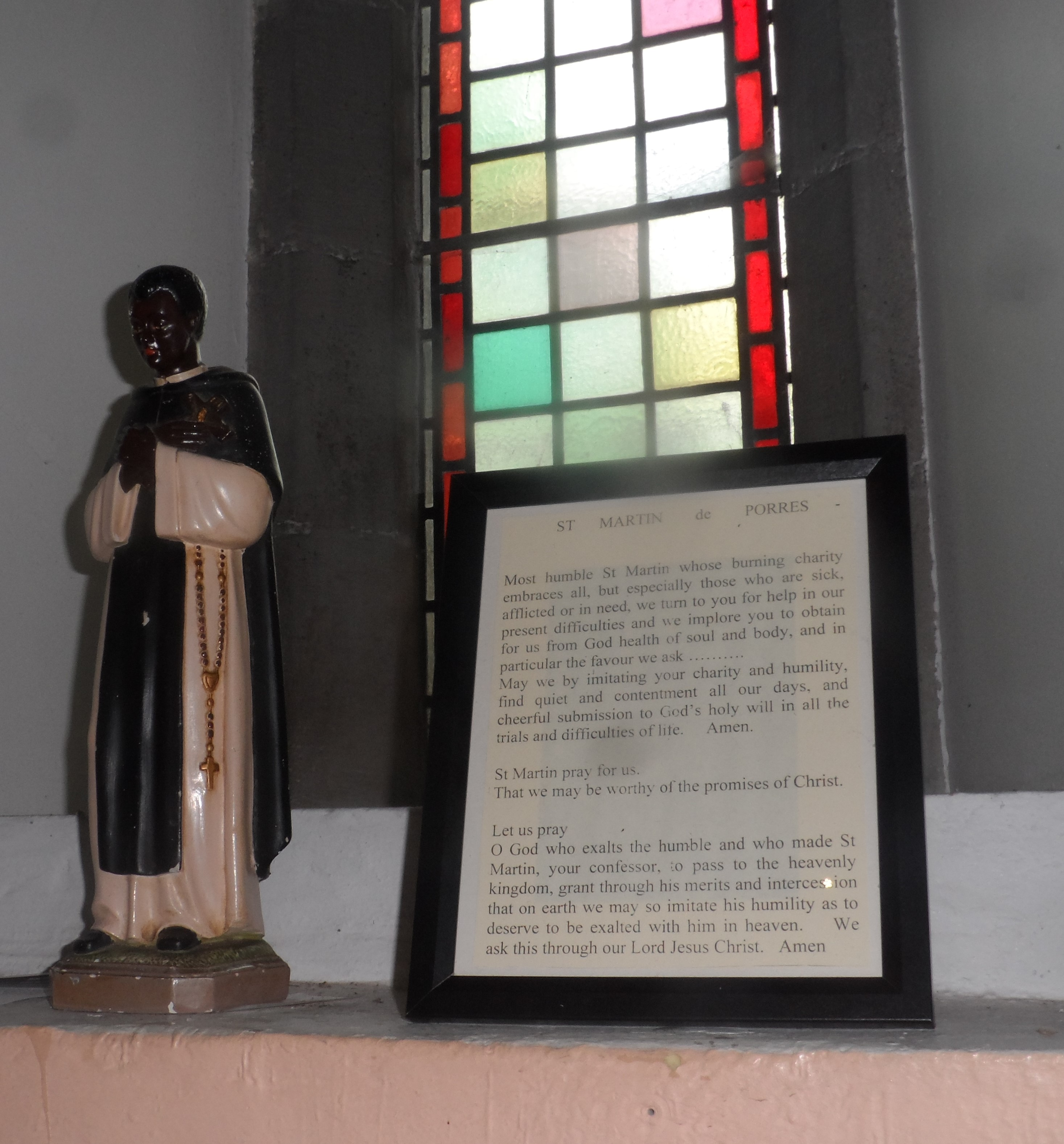
Devotional statue of Martin de Porres in Kildare, Ireland, depicting him with dark skin

Martin was a friend of both Saint Juan Macías, a fellow Dominican lay brother, and Saint Rose of Lima, another lay Dominican. By his death on 3 November 1639, he had won the affection and respect of many of his fellow Dominicans as well as a host of people outside the priory. Word of his miracles had made him known as a saint throughout the region. As his body was displayed to allow the people of the city to pay their respects, each person snipped a tiny piece of his habit to keep as a relic.

When the body of de Porres was exhumed after 25 years, it was reportedly found intact, and exuded a fine fragrance. Letters to Rome pleaded for his beatification; the decree affirming the heroism of his virtues was issued in 1763 by Pope Clement XIII. Pope Gregory XVI beatified Martin de Porres on 29 October 1837, and the cause for his canonization was opened on 8 June 1926.

Pope John XXIII canonized him in Rome on 6 May 1962. He is the patron saint of people of mixed race, and of innkeepers, barbers, public health workers and more, with a feast day on November 3. He is also commemorated within the Church of England as a friar.

== Iconography ==
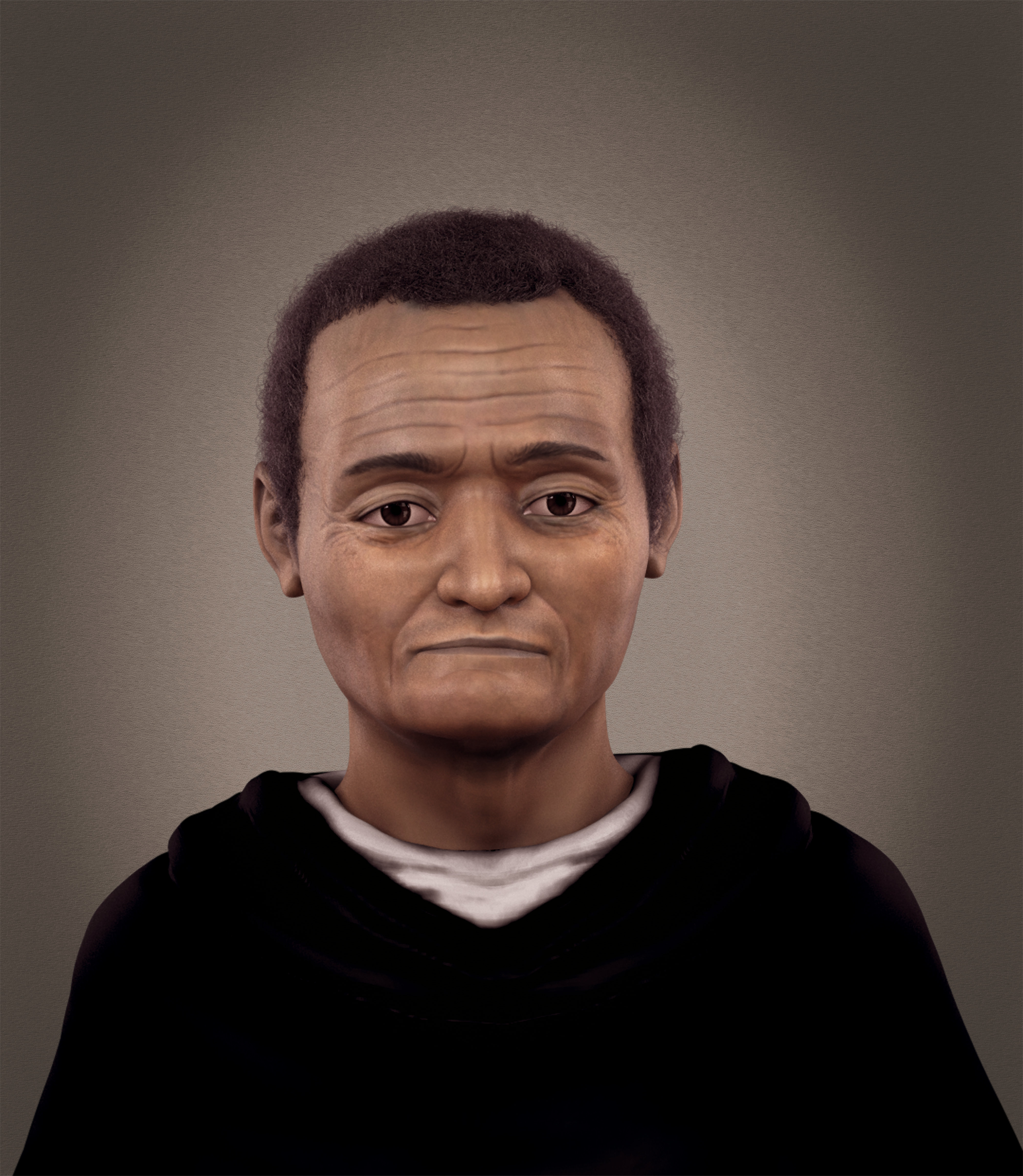
Forensic facial reconstruction of Martin de Porres

Martin de Porres is often depicted as a young mixed-race friar wearing the old habit of the Dominican lay brother, a black scapular and capuce, along with a broom, since he considered all work to be sacred, no matter how menial. He is sometimes shown with a dog, a cat and a mouse eating in peace from the same dish.

== Legacy ==
Martin's defiant attachment to the ideal of social justice achieved deep resonance in a church attempting to carry forward that ideal in today's modern world.

Today, Martin is commemorated by, among other things, a school building that houses the medical, nursing, and rehabilitation science schools of the Dominican University of Santo Tomas in the Philippines. A programme of work is also named after him at the Las Casas Institute at Blackfriars Hall, University of Oxford. He is the titular saint of the parish of St. Martin de Porres in Poughkeepsie, New York, and some elementary schools. A number of Catholic churches are named after him. The Southern Province of Dominicans in the United States also bears his name.

== In popular culture ==
In 1965, American composer E. Anne Schwerdtfeger composed the Mass of St. Martin de Porres for chorus and organ.

In the 1980 novel A Confederacy of Dunces, Ignatius Reilly contemplates praying to Martin for aid in bringing social justice to the black workers at the New Orleans factory where he works. In music, the first track of jazz pianist Mary Lou Williams's album Black Christ of the Andes is titled "St. Martin De Porres".

There are several Spanish and Mexican works regarding his life in cinema and television, starring Cuban actor Rene Muñoz, most of them referring to his mixed race, his miracles and his life of humility. The best known movies are Fray Escoba (Friar Broom) (1963) and Un mulato llamado Martin (A Mulatto Called Martin) (1975).

In the Moone Boy episode "Godfellas", the character Martin Moon is shown to be named by his grandfather after San Martin de Porres. His grandfather is unable to actually remember any of San Martin's accomplishments, and simply refers to him as "one of the black ones" when asked about him.

American singer Madonna's hit single "Like a Prayer" (1989) featured Martin de Porres as a character in the song's music video. The portrayal of de Porres and Madonna in a romantic relationship was met with mixed criticism from the Catholic church in Peru and the Vatican.

The name is used as an alias by the titular character of the 1997 movie The Saint.

== See also ==
- Saint Martin de Porres (sculpture) by Father Thomas McGlynn
- Saint Martin de Porres, patron saint archive
