= Roosevelt Organ Works =

American pipe organ manufacturer

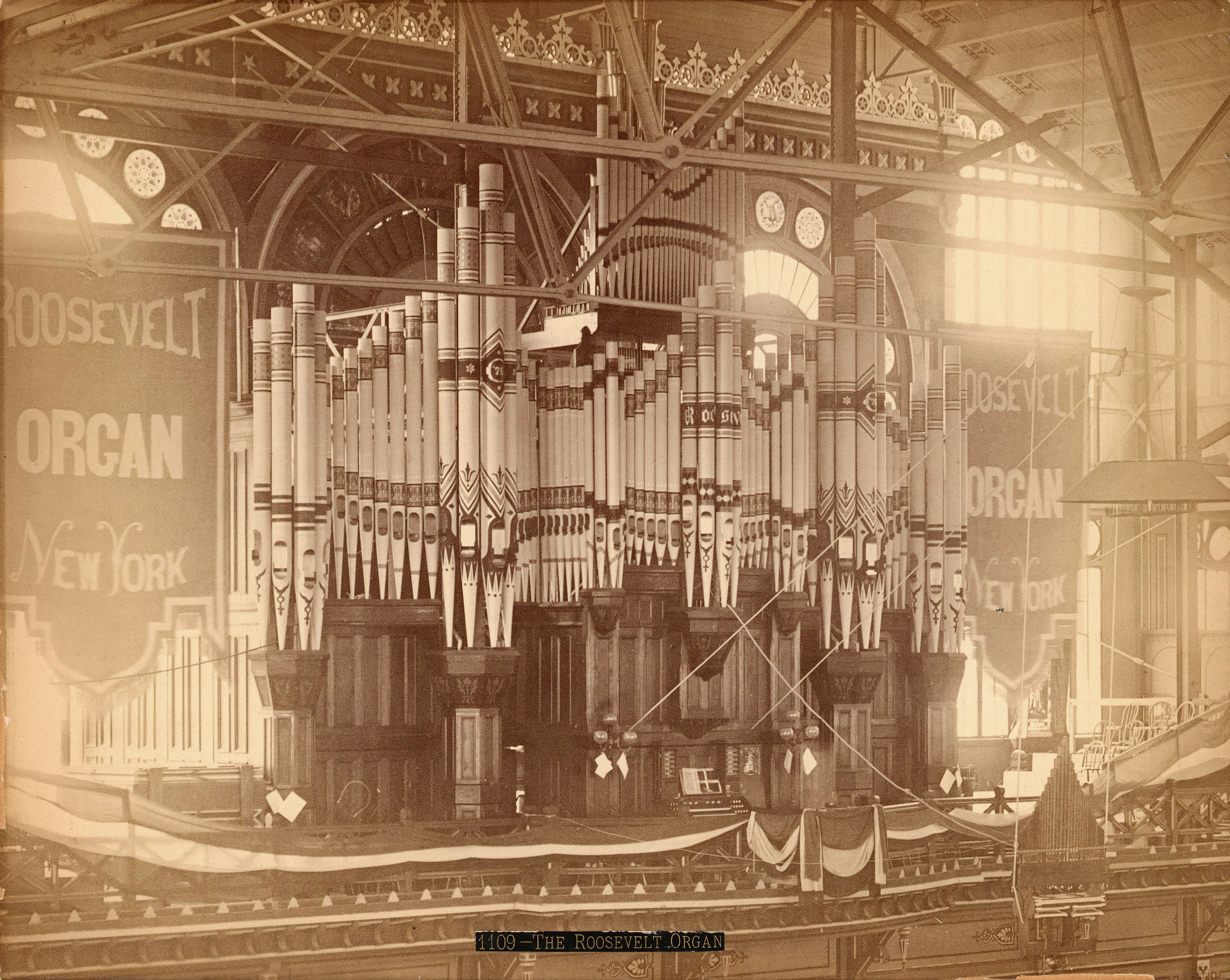
Pipe organ built by the Roosevelt Organ Works at the U.S. Centennial Exhibition in Philadelphia, 1876

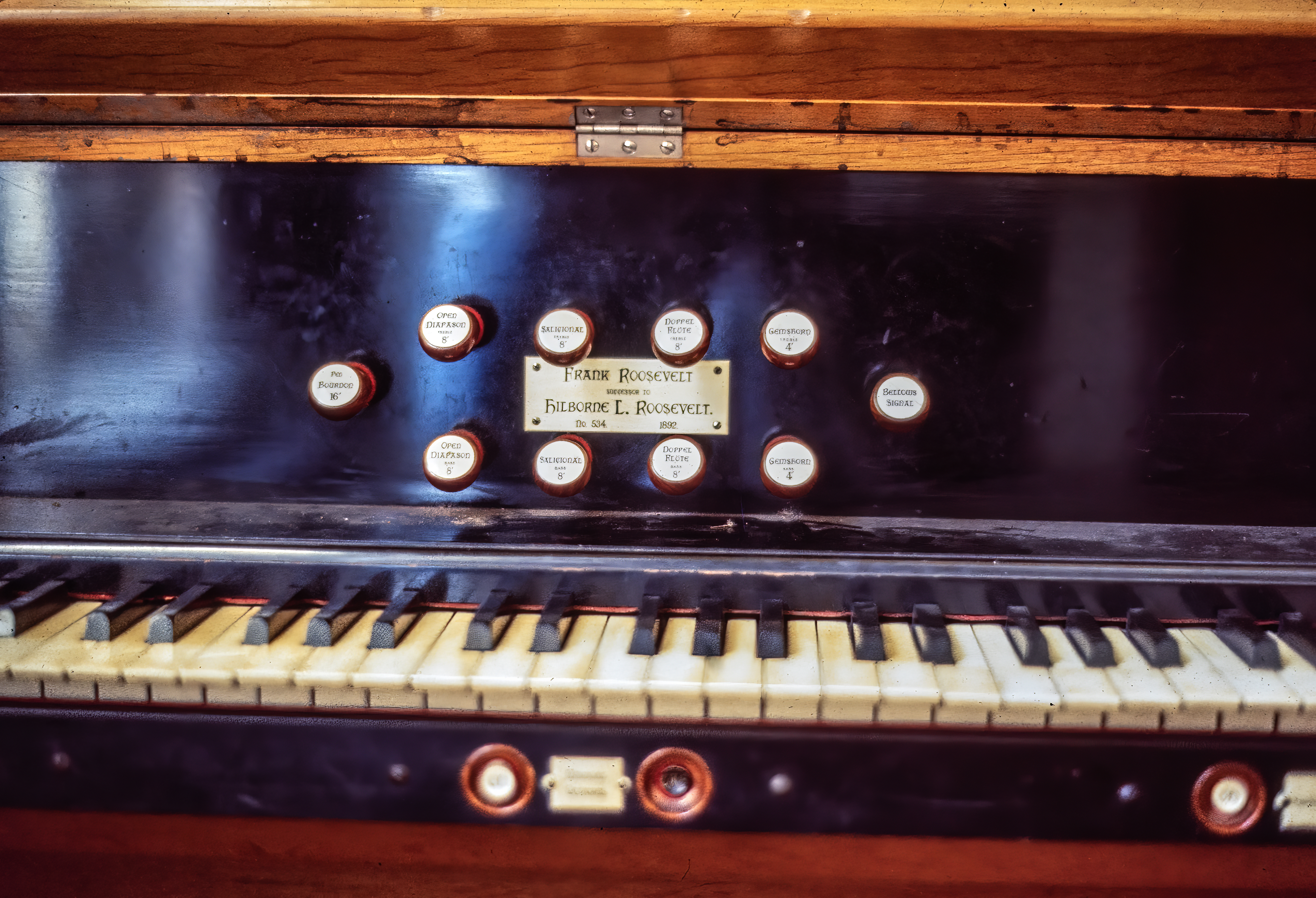
An 1892 Roosevelt organ in the parish hall of All Saints Episcopal Church, Frederick, Maryland

Roosevelt Organ Works was an American manufacturer of pipe organs. It was founded by Hilborne Roosevelt (1849–1886) and his younger brother, Frank Roosevelt (1862–1895), in 1872. It operated in New York City, with branches in Baltimore and Philadelphia. The brothers built some of the largest organs in the United States during their career, and many today are still prized for their quality and tone. The company was in operation until 1893.

The Roosevelt brothers were among the first to introduce electricity into organ building.

== Partial list of works ==
Roosevelt organ installations include the following:

- Chapel of Immaculate Conception, College of Mount Saint Vincent, Riverdale, Bronx, New York (Opus 4 II/16 - 1873/1880)
- Episcopal Cathedral of the Incarnation, Garden City, New York
- Trinity Church, New York, New York
- Church of the Holy Communion, New York, New York
- All Saints Roman Catholic Church, Harlem, New York
- Old First Reformed Church, Brooklyn, New York
- Christ Church, Glendale, Ohio
- Grace Protestant Episcopal Church, New York, New York
- First Presbyterian Church (Buffalo, New York)
- First Presbyterian Church, New York, New York
- Grace & St. Peter's Episcopal Church, Baltimore, Maryland
- First Baptist Church in America, Providence, Rhode Island (Opus 150)
- First Baptist Church, Nashville, Tennessee, (Opus 291 - 1885)
- Elberon Memorial Church, erected 1886 as a memorial to Moses Taylor Elberon, New Jersey.http://elberonmemorialchurch.com
- Trinity United Methodist Church, 1820 Broadway, Denver Colorado (1888) (Op. 380)
- La Compañía de Jesús Church, Quito, Ecuador (1888) 1104 pipes.
- Trinity Church, Kansas City, Missouri (1888) (Both the church building and the organ were destroyed.)
- First Methodist Church, Boulder, Colorado (Opus 382)
- Memorial Presbyterian Church, St. Augustine, Florida (1890)
- First Presbyterian Church of Wilkes-Barre, Wilkes-Barre, Pennsylvania (1890), No. 409
- St, James Roman Catholic Church, Chicago, Illinois (1891)
- St. Peter's Episcopal Church, New York (Opus 515 - 1892)
- Cathedral of the Immaculate Conception, Syracuse, New York (1892)
- Cathedral of the Assumption, (later "Basilica") Baltimore, Maryland (1884) Op. 143, tracker action to ventil windchests.
- Saugerties Reformed Church in Saugerties, New York (1892), Opus 530.
- St. Dominic Church in Washington, DC (1885)
- Crouse College, Syracuse University in Syracuse New York
- Christ Church Cathedral, St. Louis, Missouri
