= Eleanor Boyle Ewing Sherman =

American Catholic organizer

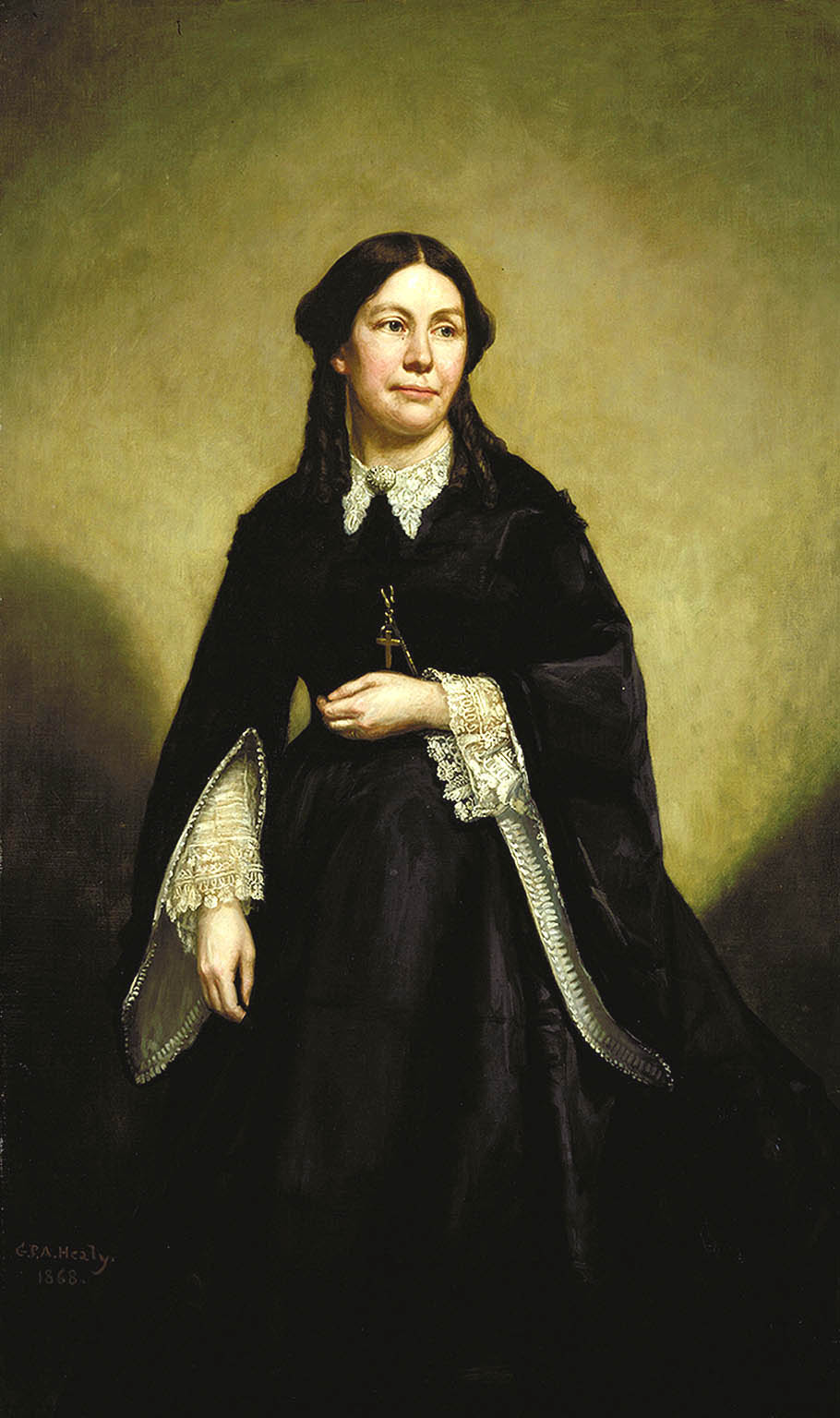
Eleanor Boyle Ewing Sherman, portrait by G.P.A. Healy (1868)

Eleanor Boyle Ewing Sherman (October 4, 1824 – November 28, 1888) was the wife of General William Tecumseh Sherman, a leading Union general in the American Civil War. She was also a prominent figure of the times in her own right.

== Early years ==
Eleanor (nickname, "Ellen") Boyle Ewing was born in Lancaster, Ohio, the daughter of prominent Whig politician Thomas Ewing and Maria Boyle Ewing. Her parents also raised her future husband, William Tecumseh "Cump" Sherman, after the 1829 death of his father.

She was educated primarily in Lancaster, OH, and Washington, D.C. In 1832, while her mother Maria was visiting her husband in DC, Ellen was sent to a convent school in Somerset run by Dominican Sisters, much to her apparent displeasure. During her many months stay, Ellen got so homesick that she ended up hopping on a stagecoach by herself in the hopes that she could make her way back to Lancaster, OH to visit her home. Luck would have it that her uncle, Judge William W. Irvin, was on the same coach, and he was able to secure her travels so she could spend a few days at home before being sent back to the convent until her mother picked her up later that year.

== Life ==
She married William Tecumseh "Cump" Sherman in Washington, D.C., on May 1, 1850, in a ceremony attended by President Zachary Taylor and other political luminaries. The Shermans, who often lived apart even before the Civil War due to Sherman's military career, had eight children together, two of whom (Willie and Charles) died during the war.

Although women did not have the right to vote in her day, Ellen declared herself to favor Abraham Lincoln in advance of the 1860 elections and was fierce in her pro-Union sentiment. During the Civil War, in addition to her husband, three of her four then-living brothers became Union generals: Hugh Boyle Ewing, Thomas Ewing, Jr., and Charles Ewing. In addition, Ellen worked to protect her husband's military standing during the war, especially in a January 1862 Washington meeting with Lincoln at a time when General Sherman's reputation was under a cloud due to newspaper charges of insanity.

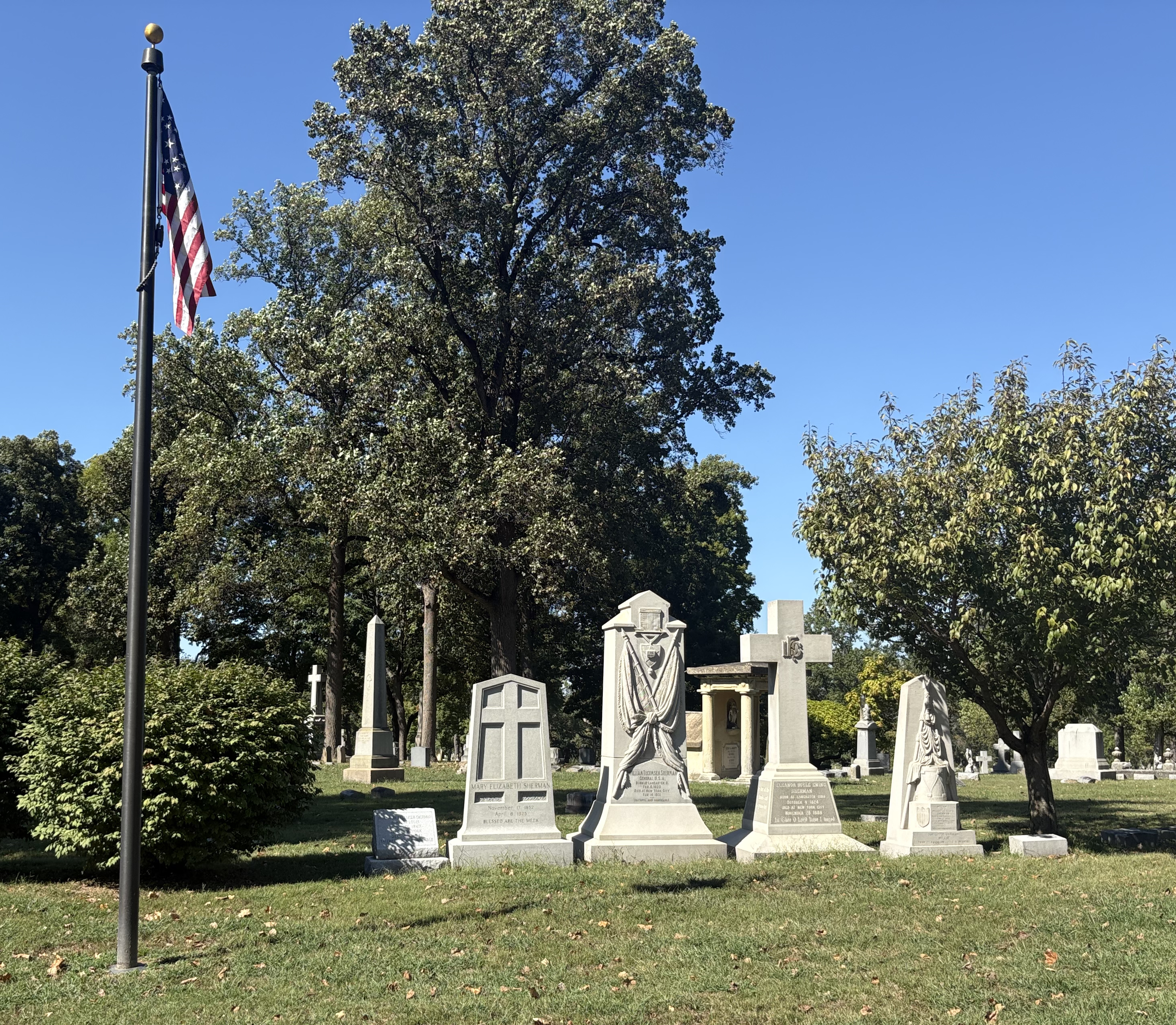
Graves of Sherman and family at Calvary Cemetery

Like her mother, Ellen was a devout Catholic and often at odds with her husband over religious topics. Ellen raised her eight children in that faith. In 1864, Ellen took up temporary residence in South Bend, Indiana, to have her young family educated at the University of Notre Dame and St. Mary's College. One of their sons, Thomas Ewing Sherman, became a Catholic priest. She also took an ongoing interest in Indian missions and was credited as the principal organizer of the Catholic Indian Missionary Association. In "the most absorbing and monumental work of her life," Ellen played an active role in U.S. observances of the Golden Jubilee of Pope Pius IX (May 21, 1877) for which she later received the personal thanks of the Pope.

Mrs. Sherman died in New York City on November 28, 1888, survived by her husband and six of their children. She is buried in Calvary Cemetery in St. Louis, Missouri; her tombstone there identifies her as Eleanor Boyle Ewing Sherman.

== Family ==
Ellen was daughter to Thomas Ewing and Maria Boyle Ewing. She was mother to eight children, and often spent much of her time parenting them by herself as William T. Sherman traveled for work.

- Maria Ewing ("Minnie") (1851–1913)
- Mary Elizabeth ("Lizzie") (1852–1925)
- William Tecumseh Jr. ("Willie") (1854–1863)
- Thomas Ewing (1856–1933)
- Eleanor Mary ("Ellie"), later Eleanor Sherman Thackara (1859–1915)
- Rachel Ewing (1861–1919)
- Charles Celestine (1864–1864)
- Philemon Tecumseh (1867–1941)

== Works ==
- Memorial of Thomas Ewing, of Ohio (New York: Catholic Publication Society, 1873).
- The William Tecumseh Sherman Family Letters (posthumous, 1967). Microfilm collection prepared by the Archives of the University of Notre Dame contains letters, etc. from Ellen Sherman, her husband, and others.
