= Thomas Ewing Sherman =

American lawyer and Catholic priest

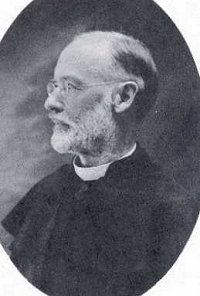
Father Thomas Ewing Sherman, 1914

Thomas Ewing Sherman, S.J. (October 12, 1856 – April 29, 1933) was an American lawyer, educator, and Catholic priest. He was the fourth child and second son of Union Army General William Tecumseh Sherman and his wife Ellen Ewing Sherman.

== Life ==
Sherman was named after his maternal grandfather Thomas Ewing, a U.S. Senator and cabinet secretary. Tom was born in San Francisco, California, while his father worked there as a bank executive. His mother, Ellen, was of Irish ancestry on her mother's side and devoutly Catholic. During the American Civil War (1861–1865), Tom's father rose to become one of the most important generals in the United States Army. When his superior, Ulysses S. Grant, became President of the United States, William Tecumseh Sherman was appointed commanding general of the army.

Tom was brought up in St. Louis and Washington. He attended the preparatory department of Georgetown College and graduated with a B.A. degree from that institution in 1874. He then entered Yale University's Sheffield Scientific School as a graduate student in English literature. He received a law degree from Washington University in St. Louis in 1878 and was admitted to the bar, but to his father's great and lasting displeasure he soon gave up the profession of the law in order to study for priesthood in the Roman Catholic Church. That same year he joined the Jesuit Order and studied for three years in Jesuit novitiates in St Mary's Hall in Lancashire, England, and Frederick, Maryland.

The elder Sherman wrote a letter to John McCloskey, Archbishop of New York, in 1879 telling him to dissuade his son from such a course of action. However, the Cardinal encouraged the boy in his vocation after visiting with him. In response, the General condemned McCloskey in a St. Louis, Missouri newspaper in offensive terms and accused him of robbing him of a son. When pressed for comment by the newspaper's editor, McCloskey simply replied that General Sherman's letter was marked 'personal and confidential.

He was ordained as priest in 1889 by a friend of his mother's, Archbishop Patrick Ryan of Philadelphia; and belonged to the Western Province of the Jesuit Order (headquarters in St. Louis). He taught for some years in Jesuit colleges, principally at Saint Louis University and in Detroit.

He presided over General Sherman's funeral mass in 1891 and was in demand as a public lecturer, frequently speaking out against anti-Catholic prejudice in the United States. He obtained a commission as an army chaplain during the Spanish–American War of 1898, without consulting his Jesuit superiors. Beginning in 1899, he used St. Ignatius College Prep in Chicago as his base for speaking and writing. While in his mid-fifties, he began experiencing mental problems and long bouts of clinical depression. In 1914, he withdrew from the Jesuit community and lived in various places in Europe and the United States before settling in Santa Barbara, California. In poor health, after 1931 he lived with his wealthy niece Eleanor Sherman Fitch in New Orleans, Louisiana, where he died of acute dilation of the heart and arteriosclerosis, at the age of 76. He had renewed his Jesuit vows just shortly before his death.

Father Sherman is buried next to Father John Salter, the nephew of Confederate Vice President Alexander Stephens, at St. Charles Borromeo Jesuit Cemetery in Grand Coteau. This is coincidental, as Father Salter was the next priest of the local Jesuit community to be buried there.
