= Hilborne Roosevelt =

Organ builder and inventor of telephone devices (1849–1886)

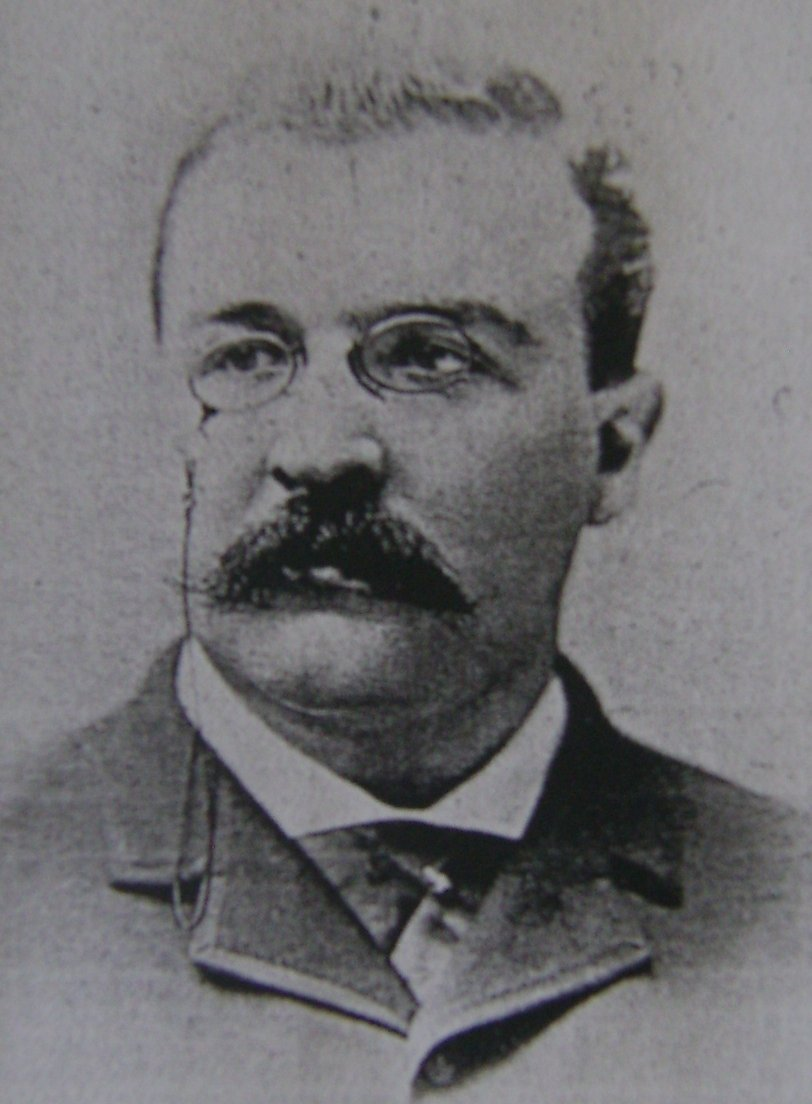
- Hilborne Lewis Roosevelt, ca. 1880
- Born: Hilborne Lewis Roosevelt; December 21, 1849; New York City, New York, U.S.
- Died: December 30, 1886 (aged 37); New York City, New York, U.S.
- Occupations: Organ builder and telecommunication engineer
- Spouse: Katherine Shippen (1883-1886)
- Children: Dorothy Quincy Roosevelt
- Parent(s): Silas Weir Roosevelt & Mary West
- Relatives: Theodore Roosevelt, Franklin D. Roosevelt

Hilborne Lewis Roosevelt (December 21, 1849 – December 30, 1886) was a pioneering organ builder, telecommunication engineer, and a member of the Roosevelt family.

== Life ==
Roosevelt was born in New York City to Silas Weir Roosevelt, a son of Cornelius Roosevelt and Mary West. He was thus a cousin of Presidents Theodore Roosevelt and Franklin D. Roosevelt.

Roosevelt did not take to either business or politics, the traditional Roosevelt family occupations. Instead, he was musically and mechanically inclined and wanted to be an organ builder from early childhood, entering an apprenticeship at an organ factory. He later traveled to Europe for further training in the field. His relatives frowned upon a mechanical occupation, but when he began to make money, his family was reassured.

Roosevelt was particularly interested in the electric action organ, and was one of the first to study the application of new electrical devices to the manufacture of organ actions. He took out the first patent in the United States for an electric action for the pipe organ when he was 20, and built the first electric action organ in the United States for the Philadelphia Centennial Exposition. Though primarily interested in the technical aspects, he had a good deal of business acumen as well, establishing factories in New York City, Philadelphia, and Baltimore. Hilborne founded the Roosevelt Pipe Organ Builders in 1870 with his brother Frank and built some of the largest organs in the United States during his career.

Roosevelt was also widely known among electricians for inventing several details of the telephone including the automatic switch-hook, for which he received royalties for many years (even though Thomas A. Watson claimed to be the first), and held an interest in the Bell Telephone Company.

== Personal life ==
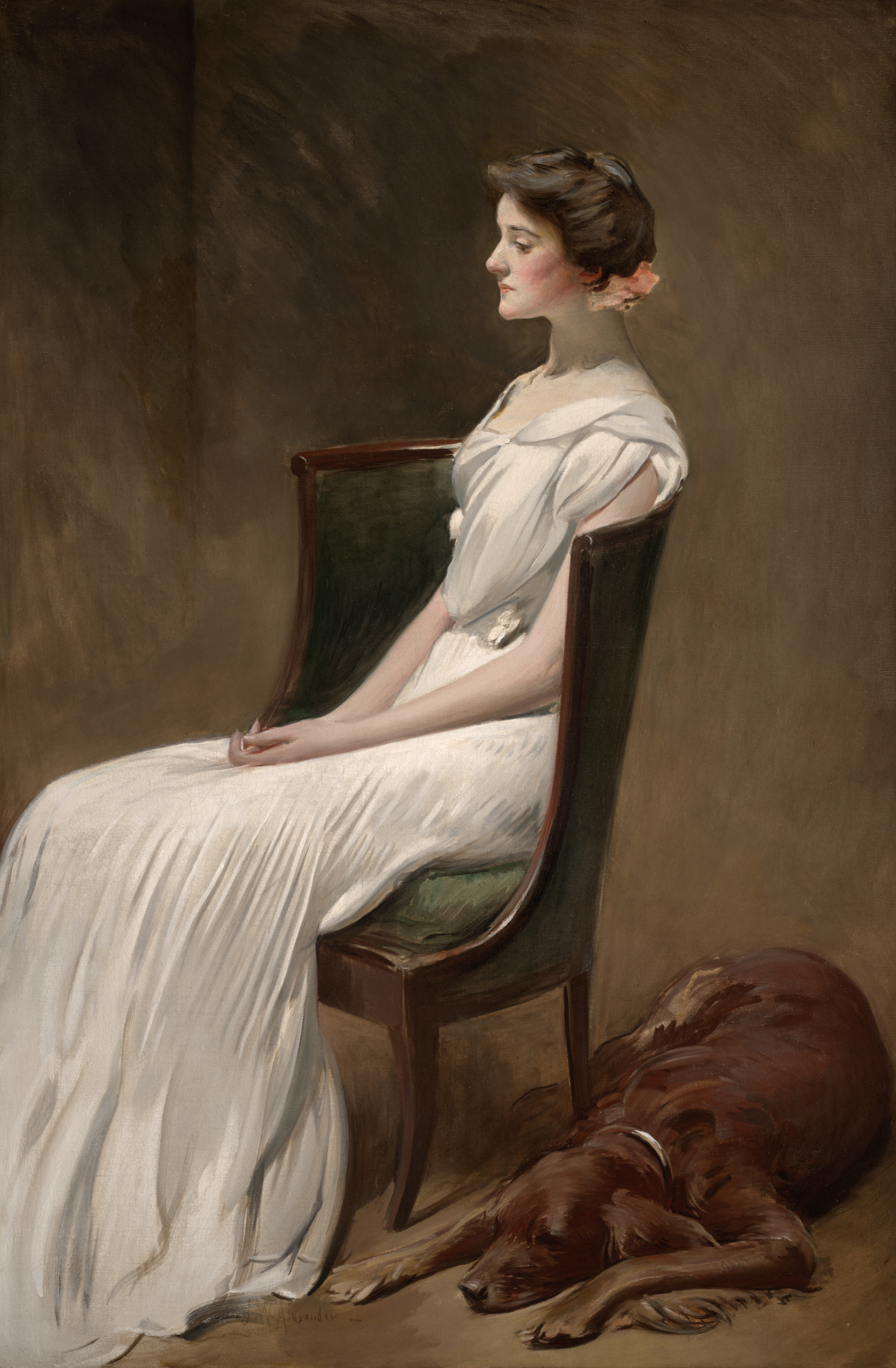
Portrait of his daughter, Dorothy Quincy Roosevelt, by John White Alexander

Roosevelt married Katherine Shippen on February 1, 1883, and had one child, Dorothy Quincy Roosevelt (born 1884). He died at his home in the Chelsea neighborhood of Manhattan at the age of 37 on December 30, 1886.
