= List of Ohio's American Civil War generals =

During the American Civil War, Ohio contributed many officers, politicians, and troops to the Union war effort; as well as a small number for the Confederacy.

== Union ==
The following is a partial list of generals or rear admirals either born in Ohio or living in Ohio when they joined the Union Army or Union Navy (or in a few cases, men who were buried in Ohio following the war, although they did not directly serve in Ohio units). There also were 134 men given the brevet rank of brigadier general, and occasionally brevet major general, a few of whom are also included in this listing.

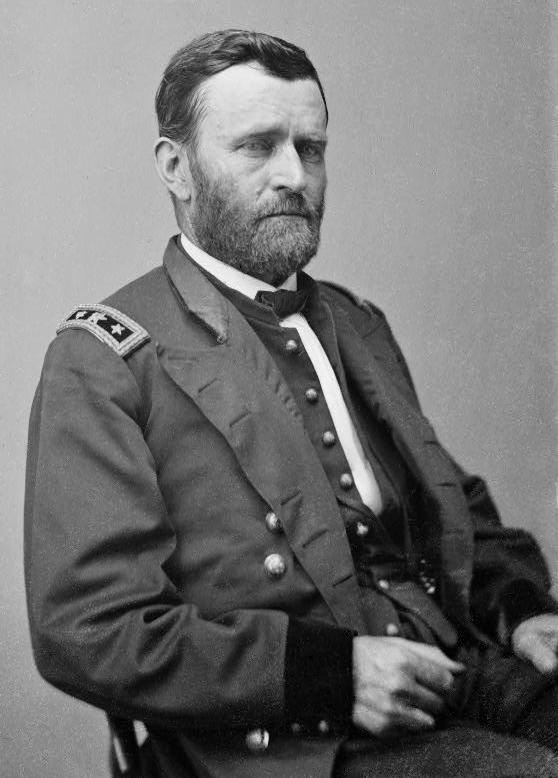
Lt.Gen. Ulysses S. Grant

- Russell Alger
- Robert Allen
- Daniel Ammen
- Jacob Ammen
- Nicholas L. Anderson
- Thomas M. Anderson
- Joseph Bailey
- Henry B. Banning
- Joshua Hall Bates
- John Beatty
- Samuel Beatty
- Benjamin W. Brice
- Roeliff Brinkerhoff
- William T. H. Brooks
- Catharinus P. Buckingham
- Ralph P. Buckland
- Don Carlos Buell
- William W. Burns
- Cyrus Bussey
- John Allen Campbell
- Henry B. Carrington
- Samuel S. Carroll
- Henry M. Cist
- James M. Comly
- Jacob D. Cox
- George Crook
- George A. Custer
- Joel A. Dewey
- Charles C. Doolittle
- Charles Ewing
- Hugh Ewing
- Thomas Ewing, Jr.
- Lucius Fairchild
- James W. Forsyth
- John W. Fuller
- James A. Garfield
- Kenner Garrard
- Charles C. Gilbert
- Quincy A. Gillmore
- Robert S. Granger
- Ulysses S. Grant
- William Grose
- Charles Griffin
- Charles G. Harker
- Andrew L. Harris
- Benjamin Harrison
- Philip C. Hayes
- Rutherford B. Hayes
- William B. Hazen
- Andrew Hickenlooper
- Edward H. Hobson
- Joseph Hooker
- Henry J. Hunt
- Albert Kautz
- Augustus V. Kautz
- Joseph W. Keifer
- Robert P. Kennedy
- Edward N. Kirk
- Mortimer D. Leggett
- Eli Long
- William H. Lytle
- Jasper A. Maltby
- Mahlon D. Manson
- John S. Mason
- George B. McClellan
- Alexander M. McCook
- Anson G. McCook
- Daniel McCook, Jr.
- Edward M. McCook
- Edwin S. McCook
- George McCook
- Robert L. McCook
- Irvin McDowell
- Nathan C. McLean
- William L. McMillen
- James B. McPherson
- John G. Mitchell
- Robert B. Mitchell
- Ormsby M. Mitchel
- George W. Morgan
- Emerson Opdycke
- Thomas O. Osborn
- Marsena R. Patrick
- Eleazar A. Paine
- Halbert E. Paine
- Abram S. Piatt
- Orlando Poe
- Joseph H. Potter
- John Pope
- Benjamin Potts
- William H. Powell
- James W. Reilly
- James Sidney Robinson
- William Rosecrans
- Benjamin P. Runkle
- Jeremiah M. Rusk
- Delos B. Sackett
- Eliakim P. Scammon
- James F. Schenck
- Robert C. Schenck
- Robert K. Scott
- William T. Sherman
- Philip H. Sheridan
- Isaac R. Sherwood
- Joshua W. Sill
- John P. Slough
- Thomas Kilby Smith
- William Sooy Smith
- John W. Sprague
- David S. Stanley
- James Blair Steedman
- Wager Swayne
- John C. Tidball
- Edward D. Townsend
- James M. Tuttle
- Erastus B. Tyler
- Ferdinand Van Derveer
- Melancthon S. Wade
- George D. Wagner
- Charles C. Walcutt
- William H. L. Wallace
- Willard Warner
- Godfrey Weitzel
- Thomas Welsh
- August Willich
- Thomas J. Wood
- Charles R. Woods
- William B. Woods

== Confederacy ==
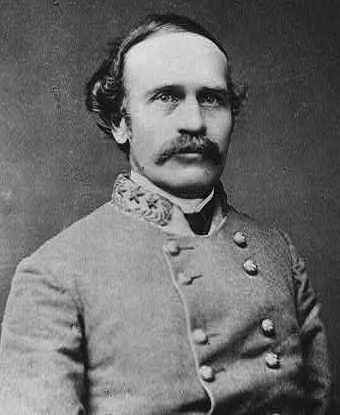
Maj.Gen. Bushrod Johnson

In addition, the following Ohioans served as generals in the Confederate States Army:

- Charles Clark
- Robert H. Hatton
- Bushrod Johnson
- Philip N. Luckett
- Daniel H. Reynolds
- Roswell S. Ripley
- Otho F. Strahl

== See also ==
- Ohio in the American Civil War
- List of American Civil War generals (Union)
- List of American Civil War brevet generals (Union)
- List of American Civil War generals (Confederate)
