= General Ewing =

General Ewing may refer to:

- Charles Ewing (general) (1835–1883), Union Army brigadier general
- Hugh Boyle Ewing (1826–1905), Union Army brigadier general and brevet major general
- James Ewing (Pennsylvania politician) (1736–1806), Pennsylvania Militia brigadier general
- Thomas Ewing Jr. (1829–1896), Union Army brevet major general
