= William H. Ketcham =

American clergyman (1868–1921)

Wiliam H. Ketcham
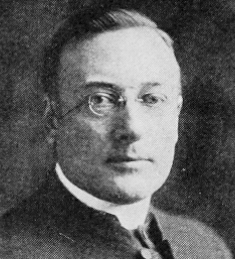
- Born: Wiliam Henry Ketcham; June 1, 1868; Sumner, Iowa, US
- Died: November 14, 1921 (aged 53); Tucker, Mississippi, US
- Education: St. Charles College
- Occupation: Clergyman

Wiliam Henry Ketcham (June 1, 1868 – November 14, 1921), also known as Father Ketcham or Ketchum, was the Director of the Bureau of Catholic Indian Missions, and Commissioner of the U.S. Board of Indian Commissioners. His Catholic missionary work earned him the honorary names "Wambli Wakita" or Watching Eagle in Sioux and "Apostle of the Indians."

== Early life ==
William Henry Ketcham was born in Sumner, Iowa to Alonzo Bernardo Ketcham and Josephine Shanafelt. Both of his parents were Anglicans of Puritan ancestry.

In 1885 Ketcham was sent to the Jesuit St. Charles College in Iowa and was received into the Catholic church that same year. Later on in life, his sister, Ella, his mother and his father all became Catholics. In 1889, Oklahoma was opened up to white settlers and Ketcham and his family moved to this "new country." William would remain a lifelong devotee to Oklahoma and is quoted as saying:

"I claim Oklahoma as my home — my father, mother and sister live in Oklahoma City — and I am particularly interested in the welfare of the Indian population, which to my mind is inseparable from Oklahoma. According to our Choctaw language, Oklahoma means " 'Red People,' for it is composed of Choctaw words 'Okla' (signifying 'people') and 'homa,' which means 'red'."

Father Ketcham was ordained by Reverend Theophile Meerschaert at Guthrie in 1892. He was the first priest for this Vicariate, earning him the title proto-priest.

== Career ==
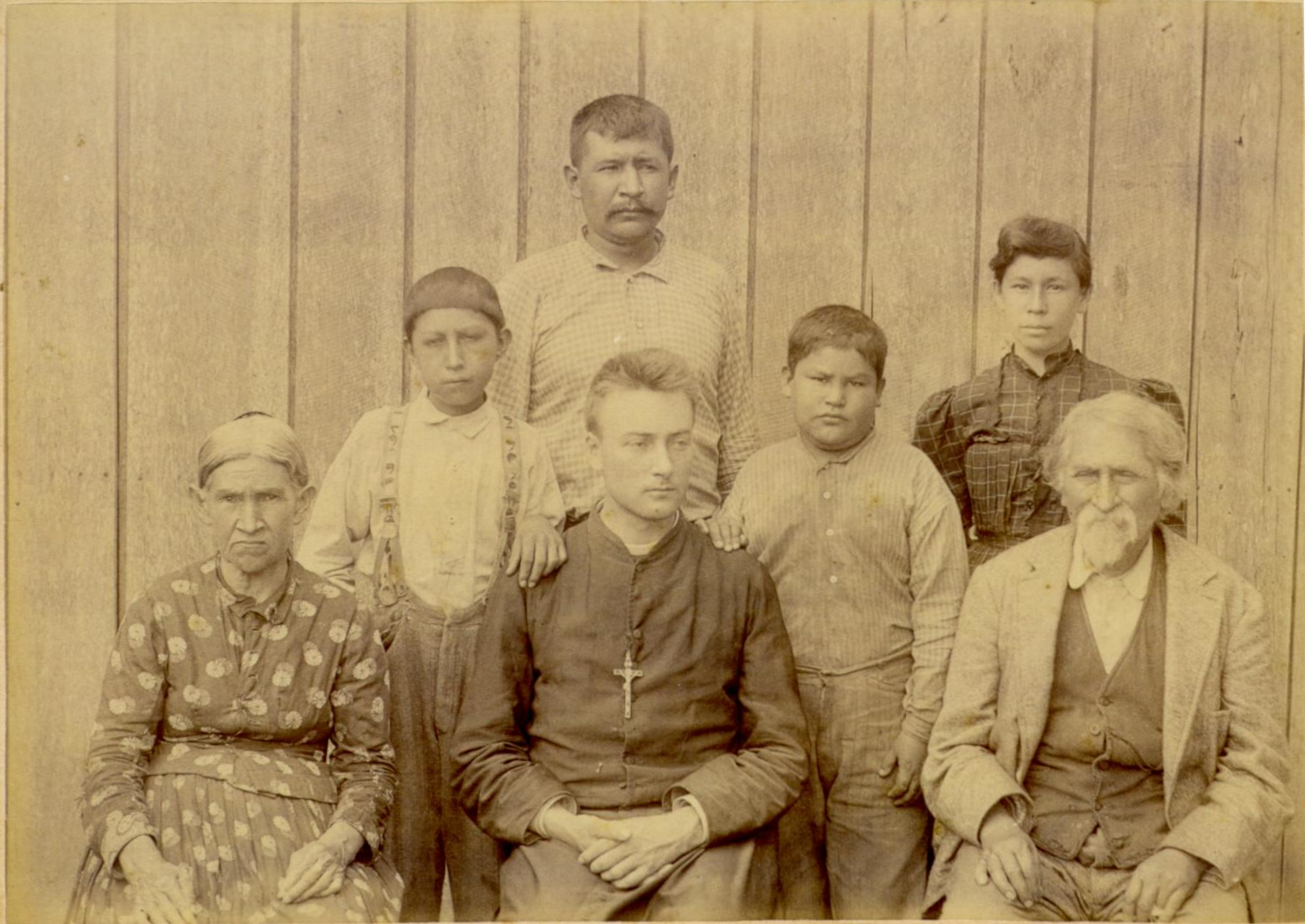
Ketcham (seated, center) surrounded by some members of the Splitlog family

After his ordination, Father Ketcham first came to Cayuga Springs, OK where the Wyandots had moved to in 1874. Mathias Splitlog sent for him shortly after, in 1893 Ketcham confirmed both Splitlog and his wife and they began work on the Splitlog Church that same year. Father Ketcham was appointed missionary to the people of Cherokee and Creek Nations in Oklahoma. His dedication to his missionary work and his zeal for founding new missions did not go unnoticed and Father Meerschaert decided to transfer him in 1897 to the Choctaw Nation to continue his work. Within a year he had established missions at Albion, Cameron, Fanshawe, Howe, Poteau, Talihina, Tuskahoma and Wister. He realized, in order to increase his influence, he would need to learn the Choctaw language. He was only the second priest to endeavor to do so. His Choctaw language skills allowed him to publish various hymns, prayers and books in Choctaw.

In 1900, Father Ketcham was sent to Washington, D.C. to serve the Board of Indian Commissioners. He served the Board until his death, of which nine years as Commissioner.

In 1901, Father Ketcham became Director of the Bureau of Catholic Indian Missions. At this time, the government had just revoked all contracts with Indian schools and many Catholics saw the existence of the schools as a hopeless situation. The government reasoned that if Indian families had to pay for their children's education themselves, they would be encourage to become self sufficient. In reality, Indian families often lacked funds to pay tuition fees and had to enroll their children into government schools.

In response, Father Ketcham founded the Society for the Preservation of the Faith among Indian Children and a newspaper publication called The Indian Sentinel. Through membership feed and donations, Father Ketcham was able to prevent the closure of 42 Catholic Indian schools.

Under his administration, the Bureau's treasury had collected $1,600,000 by 1917 and disbursed it to the Indian missions, despite facing political and anti-Catholic opposition. He contributed an article on the Bureau to the Catholic Encyclopedia.

Father Ketcham was a staunch advocate for Indian families' choice of education. He was involved in overturning the Browning policy in 1901, that denied Indian parents the right to choose where their children went to school, letting the Indian Agents decide instead.

In 1904, he joined lobbying efforts to reinstate government rations to Indian children in the Indian Appropriations Act. In years prior, the government ruled that rations would only be handed out to children in government schools, non-sectarian schools or staying at home. The denial of rations forced Indian parents facing economic hardships or failed crops to enroll their children in government schools.

== Death ==
Father Ketcham died at eight o'clock on the morning of November 14, 1921 at the age of 53. He had been sent to the Choctaw Indian Mission of Tucker, Mississippi to compile a report for the Commissioner of Indian Affairs. After three weeks of work, Ketcham sent a letter to Washington D.C. relaying the message his return would be delayed because of an illness. The next morning at breakfast, he fell out of his chair, was quickly absolved and anointed and passed away.

== Publications ==
- A catechism of the Catholic religion (Kiahlik Iksa Nana-Aiyimmika), National Capital Press, Washington D.C: 1916.
