= Bernard Cullen =

Bernard Cullen or Bernie Cullen may refer to:

- Bernard Cullen (born 1950), Irish philosophy professor, submitter with Richard Kearney at the New Ireland Forum
- Bernard Cullen, American politician; see List of members of the Boston City Council
- Bernard Cullen, American educator, Director General of the Marquette League (1937–1957)

== See also ==
- Cullen (disambiguation)
