= Catholic Negro-American Mission Board =

The Catholic Negro-American Mission Board is a U.S. Roman Catholic institution that raises funds and supports mission work in among African Americans.

== History ==
In 1905, the Catholic archbishops of the United States determined that the needs for Catholic mission work in the black community exceeded the funding available from the annual appeal administered by the Commission for the Catholic Missions among the Colored People and the Indians. To create a second funding stream, the archbishops called for the establishment of the Catholic Board, which they incorporated in 1907 with Fr. John E. Burke as executive director in New York City.

Since its founding, the Catholic Board has supported hundreds of priests and women religious who served Black parishes and schools throughout the United States, and in so doing, it also endorsed efforts to address Black social concerns as well. The Catholic Board was renamed in 1970, and it joined the Black and Indian Mission office a decade later.

== Executive directors ==
- Father John E. Burke (1907–1925)
- Father Edward C. Kramer (1925–1962)
- Father Benjamin M. Horton (1962–1980); member, Josephite Fathers
- Monsignor Paul Lenz (1980–2007)
- Father Wayne Paysse (2007–2015)
- Father Maurice Henry Sands (2015-)

== Archival collections ==
Marquette University Special Collections and University Archives serves as the archival repository for the Catholic Negro-American Mission Board and its affiliated institutions, the Commission for the Catholic Missions among the Colored People and the Indians and the Bureau of Catholic Indian Missions. Collectively, these institutions comprise the Black and Indian Mission office. However, the archival records of the institutions are known as the Bureau of Catholic Indian Missions Records after the oldest of the three institutions, which has generated the bulk of the archival records. Marquette University provides selected images from the CNAMB records as a separate online digital collection, African American Catholics of the United States.

== See also ==
- Marquette University Special Collections and University Archives
