= Black and Indian Mission Office =

US Catholic organization

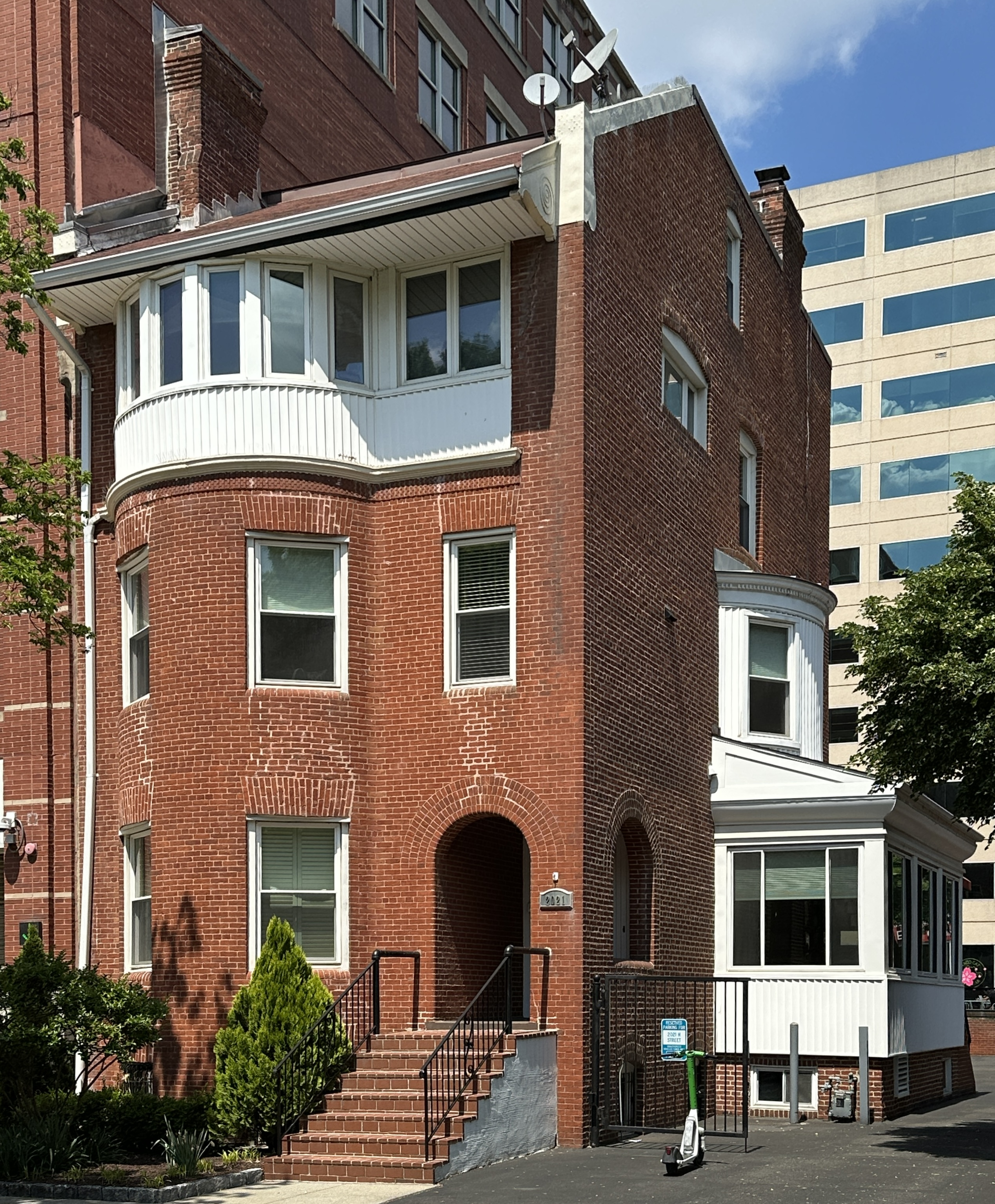
Black and Indian Mission Office in Washington, D.C.

The Black and Indian Mission Office is a Catholic organization in the United States comprising the Bureau of Catholic Indian Missions, the Commission for the Catholic Missions among the Colored People and the Indians and the Catholic Negro-American Mission Board, which are institutions for mission work that maintain separate functions but operate with one staff and one board of directors.

== History ==
The Bureau and the Commission have shared common offices in Washington, D.C., since 1935 and were joined by the Catholic Negro-American Mission Board in 1980. In 2009, the three institutions adopted the Black and Indian Mission Office as a banner for their joint webpage.

The Bureau of Catholic Indian Missions has supported and promoted Catholic missions among Native Americans and has defended the rights of Native Americans. It was founded as the Office of Catholic Commissioner for Indian Missions in 1874 with approval by J. Roosevelt Bayley, the Archbishop of Baltimore.

Since 1887, the Commission for the Catholic Missions among the Colored People and the Indians has administered a national annual Lenten collection to support African American and Native American missions. In 1884, the Third Plenary Council of Baltimore decreed the establishment of the Lenten collection and a commission of three bishops to administer it. Since the 1980s, the Commission and its collection have been known respectively as the Black and Indian Mission Office and the Black and Indian Mission collection.

The Catholic Negro-American Mission Board has supported and promoted Catholic missions among African Americans. It was founded in 1907 as the Catholic Board for Mission Work among the Colored People to provide a second national funding stream for Black Catholic missions.

== Archival collections ==
Marquette University Special Collections and University Archives serves as the archival repository for the three institutions of the Black and Indian Mission office. Their archival records comprise one collection known as the Bureau of Catholic Indian Missions, which generated the bulk of the records.
