= William Travers Jerome =

American lawyer and politician

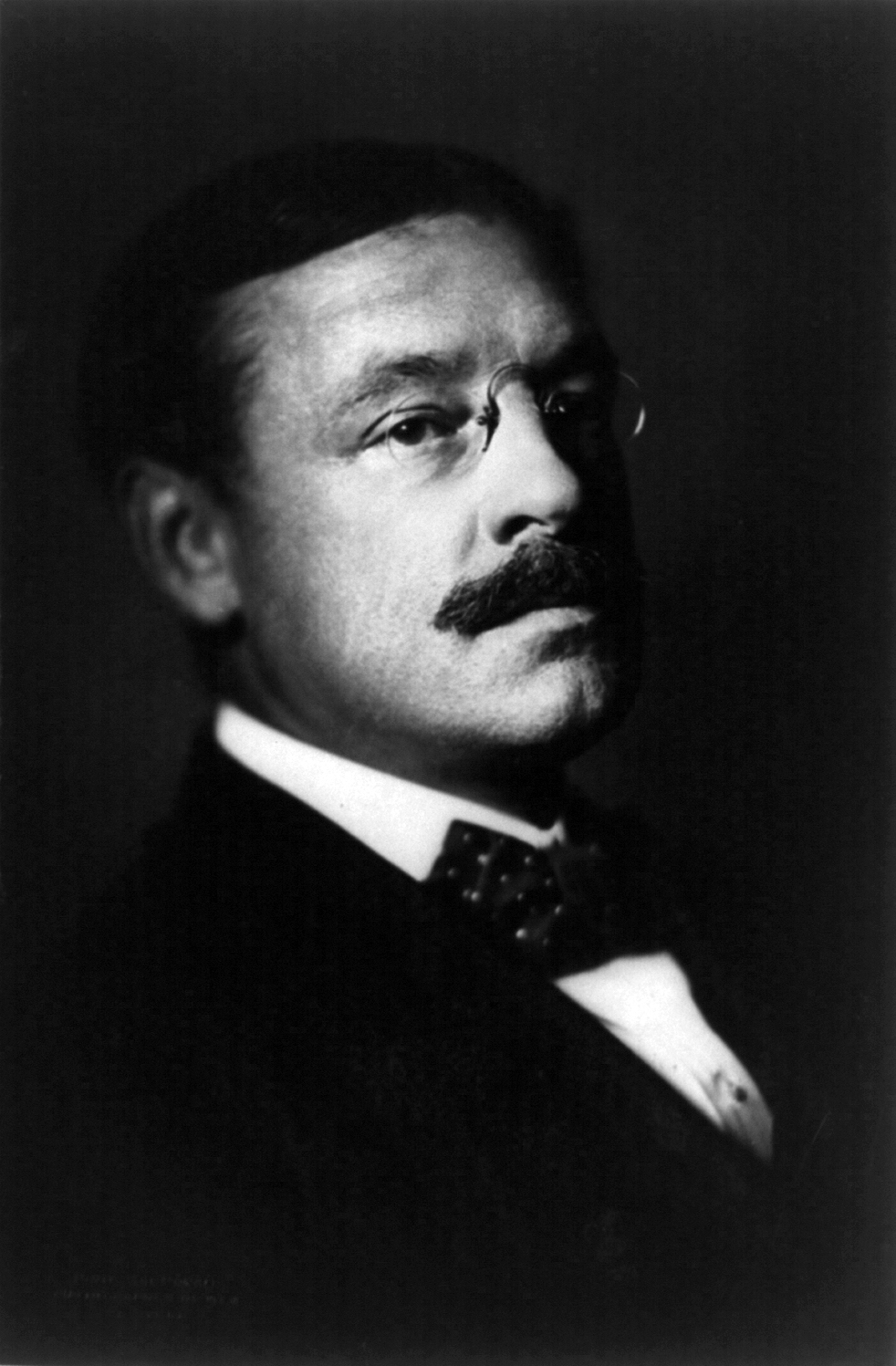
- William T. Jerome, 1905

New York County District Attorney
- In office 1902–1909
- Preceded by: Eugene A. Philbin
- Succeeded by: Charles S. Whitman

Personal details
- Born: April 18, 1859 New York City, New York, U.S.
- Died: February 13, 1934 (aged 74) New York City, New York, U.S.
- Cause of death: Pneumonia
- Spouse: Lavinia Taylor Howe (m. 1888)
- Relations: Leonard Jerome (uncle); Jennie Jerome (cousin); Winston Churchill (cousin)
- Children: William Travers Jerome, Jr.
- Parent(s): Lawrence Jerome; Kate Hall
- Education: Amherst College

William Travers Jerome (April 18, 1859 – February 13, 1934) was an American lawyer and politician from New York.

== Early life ==
William Travers Jerome was born in New York City on April 18, 1859. He was the son of Lawrence Jerome (1820–1888, Collector of the Port of Rochester, New York, under President Millard Fillmore, NYC Alderman 1871) and Kate (Hall) Jerome.

Financier Leonard Jerome was his uncle, Lady Jennie Jerome was his first cousin, and U.K. Prime Minister Winston Churchill was his first cousin once removed. Lady Jerome had married the son of the 7th Duke of Marlborough, and brother of the 8th Duke, with the family seat being Blenheim Palace.

He attended Amherst College but left in 1881 without graduation. He studied law, was admitted to the bar in 1884, and commenced practice in New York City.

== Career ==
From 1888 to 1890, he was a Deputy Assistant D.A. under John R. Fellows.

From 1894 to 1895, he worked for the Lexow Committee. In 1894, he managed the successful campaign of William L. Strong for Mayor of New York City. In 1895, the Court of Special Sessions was re-organized, legislating out of office the six incumbent justices. On July 1, 1895, Jerome took office as one of the first five new justices of the re-organized court.

He was New York County District Attorney from 1902 to 1909, elected in 1901 on the Fusion ticket headed by Seth Low. As D.A. he led a campaign against political corruption and crime, often leading raids personally, notably the one against the gambling house of Richard Canfield. On October 13, 1905, the Republican county convention nominated Judge Charles A. Flammer for D.A. with a vote of 237 to 9.

However, Jerome had a popular following and ran as an independent candidate. Shortly before election day, Flammer withdrew as a candidate, and the Republican Party sought to back Jerome again. On October 27 the county convention met again and nominated Jerome in place of Flammer unanimously. However, it was too late to change the names on the ballots, the limit being 20 days before the election. Thus Jerome was re-elected with a plurality of about 4,000 votes as an Independent, while Flammer received more than 12,000 votes on the Republican ticket. Jerome's successful re-election was considered a victory against machine politics.

In 1907 and 1908, Jerome prosecuted Harry Kendall Thaw for the murder of Stanford White.

In September 1910, Jerome defended successfully former State Engineer Frederick Skene against charges of grand larceny in office.

== Personal life ==
On May 9, 1888, he married Lavinia Taylor Howe, of Elizabeth, New Jersey, and their son was William Travers Jerome, Jr.

He died of pneumonia on February 13, 1934, at his townhouse 125 East 36th Street in Manhattan.

== Sources ==
- LAWRENCE JEROME DEAD, his father's obit, in NYT on August 13, 1888
- COURT IN THE CORRIDOR in NYT on July 2, 1895
- GREATER NEW YORK DEMOCRACY'S CONVENTION in NYT on October 2, 1901
- VICTORY FOR THE FUSION TICKET in NYT on November 6, 1901
- FLAMMER IS NAMED in NYT on October 14, 1905
- REPUBLICAN CONVENTION UNANIMOUS FOR JEROME in NYT on October 28, 1905
- JEROME; Elected District Attorney by 3,525 in NYT on November 8, 1905
- SKENE'S ASSISTANT BEGINS TESTIMONY in NYT on September 3, 1910
- ACCUSER OF SKENE CALLED A PERJURER in NYT on September 6, 1910
- JEROME SAYS SKENE WAS TAMMANY'S DUPE in NYT on September 8, 1910
- JURY ACQUITS SKENE in NYT on September 9, 1910
- MRS. W. T. JEROME HURT IN AUT0 CRASH in NYT on September 26, 1921
- JEROME DIES AT 74 in NYT on February 14, 1934 (subscription required)
- MRS. W. T. JEROME, 79, DIES IN YONKERS HOME, his widow's obit, in NYT on June 1, 1934 (subscription required)

Legal offices
Preceded by Eugene A. Philbin	New York County District Attorney; 1902–1909	Succeeded by Charles S. Whitman
