= Eugene A. Philbin =

American judge (1857–1920)

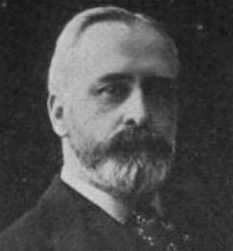

New York County District Attorney
- In office 1900–1901
- Preceded by: John R. Fellows
- Succeeded by: William T. Jerome

Personal details
- Born: Eugene Ambrose Philbin; July 24, 1857 Manhattan, New York, U.S.
- Died: March 14, 1920 (aged 62) Manhattan, New York, U.S.
- Party: Democrat
- Spouse: Jessie Holliday (m. 1887)
- Parent(s): Stephen Philbin; Eliza McGoldrick
- Education: Seton Hall College; Columbia University
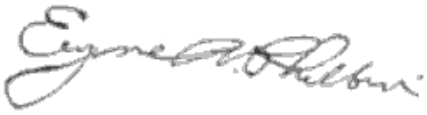
- Signature

Eugene Ambrose Philbin (July 24, 1857 – March 14, 1920) was an American lawyer and politician from New York. He was New York County District Attorney from 1900 to 1901.

== Early life ==
Eugene A. Philbin was born in New York City on July 24, 1857, the son of Stephen Philbin and Eliza (McGoldrick) Philbin.

He attended Xavier High School, and graduated from Seton Hall College. In 1883, he entered Columbia Law School, graduated in 1885.

== Career ==
After graduating from law school, he began practicing law with the firm of Ogden & Beekman. In 1894, he became the senior member of Philbin, Beekman & Menken.

In August 1899, Philbin was appointed to the New York State Board of Charities to fill the vacancy caused by the death of John Vinton Dahlgren (1869–1899, son of John A. Dahlgren).

In December 1900, Philbin was appointed by Governor Theodore Roosevelt as New York County D.A. to fill the vacancy caused by the removal from office of Asa Bird Gardiner. Philbin remained in office until the end of 1901.

In 1904, then President Roosevelt appointed him to a citizens group investigating conditions at Ellis Island. In June 1904, Seton Hall conferred an honorary degree of LL.D. on Philbin. In May 1905, he told the students at Cornell University that the corrupt New York City Police gets about one million dollars in graft per year. In October 1905, at the Democratic city convention, Philbin made the nominating speech for Mayor George B. McClellan Jr.'s re-election.

From 1904 to 1919, Philbin was an active and influential member of the Marquette League, a New York City-based organization that raised funds for Catholic missions among Native Americans in western states. Also in 1904, he became a member of the New York State Board of Regents. He served until he resigned in 1913. In April 1913, Philbin was appointed by Gov. William Sulzer to the New York Supreme Court (1st D.) to fill the vacancy caused by the resignation of Edward E. McCall. In November 1913, he was elected to succeed himself, and in 1919 was appointed to the Appellate Division.

== Personal life ==
On June 28, 1887, he married Jessie Holliday, and they had five children, including:

- Jesse Holliday Philbin (d. 1978)

In 1908, Pope Pius X made him a Knight Commander of the Order of St. Gregory the Great. He died of pneumonia at his home at 63, West 52nd Street in Manhattan.

=== Descendants ===
Through his son Jesse, he was the grandfather of Jessie Holladay Philbin, who married Ledyard Blair Clark (1917–2000), the son of Judge William Clark, in 1941.

== Sources ==
Notes

Sources

- Annual Reports of Marquette League from 1904 to 1919
- Political Graveyard
- State Court History with portrait photo

Legal offices
Preceded by Asa Bird Gardiner	New York County District Attorney; 1900–1901	Succeeded by William T. Jerome
