= Albert Rhodes (diplomat) =

American diplomat and author

Albert Rhodes (February 1, 1840 – April 5, 1894) was an American diplomat and author. He was the U.S. Consul in Jerusalem and several European cities.

== Early life ==
Rhodes was born in Pittsburgh, Pennsylvania on February 1, 1840. He was educated at the academy in Elder's Ridge, a small village in Indiana County, Pennsylvania, and entered the consular service.

== Diplomatic career ==
Rhodes served as Consul in Jerusalem in 1863-1865 where he took office on 27 January 1864, succeeding Franklin Olcott. In 1865 he resigned from the post and on 24 August 1865 was appointed consular clerk in Liverpool. On 30 June 1866 he was appointed Consul in Rotterdam, and he served briefly as Chargé d'affaires in the absence of a Minister. Rhodes served until being recalled in 1869.

He served as U.S. Commercial Agent in Rouen, France, and was then appointed U.S. Consul, where he served from 1877 to 1883. In 1881, Rhodes received the Legion of Honor from the French government.

Rhodes was then transferred to Elberfeld, Germany, where he served as U. S. consul from May 1883 until November 1885.

In retirement Rhodes resided in Paris, France and New York City.

== Career as an author ==
Albert Rhodes was a frequent contributor to magazines, including The Galaxy, McBride's, Lippincott's, The Century, and Scribner's Magazine.

Rhodes also authored several works of both fiction and nonfiction, including: Jerusalem As It Is (1865); The French at Home (1875); Monsieur at Home (1885); and Ruses de Guerre (also called A Sheep in Wolf's Clothing) (1892).

== Death ==
Rhodes died in New York City on April 5, 1894.

Diplomatic posts
Preceded by John A. Dix	U.S. Minister to the Netherlands; 1869–1869	Succeeded by Hugh Ewing
