= Bureau of Catholic Indian Missions =

The Bureau of Catholic Indian Missions is a Roman Catholic institution created in 1874 by J. Roosevelt Bayley, Archbishop of Baltimore, for the protection and promotion of Catholic mission interests among Native Americans in the United States. It is currently one of the three constituent members of the Black and Indian Mission Office.

== History ==
In 1872, the Catholic bishops of Oregon and Washington Territory sent Jean-Baptiste Brouillet to Washington as their representative to settle claims against the United States. However, the effort grew quickly to represent all U.S. Catholic dioceses with claims related to past mission work among Native Americans. Late in the following year, Archbishop Bayley appointed General Charles Ewing as Catholic Commissioner of Indian Missions to represent the dioceses, which was an appointment Brouillet and the Northwest bishops had requested nine years earlier.

Prominent among the Catholic claims were the allotment of only seven Indian reservations under the Peace Policy of President Ulysses S. Grant. Based on the past work by Catholic missionaries among those tribes, the Catholic dioceses had expected allotments to 38 of the 73 reservations. Beginning in 1869, Grant had crafted a policy of close church-state collaboration through the Board of Indian Commissioners as a means to maintain peace with the tribes and to fight the corruption in government that was rampant within the Office of Indian Affairs. In force to 1881, the policy's implementation gave Catholic missionaries exclusive religious domain to the reservations allotted to the Catholic Church, but also denied Native American Catholics on other reservations their freedom of religion to attend local Catholic churches and schools.

While addressing the Catholic mission concerns with the government, the new Office of Catholic Commissioner also built its support within the Catholic Church. It solicited aid from the bishops and laity through various appeals and through allied fundraising organizations, such as the Catholic Indian Missionary Association. The weak initial responses prompted James McMaster, editor of the New York Freeman's Journal and Catholic Register, to call for the Office’s closure, which in 1879, led to its reorganizing and renaming as the Bureau of Catholic Indian Missions. Meanwhile, in June that year, the Sacred Congregation of the Propaganda of the Holy See approved of the Catholic Bureau, and in 1884, the Third Plenary Council of Baltimore confirmed it and added a board of directors composed of bishops. The council also created a Lenten collection for Native American and African American missions under a Commission for the Catholic Missions among the Colored People and the Indians with responsibilities to support the missions and the Catholic Bureau.

While the Peace Policy remained in force, the government collaborated with Christian organizations to provide schools for Native Americans. As needed, the Commissioner of Indian Affairs approved annual contracts with religious organizations, which provided school personnel and buildings, while the government provided financial support for the tuition and boarding expenses. Under this system, the Catholic Bureau successfully expanded the number of Catholic schools for Native Americans from three with $7,000 in government contracts in 1873 to 38 with $395,000 in contracts 20 years later. This alarmed the Indian Rights Association and its supporters, who saw the Catholic native schools as part of the overall growth of U.S. Catholic schools and a threat to the culture of the United States and the principle of the separation of church and state. Consequently, they supported a national school system plan for Native American children put forth in 1889 by Thomas Jefferson Morgan, which he began to implement the following year when he took office as Commissioner of Indian Affairs. Morgan’s plan did not allow for the creation of new contracts with religiously-affiliated schools and it called for the gradual phasing out of the existing ones. Committed to saving the contract-dependent Catholic schools, Catholic Bureau director Joseph Stephan achieved some success in bypassing the Office of Indian Affairs and securing direct appropriations from the United States Congress. However, he encountered substantial opposition, which he believed was orchestrated by Morgan. Relations between them deteriorated, and in July 1891, Morgan severed all relations with the Catholic Bureau, which continued until Morgan left office two years later. Nonetheless, Morgan’s school plan remained and Congress phased out most contracts with religious schools from 1896 to 1900, which caused a number of the Catholic schools to close.

The Catholic Bureau led the effort to save as many of the now over 50 Catholic schools as possible. It promoted in-church appeals from bishops and missionaries; it launched a fundraising support organization called the Society for the Preservation of the Faith among Indian Children coupled with The Indian Sentinel magazine as a membership benefit; and it collaborated with other allied fundraising groups, such as the Marquette League. These efforts and those of the Lenten collection proved helpful. However, the bulk of the support that materialized came from Katharine Drexel, who saved many schools by donating over $100,000 per year and supplying school personnel through the Sisters of the Blessed Sacrament.

In 1896, Commissioner of Indian Affairs Daniel M. Browning reasoned that, since the government regarded native people as its wards, the Indian Office, and not the parents of Native American children, should decide which schools the children should attend. However, Catholic Bureau director William H. Ketcham notified President William McKinley that this practice violated the educational rights of parents and McKinley ordered the ruling rescinded in 1901.

In 1900, and again in 1904, the Catholic Bureau applied to use trust assets from certain tribes to educate some of their children in Catholic schools. In 1900, the Indian Office rejected the applications when opponents criticized this apparent breach of the separation of church and state. However, in 1904, President Theodore Roosevelt decided that with Native American approval, trust assets could be used for private schools and the Indian Office issued contracts to the Catholic Bureau for eight schools. When Congress denied legal prohibitions, the Indian Rights Association and its supporters brought suit against Indian Affairs Commissioner Francis E. Leupp in a case known as Quick Bear v. Leupp. Following the federal appeals system, the Supreme Court ruled on it unanimously in 1908 and found that tribal trust assets were, in fact, private and not public funds that Native Americans could spend as they wished. Consequently, from trust assets, Native American parents paid Catholic schools over $100,000 in tuition over the next 50 years.

In 1934, the Indian Reorganization Act generated extensive debate. While critics branded it as communistic and a means to de-Christianize and re-"paganize" native people, the Catholic Bureau applauded it as offering solutions to ill-conceived policies, such as allotment, and saw it as neither communistic nor hostile to Catholic missions and schools. However, the Catholic Bureau feared that its close working relationship with Collier’s Indian Office might revive the specter of anti-Catholic agitation. In a report the following year, it disclosed that 35 Catholic schools on reservations had been receiving annual government contracts. Three years earlier these schools received $188,500 in contracts, and even with the Great Depression, government support decreased just slightly the following year, which was more than offset by emergency government relief secured by the Catholic Bureau.

Because Congress had curtained domestic spending during World War II, appropriations for reservation-based Catholic schools dropped to $153,000 by 1946. However, strong post-war economic growth and active lobbying in Congress by the Catholic Bureau increased the funding for these schools to $289,000 by 1952.

In 1962, the Catholic Bureau counted 129,000 Native American Catholics served by 394 Catholic mission chapels and 9,200 children served by 54 Catholic schools on or near Indian reservations. By the next decade, tuition funding from tribal trust accounts ceased as the accounts became depleted. This prompted several schools to close and caused critical situations for a number of the 47 reservation schools. In response, Catholic Bureau director Paul Lenz founded an Association of Catholic Indian Schools, which in June 1983, coordinated plans to maintain the schools through direct mail campaigns, personal appeals and wills of request.

After Pope Paul VI restored the permanent deaconate in 1967, the ranks of deacons began to include Native Americans. However, some Native deaconate students had difficulties in adjusting to classroom settings and textbooks. So in 1986, the Catholic Bureau financed a redesigned textbook series titled, Builders of the New Earth: The Formation of Deacons and Lay Ministers by the staff of the Sioux Spiritual Center of the Rapid City diocese. Since then, the series has been reprinted multiple times for the training of Native American deacons in the United States and Canada.

In 1977, a U.S. bishops’ statement urged the United States government to develop policies to provide greater justice for Native Americans. Later that year the Catholic Bureau followed by testifying in support of the American Indian Religious Freedom Act, which Congress enacted in 1978. Also in 1977, the Catholic Bureau, in cooperation with the Commission for the Catholic Missions among the Colored People and the Indians, began to support the Tekakwitha Conference, which then reorganized from an association of Northern Plains Catholic missionaries into one representing Native American Catholics. Meanwhile, the Catholic Bureau began to promote the canonization cause of its namesake, Kateri Tekakwitha, a 17th-century Mohawk convert.

In 1980, the offices of the Catholic Bureau, which have been shared with the Commission since 1935, became known as the Black and Indian Mission office. During the following year, the United States Catholic Conference Ad-Hoc Committee on National Collections attempted to incorporate the Commission’s Black and Indian Mission collection within a consolidated program of national collections administered by the Catholic Conference. This would have ended the independence of the Catholic Bureau as well as the Commission and the Catholic Negro-American Mission Board. Lenz objected and successfully opposed the consolidation as an attack on the interests of black and Native American Catholics. Thereafter he continued to build the collection, which surpassed seven million dollars in 1994.

The Catholic Bureau also succeeded in identifying two high achieving priests with Native American ancestry as prospects for the Catholic Church hierarchy. In 1986, the Holy See named Donald E. Pelotte as coadjutor Bishop of Gallup, and in 1988, it named Charles J. Chaput as Bishop of Rapid City (presently Archbishop of Philadelphia).

== Fundraising organizations ==
The Catholic Church used several fundraising organizations to support its mission work worldwide, a number of which, at least in part, supported missions among Native Americans in the United States and collaborated with the Catholic Bureau. Some organizations were created exclusively for this purpose with the Catholic Bureau engaged in their creation.

- Catholic Indian Missionary Association (1875–1887)

Catholic lay women organized the Association with chapters in Washington, D.C., Philadelphia, St. Louis, and other major U.S. cities. Brouillet served as its director-treasurer and Ellen Ewing Sherman served as its principal organizer and fundraiser. Through its Catholic Indian Mission Fund, it raised $48,700 in donations and bequests for the Catholic Bureau and reservation-based Catholic missions and schools. $6,000 was the most raised in a single year and it ceased when the Catholic Bureau succeeded in acquiring government contracts for the Catholic schools.

- Commission for the Catholic Missions among the Colored People and the Indians (1884-)
- Society for the Preservation of the Faith among Indian Children (1902–1922)

Ketcham launched the Society in conjunction with The Indian Sentinel magazine on Catholic missions and Native Americans. The U.S. bishops approved of the Society and in 1908, Pope Pius X added his commendation. Ketcham served as president and members paid $.25 per year and received the magazine in English (or German to 1918). The Society raised $21,000 and 26,000 in 1902 and 1903 respectively with exceptional support from Catholic parishes and schools in Cleveland and Philadelphia, where parish chapters were created. Membership certificates were available in seven different languages including German and Lakota.

- Marquette League for Catholic Indian Missions (1904–1991)

== Catholic Commissioners ==
- General Charles Ewing (1874–1883)
- Captain John Mullan (1883–1884)

== Directors ==
- John-Baptiste Brouillet (1879–1884)
- Joseph Stephan (1885–1901)
- William H. Ketcham (1901–1921)
- William Hughes (1921–1935)
- John Tennelly (1935–1976); member, Society of St. Sulpice
- Paul Lenz (1976–2007)
- Wayne Paysse (2007-2015)
- Maurice Henry Sands (2015-)

== Publications ==
The Bureau regularly published promotional pamphlets and periodicals, which raised funds for Catholic missions and schools in the United States and chronicled their activities.

- Annals of Catholic Indian Missions in America, (1877–1881)
- The Bureau of Catholic Indian Missions, 1874 to 1895, (1895)
- The Indian Sentinel, (1902–1962)
- Newsletter, (1977–2009)
- Bureau of Catholic Indian Missions, Established 1874... Over a Century of Service, (1993?)
- The Sentinel, (2009-)

== See also ==
- Lists of United States Supreme Court cases; Quick Bear v. Leupp in volume 210

== Archival collections ==
Marquette University Special Collections and University Archives serves as the archival repository for the Catholic Bureau and its affiliated institutions, the Commission for the Catholic Missions among the Colored People and the Indians and the Catholic Negro-American Mission Board. Collectively, these institutions comprise the Black and Indian Mission office. However, the archival records of the institutions are known as the Bureau of Catholic Indian Missions Records after the oldest of the three institutions, which has generated the bulk of the archival records. Marquette University provides selected images from the Catholic Bureau records and The Indian Sentinel as separate online digital collections.
