= Roeliff Brinkerhoff =

American historian

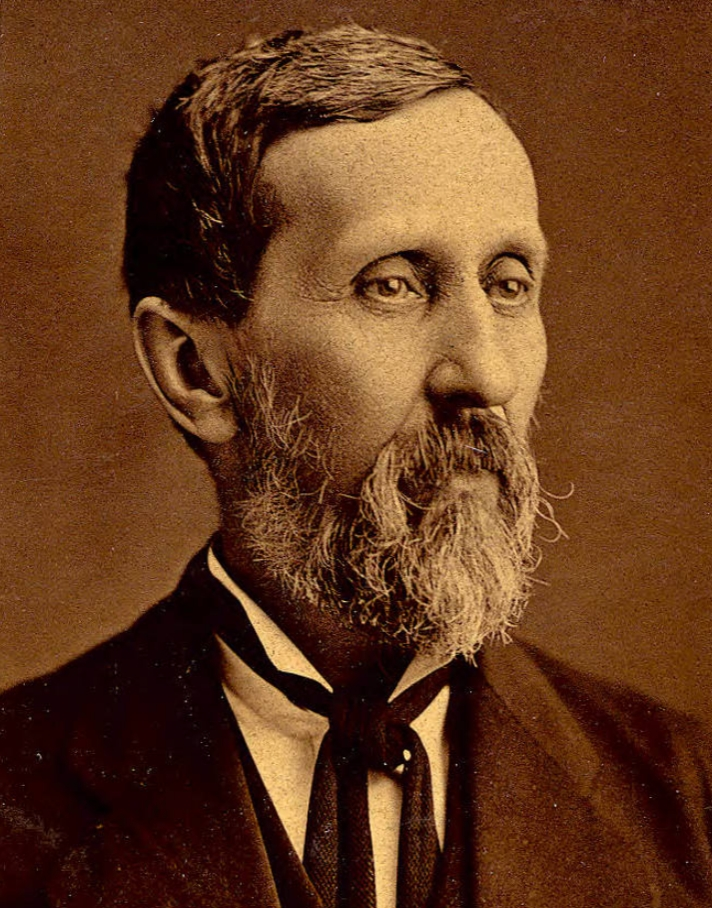
- Brevet Brigadier General Roeliff Brinkerhoff
- Born: June 28, 1828; Owasco, New York, U.S.
- Died: June 4, 1911 (aged 82); Mansfield, Ohio, U.S.
- Military career
- Allegiance: United States of America
- Service years: 1861-1866
- Rank: Colonel; Brevet Brigadier General
- Conflicts: American Civil War; Capture of Nashville; Siege of Corinth
- Other work: Lawyer, Newspaper Editor, Bank President, Founder and President of the Ohio Historical Society

Roeliff Brinkerhoff (June 28, 1828 – June 4, 1911) was a lawyer, editor and owner of the Mansfield Herald, and later a bank president. He was a quartermaster and supply officer in the Union Army during the American Civil War, rising to the rank of colonel. In recognition of his service, he was nominated in 1866 and confirmed in 1867 for appointment to the grade of brevet brigadier general of volunteers. His work, "The Volunteer Quartermaster" was considered the definitive text on military logistics and transportation from the Civil War until World War I. He also founded the Ohio Historical Society and succeeded former President Rutherford B. Hayes as president of the American National Prison Congress.

== Early life and career ==
Roeliff (often mistakenly known as 'Ruloff') was born in Owasco, Cayuga County, New York. His parents were Joris R. “George” (1785-1849) and Jacomyntje Bevier Brinkerhoff (1794-1830), of Dutch descent. He was also of French Huguenot descent and was a direct descendant of Louis DuBois. At the age of sixteen, he became a teacher in his native town, while at eighteen he was in charge of a school near Hendersonville, Tennessee. The following year he was the tutor in the family of Andrew Jackson Jr. before moving to Mansfield, Ohio, to study law with his relative Jacob Brinkerhoff. He was admitted to the bar in 1852, and remained in active practice from that time until after the outbreak of hostilities during the American Civil War. He also served as editor the Mansfield Herald newspaper. Brinkerhoff was married on February 3, 1852, to Mary Lake Bentley, of Mansfield, a granddaughter of General Robert Bentley, a general in the Ohio militia in the War of 1812, later a lawyer, judge and state senator. They had two sons and two daughters.

A firm believer in prison and asylum reform, he was at first a free-soil Democrat, then a Republican, and then, following the unsuccessful Liberal Republican Party movement of 1872, a Democrat once more; he was described as a "Jeffersonian democrat, a believer in free trade, hard money, home rule, and the non-interference principles of government generally."

== Civil War ==
He joined the army in September 1861 as a first lieutenant and regimental quartermaster of the 64th Ohio Infantry. He was known by some accounts as the first officer to join the "Sherman Brigade" which was raised under the direction of Ohio Senator John Sherman. In December 1861, he was assigned to the depot at Bardstown, Kentucky. Following the capture of Nashville, he was placed in charge of the land and river transportation in that city and after the Battle of Shiloh, he was ordered to the front and placed in charge of the field transportation of the Army of the Ohio.

It was following the capture of Corinth that he returned home on sick leave and when he had sufficiently recovered he was ordered to Maine as Chief Quartermaster of the state, where he quickly became friends with Congressman James G. Blaine. He was then transferred to Pittsburgh, Pennsylvania, and placed in charge of transportation and army stores for the Department of the Susquehanna, and then to Washington D.C. as post quartermaster until June, 1865, when he was made a Colonel and inspector of the quartermaster's department. He was retained on duty at the war office with Secretary of War Edwin Stanton until November, when he was ordered to Cincinnati as Chief Quartermaster of the Department of the Ohio.

At his own request, Brinkerhoff was mustered out of the volunteers on September 30, 1866. In recognition of Brinkerhoff's service, on December 11, 1866, President Andrew Johnson nominated Brinkerhoff for appointment to the grade of brevet brigadier general to rank from September 20, 1866, and the U.S. Senate confirmed the appointment on February 6, 1867. He was the author of a volume entitled, "The Volunteer Quartermaster," a treatise which was considered the standard guide for the officers and employees of the quartermaster's department up until the First World War.

== Postbellum career ==
Brinkerhoff was the intimate friend of many nationally prominent figures including Salmon P. Chase, James G. Blaine, James A. Garfield and Rutherford B. Hayes. In 1873, he became President of the Mansfield Savings Bank, and in 1878 was appointed a member of the board of state charities and continued in that position under different administrations serving eleven terms over a period of thirty years.

Blaine had initially promised Brinkerhoff an appointment as U.S. Minister to Holland, but schemed to have the sitting Ambassador Hugh Ewing replaced with his brother Charles Ewing, and there is no evidence that Blaine ever actually presented Brinkerhoff's name to the President, although both Senator John Sherman and General and Congressman John Beatty claim that Blaine had promised them to do so.

He showcased his compassion and liberal idealism when he traded on his political connections to abolish the use of mechanical restraints in treatments of the insane. Although his work was initially deemed "Brinkerhoff's Folly" by the press, his work led to the Toledo hospital system becoming the model asylum in the United States. He was selected as a member of the commission which selected the plans for its construction. He was one of the earliest American advocates of the cottage system, and understood that public opinion demanded reform and advancement.

In 1875, Brinkerhoff founded the Ohio State Archaeological and Historical Society at his home, whose first president was Senator Allen G. Thurman, followed by Rutherford B. Hayes, and later himself Brinkerhoff upon Hayes' death. He was soon named President Emeritus of the organization which exists to this day.

Through the society he was able to secure legislation and funding for the Ohio Monument at Jefferson Park, in Chicago. In a speech delivered before the legislature, he stated that:

I remembered Greece and Palestine, and my speech was ready, for in men of renown Ohio was peerless among the states. At 11 o'clock when my turn came I amplified my idea and wound up with the suggestion that Ohio should be represented at the fair by a group of statuary in the center of which should be a noble matron representing Ohio, and all around her should be such children as Grant, Sherman, Sheridan, Chase, Stanton and Garfield; and then upon the pedestal should be engraved the proud utterance of Cornelia the Mother of the Gracchi, 'These are my jewels.' A resolution was unanimously adopted recommending the legislature to adopt the suggestion and appropriate the funds necessary to put it in granite bronze.

— General Roeliff Brinkerhoff

When the Ohio monument was dedicated at Jefferson Park, in Chicago, September 14, 1893, General Brinkerhoff delivered one of the principal addresses.

== See also ==
- List of American Civil War brevet generals (Union)

== Bibliography ==
- Randall, Emilius Oviatt (1850-1919): General Roeliff Brinkerhoff and General Brinkerhoff, Ohio Archæological and Historical Society Publications: Volume 20 [1911], pp. 353–367, 466–467.
