= Samuel Beatty (general) =

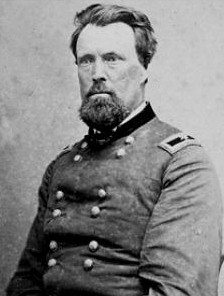
- Samuel Beatty
- Born: December 16, 1820; Mifflin County, Pennsylvania, U.S.
- Died: May 26, 1885 (aged 64); Jackson Township, Stark County, Ohio, U.S.
- Burial place: Massillon City Cemetery; Massillon, Ohio, U.S.
- Military career
- Allegiance: United States of America; Union
- Branch: United States Army; Union Army
- Service years: 1846–1848; 1861–1865
- Rank: Brigadier General; Brevet Major General
- Unit: 3rd Ohio Volunteers
- Commands: 19th Ohio Infantry; 11th Brigade, 5th Division, II Corps; 3rd Division, Army of the Cumberland (temporary); 3rd Brigade, 3rd Division, IV Corps; 3rd Division, IV Corps (temporary)
- Conflicts: Mexican–American War; American Civil War; Battle of Rich Mountain; Battle of Shiloh; Battle of Perryville; Battle of Stones River; Battle of Chickamauga; Battle of Nashville

Samuel Beatty (December 16, 1820 – May 26, 1885) was an American soldier, sheriff, and farmer from Ohio. He was a brigadier general in the Union Army during the American Civil War. In 1866, he was awarded the brevet grade of major general of volunteers.

== Early life and career ==
Beatty was born in Mifflin County, Pennsylvania in 1820 but was raised on a farm in Stark County, Ohio. Beatty was appointed First Lieutenant in Company K, 3rd Ohio Volunteer Infantry on 25 June 1846 at Cincinnati, Ohio, for service during the Mexican–American War. The regiment was commanded by Colonel Samuel R. Curtis and spent several months guarding the Mexican border near Matamoras. The 3rd Ohio was attached to Zachary Taylor's division in the Army of the Rio Grande commanded by General Winfield Scott. The 3rd Ohio took part in mopping up operations around Monterrey and protecting supply convoys from Mexican irregulars. The 3rd Ohio was relieved from duty on 18 May 1847 and mustered out of service at New Orleans, Louisiana from 18–24 June 1847.

Beatty returned to his family farm in Jackson Township, Stark County, Ohio, after discharge. He was elected Sheriff of Stark County in 1857 and won reelection in 1859.

== Civil War service ==
When the Civil War erupted, Samuel Beatty helped form a volunteer unit that mustered in as Company A of the 19th Ohio Infantry—the "Canton Light Guards." Beatty was elected as the regiment's first colonel on 29 May 1861 After initial organization and training at the local fairgrounds, the regiment was transported to Camp Chase in Columbus, Ohio, for additional drilling. Beatty led the 19th Ohio in a series of battles in western Virginia, including the Battle of Rich Mountain - where his good conduct was cited in General William Rosecrans' official report. The 19th Ohio was originally mustered for only ninety days so returned to Ohio to muster out in August 1861.

Beatty and the 19th Ohio (3 years) organized in September 1861 and was attached to the 11th Brigade, Army of the Ohio in December 1861. Beatty commanded a brigade in the Army of the Ohio during the Battle of Shiloh in April 1862, and the subsequent Corinth campaign and Battle of Perryville in Kentucky in September 1862. His service was recognized by a promotion to brigadier general of volunteers on 29 November 1862.

At the Battle of Stones River, Beatty commanded a brigade in Brig. Gen. Horatio Van Cleve's division of Maj. Gen. Thomas L. Crittenden's left wing. Van Cleave was wounded during fighting on the first day, so Beatty commanded the division during the remainder of the battle. During the pivotal fighting late on 2 January 1863, Beatty rallied his division after they were driven back by an attack by the division commanded by John C. Breckinridge. Beatty's division ultimately defeated Breckenridge along with the massed fires of Federal artillery gathered by Crittenden's artillery chief, Captain John Mendenhall.

Beatty resumed command of his old brigade which was redesignated 1st Brigade of Van Cleve's 3rd Division, Major General Thomas Crittenden's XXI Army Corps, Army of the Cumberland, commanded by Major General George H. Thomas. Beatty led his brigade through the middle Tennessee campaign that ended with the Battle of Chickamauga in September 1863. Beatty's brigade fought well during the first and second day until it was caught up in the collapse of the Union line. Beatty afterwards received the commendation of XXI Corps commander Thomas L. Crittenden, who wrote, "With pride I mention the name of Brig. Gen. Samuel Beatty for his conduct on this occasion."

Beatty's brigade was reorganized as 3rd Brigade, Third Division, under Brigadier General Thomas J. Wood, IV Corps (Major General Gordon Granger), Army of the Cumberland. Beatty's brigade participated in the preliminary battle for Orchard Knob on 23 November 1863, and the pivotal Battle of Missionary Ridge on 25 November 1863. After preliminary attacks by General William T. Sherman at Tunnel Hill failed, General Ulysses S. Grant ordered the Army of the Cumberland to advance on the base of Missionary Ridge. Instead, the junior officers of the Army of the Cumberland, confused by conflicting orders, continued their advance up Missionary Ridge. The men of Wood's division and Beatty's brigade were among the first Federal soldiers to gain the crest of Missionary Ridge, and played a major role in routing the Confederate Army of Tennessee from their positions. Beatty afterwards claimed to have captured eight pieces of artillery with limbers and caisson, 200 small arms, 176 prisoners and the commander and colors of the 42nd Alabama.

Beatty continued on to command the 3rd Brigade, Third Division (Wood), IV Corps, commanded by Major General Oliver Otis Howard, of the Army of the Cumberland, during the Atlanta campaign of 1864. General Beatty continued on in brigade command during the Franklin–Nashville campaign of September–December 1864. Beatty was elevated to command Wood's division, IV Corps, Army of the Cumberland prior to the Battle of Nashville. Beatty's division took part in the diversionary attack on Peach Orchard Hill, setting the stage for the decisive attack on Shy's Hill that crushed the left flank of the Army of Tennessee. By nomination of President Andrew Johnson on January 13, 1866 and confirmation by the U.S. Senate on March 12, 1866, he was retroactively awarded the brevet grade of major general of volunteers, to rank from March 13, 1865, for his leadership of the Third Division, IV Corps, Army of the Cumberland during the Nashville campaign. This brevet promotion made him the highest ranking Union Army officer from Stark County.

Beatty was mustered out of the volunteer service on January 15, 1866.

== Postbellum career ==
After the war, Beatty returned to Stark County and farmed in Jackson Township. He died at home on 26 May 1885 and was buried in the City Cemetery in Massillon, Ohio.

Original farmhouse located at 8903 Beatty ST NW MASSILLON, OH 44646. Later deconstructed and put into storage.

== See also ==
- List of American Civil War generals (Union)
- List of Ohio's American Civil War generals
- Ohio in the American Civil War
