= 19th Ohio Infantry Regiment =

- 19th Detachment, Ohio Infanctry, Genl. S. Beatty's Brigade. 1: P.M. to 7: P.M. September 20, 1863 - Snodgrass Hill
- Active: April 27, 1861, to August 31, 1861 (3 months); September 25, 1861, to October 24, 1865 (3 years)
- Country: United States
- Allegiance: Union
- Branch: Union Army
- Type: Infantry
- Engagements: Battle of Rich Mountain; Battle of Shiloh; Siege of Corinth; Battle of Perryville; Battle of Stones River; Tullahoma Campaign; Battle of Chickamauga; Siege of Chattanooga; Battle of Missionary Ridge; Atlanta campaign; Battle of Kennesaw Mountain; Battle of Peachtree Creek; Siege of Atlanta; Battle of Jonesboro; Battle of Lovejoy's Station; Second Battle of Franklin; Battle of Nashville

The 19th Ohio Infantry Regiment was an infantry regiment in the Union Army during the American Civil War.

== Service ==
=== Three-months regiment ===
The 19th Ohio Infantry Regiment organized at Cleveland, Ohio, in April and May 1861 in response to President Lincoln's call for 75,000 volunteers. The regiment moved to Columbus, Ohio, on May 27 and mustered in on May 29, to date from April 27, 1861, under the command of Colonel Samuel Beatty.

Companies A and B moved to Bellaire, Ohio, on May 27, and guard duty there until June 3, and at Glover's Gap and Manington until June 20. The regiment at Zainesville until June 20. Moved to Parkersburg, W. Va., June 20–23. Attached to Rosecran's Brigade, Army of West Virginia. Moved to Clarksburg June 25. March to Buckhannon June 29–30. Occupation of Buckhannon June 30. Campaign in West Virginia July 6–17. Battle of Rich Mountain July 11.

The regiment moved to Columbus July 23–27 and mustered out by companies: A, August 27; B and C, August 29; D, August 30; E, August 28; F, August 30; G, August 31; H, August 18; I, August 30; and K, August 31, 1861.

=== Three-years regiment ===
The 19th Ohio Infantry was reorganized at Alliance, Ohio and mustered in for three years service on September 25, 1861, under the command of Colonel Charles Frederick Manderson. The regiment was recruited in the same counties as the three-months regiment.

The regiment was attached to 11th Brigade, Army of the Ohio, to December 1861. 11th Brigade, 1st Division, Army of the Ohio, to March 1862. 11th Brigade, 5th Division, Army of the Ohio, to September 1862. 11th Brigade, 5th Division, II Corps, Army of the Ohio, to November 1862. 1st Brigade, 3rd Division, Left Wing, XIV Corps, Army of the Cumberland, to January 1863. 1st Brigade, 3rd Division, XXI Corps, Army of the Cumberland, to October 1863. 3rd Brigade, 3rd Division, IV Corps, to June 1865. 2nd Brigade, 3rd Division, IV Corps, to August 1865. Department of Texas, to October 1865.

The 19th Ohio Infantry mustered out of service at San Antonio, Texas, on October 24, 1865.

== Detailed service ==
Moved to Camp Dennison, Ohio, November 6, thence to Louisville, Ky., November 16. Duty at Camp Jenkins, Louisville, Lebanon, Renick's Creek, Jamestown and Greasy Creek until February 1862. March to Nashville, Tenn., February 15-March 8, and to Savannah, Tenn., March 18-April 6. Battle of Shiloh, Tenn., April 6–7, Advance on and siege of Corinth, Miss., April 29-May 30. Pursuit to Booneville May 31-June 6. Buell's Campaign in northern Alabama and middle Tennessee June to August. March to Battle Creek, Ala., and duty there until August 21. March to Louisville, Ky., in pursuit of Bragg August 21-September 26. Pursuit of Bragg into Kentucky October 1–15. Battle of Perryville, Ky., October 8 (reserve). March to Nashville, Tenn., October 16-November 7, and duty there until December 26. Advance on Murfreesboro, Tenn., December 26–30. Battle of Stones River December 30–31, 1862 and January 1–3, 1863. Duty at Murfreesboro until June. Tullahoma Campaign June 22-July 7. Liberty Gap June 22–24. At McMinnville until August 16. Passage of the Cumberland Mountains and Tennessee River and Chickamauga Campaign August 16-September 22. Battle of Chickamauga September 19–20. Siege of Chattanooga, Tenn., September 24-November 23. Chattanooga-Ringgold Campaign November 23–27. Orchard Knob November 23–24. Missionary Ridge November 25. Pursuit to Graysville November 26–27. March to relief of Knoxville November 28-December 8. Operations in eastern Tennessee December 1863 to April 1864. Regiment reenlisted January 1, 1864. Atlanta Campaign May l-September 8, Duty at Parker's Gap May 6–18. Advance to the Etowah May 18–23. Cassville May 19. Advance on Dallas May 22–25. Operations on Pumpkin Vine Creek and battles about Dallas, New Hope Church and Allatoona Hills May 25-June 5. Pickett's Mills May 27. Operations about Marietta and against Kennesaw Mountain June 10-July 2. Pine Mountain June 11–14. Lost Mountain June 15–17. Assault on Kennesaw June 27. Ruff's Station July 4. Chattahoochie River July 5–17. Peachtree Creek July 19–20. Siege of Atlanta July 22-August 25. Flank movement on Jonesboro August 25–30. Battle of Jonesboro August 31-September 1. Lovejoy's Station September 2–6. Operations against Hood, in northern Georgia and northern Alabama September 29-November 3. Nashville Campaign November–December. Columbia, Duck River, November 24–27. Battle of Franklin November 30. Battle of Nashville December 15–16. Pursuit of Hood to the Tennessee River December 17–28. Moved to Huntsville, Ala., and duty there until March 1865. Expedition from Whitesburg February 17. Operations in eastern Tennessee March 15-April 22. Duty at Nashville until June. Moved to New Orleans, La., June 16, thence to Texas. Duty at Green Lake until September 11, and at San Antonio until October 21.

== Casualties ==
The regiment lost a total of 279 men during service; 7 officers and 104 enlisted men killed or mortally wounded, 6 officers and 162 enlisted men died of disease.

== Commanders ==
- Colonel Samuel Beatty
- Colonel Charles Frederick Manderson
- Lieutenant Colonel E. W. Hollingsworth - commanded at the battle of Perryville
- Lieutenant Colonel Henry G. Stratton - commanded at the battles of Chickamauga and Nashville

== See also ==
- List of Ohio Civil War units
- Ohio in the Civil War
