= Commission for the Catholic Missions among the Colored People and the Indians =

U.S. Roman Catholic institution

The Commission for the Catholic Missions among the Colored People and the Indians is a U.S. Roman Catholic institution that administers a national annual appeal in support of Catholic mission work.

== History ==
In 1884 at the Third Plenary Council of Baltimore, the U.S. Catholic bishops decreed the establishment of a national appeal to benefit mission work among African Americans and American Indian and the Bureau of Catholic Indian Missions. They further decreed that all parishes conduct the appeal on the first Sunday in Lent and that a commission of three bishops without Indian missions in their dioceses administer its acquisition and allocation of funds.

The commission, based in Washington, D.C., initiated the appeal in 1887, which has been held annually ever since and renamed the Black and Indian mission collection in 1980. The appeal raised its first $1,000,000 in one year in 1952; its first $5,000,000 in one year in 1985; and its first $9,000,000 in one year in 2005.

From 1887 to 1944, due to the paucity of alternative domestic funding sources for Catholic mission activities, the Commission expanded its focus to provide intermittent support to certain missions associated with and within the United States. Most notably, it extended funding to the Bahamas, Guam, Haiti, the Philippines (among the Igorot people) and in Texas (among Mexican Americans). To support new directions in multicultural ministries, the commission began to extend funding to the Tekakwitha Conference in 1977, which became an organization of Native American Catholics primarily from among aboriginal peoples in Canada as well as the United States, and to the National Black Catholic Congress in 1988.

Nonetheless, demands for funds have long outpaced the commission's ability to raise them. In 1907, the hierarchy established the Catholic Board for Mission Work among the Colored People (now the Catholic Negro-American Mission Board) to create a second funding stream to support Catholic missions in the Black community. Since 1990, the Commission narrowed its funding focus and not funded missions for Black and Native Americans who immigrated to the United States since the mid-20th century, which has affected U.S. Haitian and Mayan communities.

In 1981, the United States Catholic Conference Ad Hoc Committee on National Collections attempted to end the independence of the Lenten appeal and fold it into a consolidated program of national collections. Monsignor Paul Lenz, secretary-treasurer of the Lenten appeal and director of the Bureau of Catholic Indian Missions, objected and successfully opposed the consolidation, which would have ended the Bureau's independence.

== See also ==
- Marquette University Special Collections and University Archives
