= SS Douglas Mawson =

SS Douglas Mawson was an Australian coastal steamer that was lost in the Gulf of Carpentaria around 28 March 1923 along with 20 passengers and crew.

== History ==
Cape York, Queensland
1 Burketown
2 Normanton
3 (Lower) Coen River
4 Thursday Island
5 Prince of Wales Island

SS Douglas Mawson was a wooden-hulled vessel of 141 feet (43 m) length and speed 8 knots (15 km/h; 9.2 mph), built in 1914.

One of her first duties was weekly trips under Captain Donovan to Nambucca Heads, for which she was ideally suited, being of particularly light draught, so better able to negotiate the Nambucca River bar.

In 1916 under Captain Chellow she was used by Blakiston and Co. to carry cement from Geelong to Tasmania.

She was taken over by John Burke and Son, for their Gulf of Carpentaria trade – a poor choice of vessel, according to one correspondent to the Brisbane Daily Mail in 1923.

SS Douglas Mawson left Burketown with 20 persons — 13 crew and seven passengers — on board on 26 March 1923 for Thursday Island under captain George Finch Tune, but never arrived. It was believed to have encountered a cyclonic storm in the Gulf of Carpentaria. The only passengers recorded were Mr and Mrs Willett and their five children, who boarded the ship at Normanton. Willett's eldest daughter, Alice May Willett was 14 years old; the youngest, Elizabeth, was four. The crew consisted of first mate Richard Shewring, engineer R. D. Thompson and donkeyman John Fraser, firemen and drivers John Tully and Hector B. Dinte, cook and steward Robert Nixon, seamen James Laird, Archie McNeill, Christian Nielsen or Nielson, William Rowe, William Nugent, and Maurice Giese.

Her last reported observation was by Aboriginal people from the beach near the Coen River on the night of 28 March.

On 18 May 1923 some wreckage, thought to come from the Mawson, but since disproved, was found on Prince of Wales Island.

== Controversy ==
Reports were received from Arnhem Land Aboriginal people that a party of survivors landed south of Cape Arnheim and that two white women had been captured and were still living with local people. Conjectures, rife at the time, of male survivors being eaten and two women (Mrs Willett and her eldest daughter) taken captive based on reports from Aboriginal people on Melville Bay, Cape Arnheim, and Caledon Bay, 500 km (310 mi) to the west, were dismissed by Captain Wilkins. Rev. James Watson, a Methodist missioner in the area, also considered the story unlikely, but in September 1924, the Women's League of New South Wales demanded the federal government immediately send out a rescue party.
