= Splitlog Church =

Historic church in Oklahoma, United States

- U.S. National Register of Historic Places
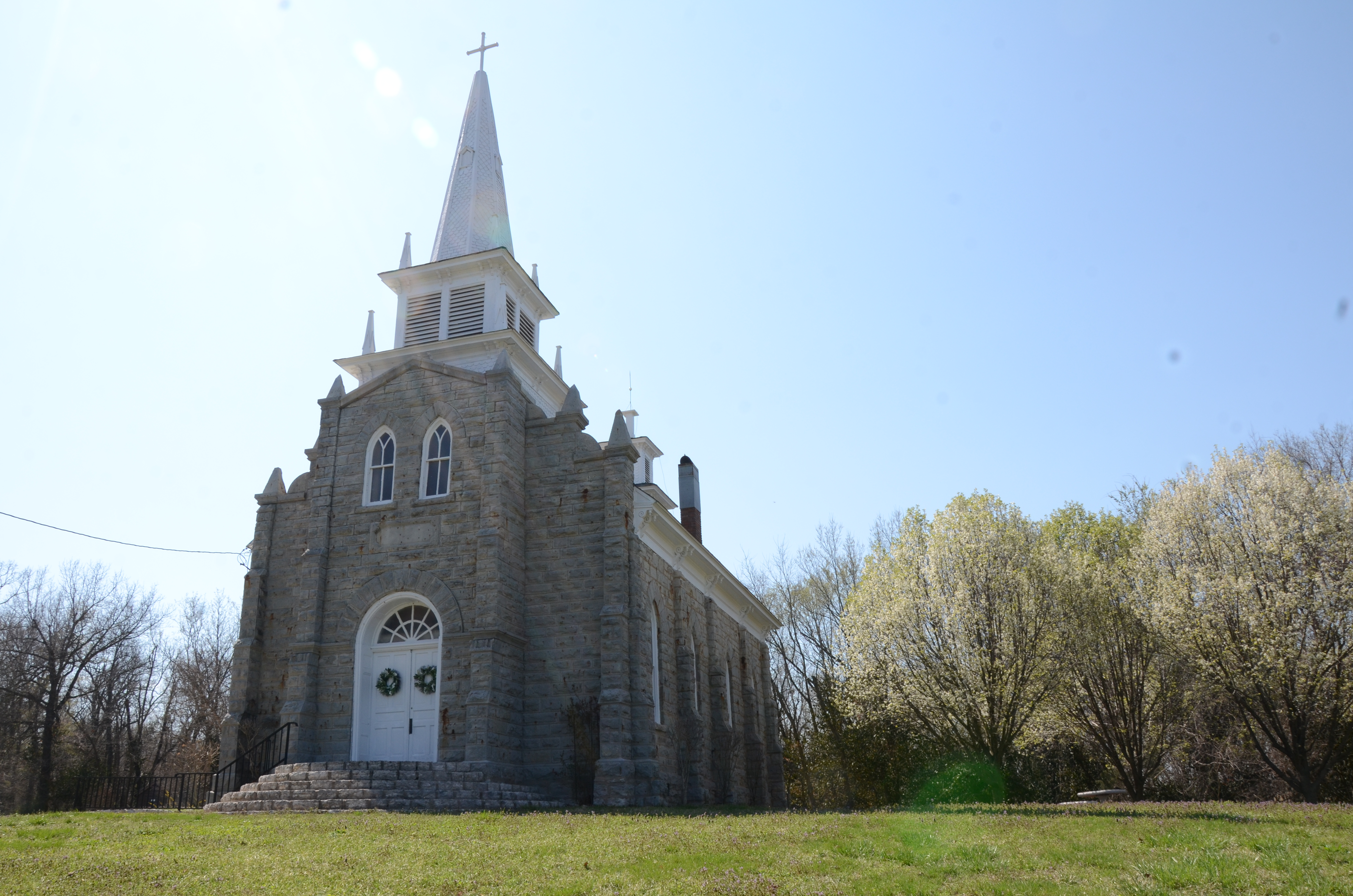
- Splitlog Church, NE View

- Location within Oklahoma Location within the United States
- Nearest city: Grove, Oklahoma
- Coordinates: 36.6335°N 94.6797°W
- Area: 0.5 acres (0.20 ha)
- Built: 1893
- Built by: Splitlog, Mathias
- NRHP reference No.: 72001061
- Added to NRHP: October 26, 1972

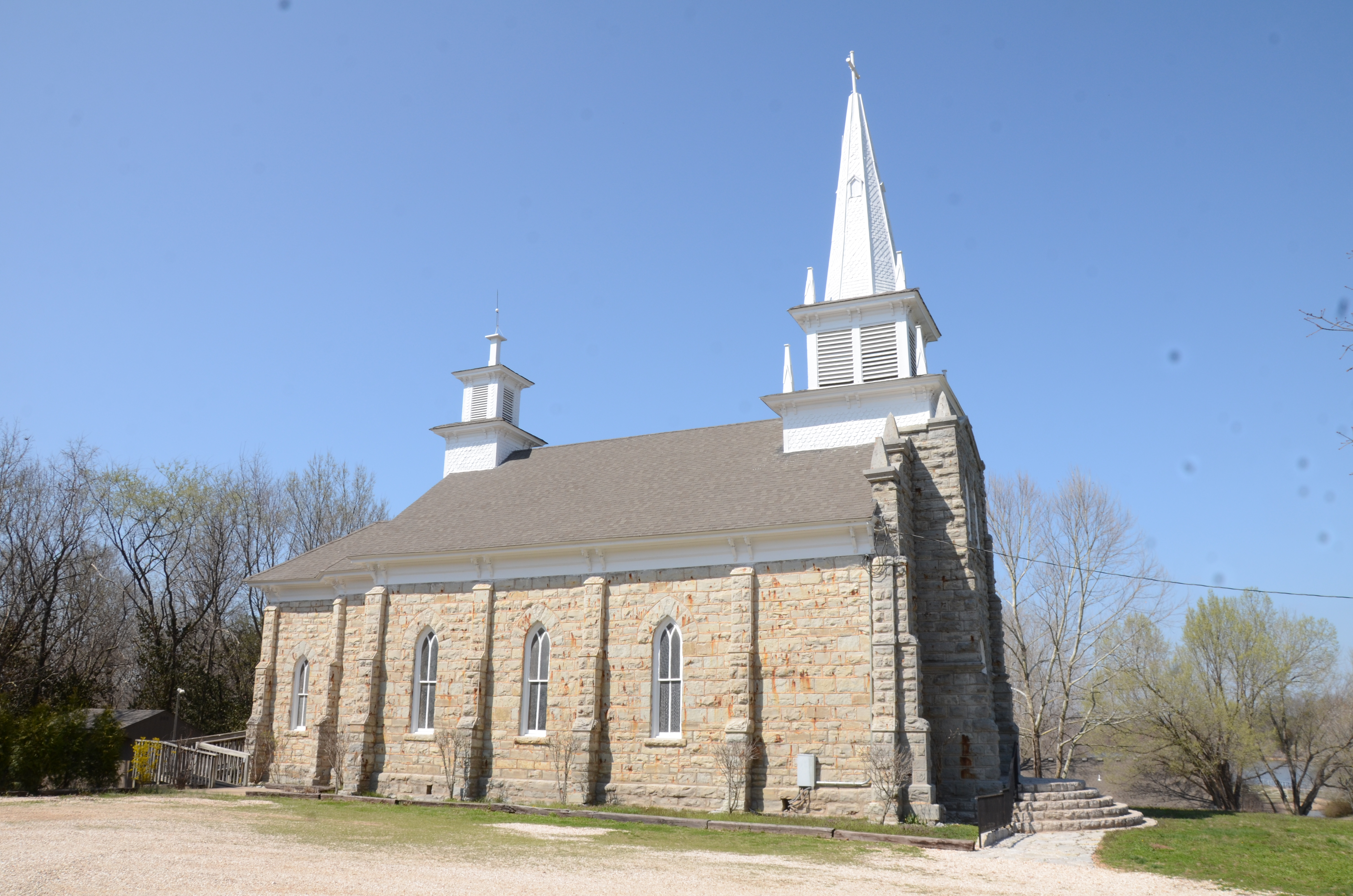
Splitlog Church, south side

Splitlog Church (also known as Cayuga Mission Church) is a historic church building in the unincorporated community of Cayuga, Oklahoma, near Grove, Oklahoma. It is named for Mathias and Eliza Splitlog, who built the church and founded Cayuga, which was an industrial center in the late 1880s. The building was added to the National Register of Historic Places in 1972 and still serves as a church.

== Features ==
=== Exterior ===
The church building is approximately 50 feet (15 m) long by 30 feet (9.1 m) wide and is constructed of native limestone from the nearby Boone Formation. It has a tall steeple above the front entrance with a Belfry (architecture) that held a 1,600 pound (726 kg) bronze bell that was cast in Belgium, shipped to Neosho, Missouri, and then hauled by his son Henry Splitlog the 24 miles (39 km) from Neosho to Cayuga. A smaller belfry toward the rear of the building held a second, smaller bell.

The roof is high and steeply sloped. Limestone steps lead to the front entrance, which has plain wooden double doors, and has an arch adorned with fifteen Indian symbols. The meaning of the symbols is unknown.

=== Interior ===
Inside, the building has imported wood, much of which has been carved very ornately. All windows are arched and had stained glass. Starting at the east end of the altar, each arched window has one letter of the designer's surname carved above it. Thus, running down the right side of the nave, across the back, and returning up the left, the carvings form the name "Splitlog".

The organ that Splitlog had ordered for the choir loft could not be delivered until the church was nearly complete. The building had water from the water system Splitlog built for the town, but the furnace to provide steam heat to parishioners was not completed before his death.

In 1998, a 6-foot (1.8-meter) mural was discovered in the church; it depicts Delaware County, Oklahoma and is signed Victoria L. Morell, 1946.

=== Removed elements ===
The church has a basement, and there was a two-room building behind the church that served as a small residence and engine house. A tunnel connected the church basement to the other building, for the priest's convenience.

In the cornerstone was a copper can about the size of a cigar box, with pictures of Eliza and Mathias Splitlog, their biography, one of each of the coins used at that time, and some stamps. The original windows were stained glass, that had cost $19,000 when it was built (equivalent to about $706,500 in 2024). In 1925, vandals exploded dynamite in the walls, stealing the box of coins and breaking the windows.

When the Catholic Church sold the building to the Methodist Church, they removed the altar and confessional. The Methodists installed a pulpit. At that time, the Catholic Church also removed the large Belgian bell from the front steeple and sent it to St. Catherine's Church in Nowata, Oklahoma. Later, the Splitlogs' grandson Chief Grover Splitlog negotiated with the Catholic Bishop of Oklahoma Eugene J. McGuinness to return the bell, and for a while it was displayed on the groundskeeper's yard.

== History ==
Mathias and Eliza Splitlog and their children were forcibly moved from their original homes in Canada and Ohio, to the Wyandotte Purchase in Kansas Territory (today's Kansas City, Kansas), and from there to Indian Territory (today's Oklahoma). Here they founded the Cayuga town and industrial center, most of which is now gone except this church and the adjoining cemetery.

Mathias was Cayuga and French by birth and he grew up among the Wyandot people. Eliza was Wyandot. When they moved to Oklahoma, Mathias Splitlog met with the Seneca Chief George Spicer about the move, and Spicer agreed to adopt the Splitlogs into the Seneca tribe, so they could live in the area—at that time, the Senecas held their land in severalty and were not allowed to sell any land.

=== Religious backgrounds ===
Mathias Splitlog had an infant baptism by the Catholic church but was a lapsed Catholic. Eliza Splitlog was a devout Quaker. They often welcomed missionaries from different denominations to use the meeting hall on the upper floor of the general store, and later built a large arbor for the Methodist and Quaker missionaries to hold services, but Mathias only attended the Catholic services.

In 1892, Father Ketcham was a new priest working among the Quapaw and other tribes in the area, and Mathias asked to meet with him. It was during these meetings that Eliza and eleven other members of the Splitlog family converted and were baptized as Catholics. In 1893, Mathias Splitlog attended the pontifical mass when Reverend Theophile Meerschaert dedicated the new St. Mary's of the Quapaws 40 miles away, and was confirmed in the Catholic church then.

Father Arthur Versavel, a Belgian immigrant, also visited monthly to conduct mass and to visit with Mathias Splitlog, who spoke French. Several of their grandchildren attended the Catholic Sacred Heart Academy in Vinita, Oklahoma, which Versavel established in 1897 while pastor there, but some of the Splitlog children had marriages conducted by Jeremiah Hubbard, a Quaker missionary.

Mathias and Eliza Splitlog also maintained some traditional Wyandot faith and religious practices. Mathias was well-known as a subject-matter expert who explained the religious stories and beliefs of the Wyandot people to White people interested in learning and documenting the traditions. Both were given Catholic sacraments and services upon their deaths. When Eliza died, Wyandot customs were followed along with the Catholic ones: the men dug a grave and built a fire that burned for days after the funeral; and the women prepared foods for a feast held 10 days after her burial.

=== Construction history ===
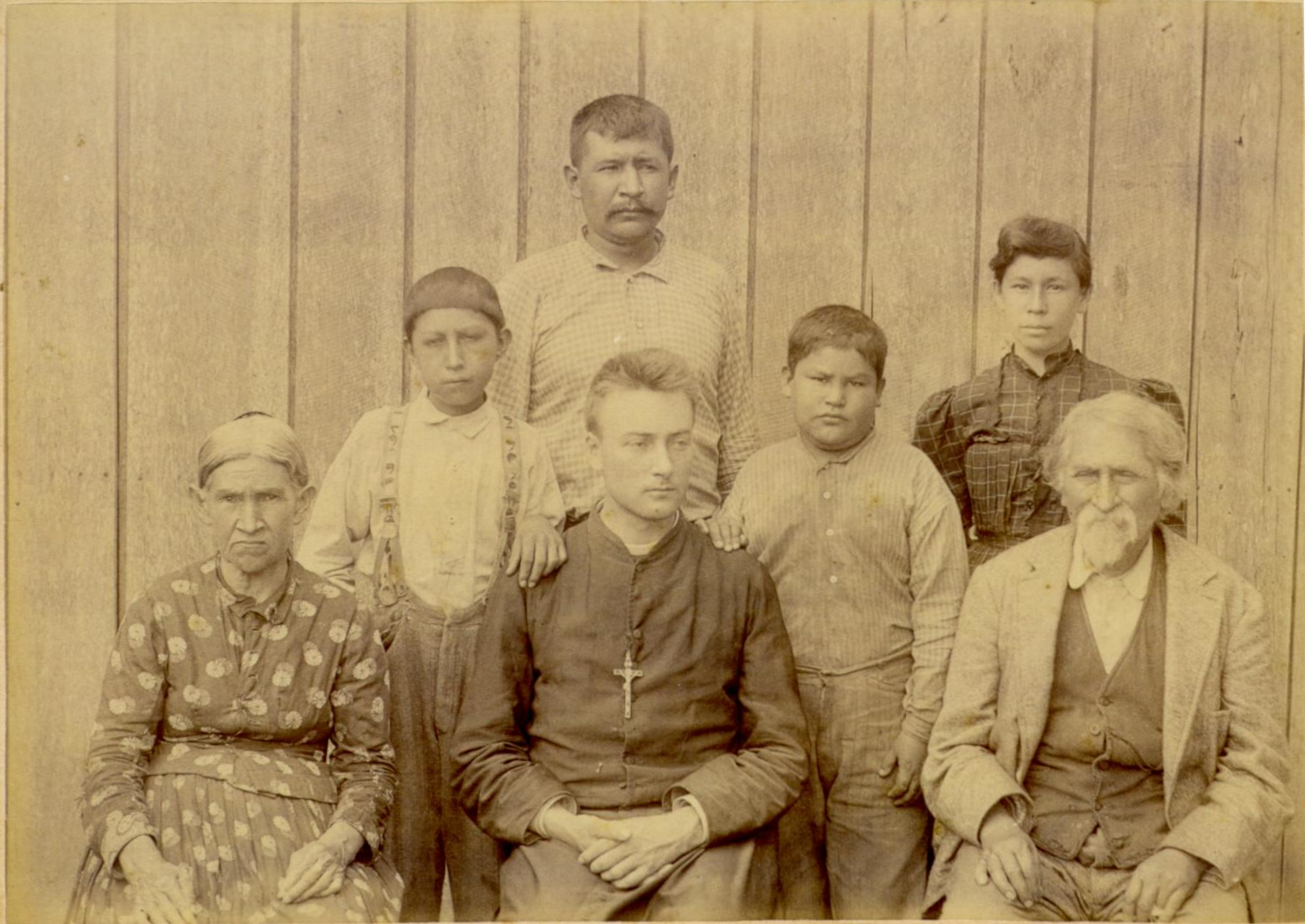
(seated) Eliza Splitlog, Rev. William H. Ketcham, Mathias Splitlog; (standing) Splitlog children and grandchildren

In 1893, Splitlog began building the church. At first, he only wanted to buy a large church bell, but Ketcham suggested that he build an entire mission church to house that bell as well.

Matthias was working under time pressure, because his wife was suffering from an inoperable cancer. He wanted to have the church finished during her lifetime, so she could enjoy his memorial to her. Unfortunately, it was not to be. Father Ketcham gave her last rites and she died in September 1894. The building was not finished but it was used for her funeral. She was buried in the cemetery next to the church.

In 1895, Splitlog restarted construction, and on November 25, 1896 a dedication service was held. The church was dedicated to St. Matthias, with blessings given by Bishop Meerschaert, Father Ketcham, and Father Versavel. More than 100 Catholics and 400 non-Catholics attended the ceremony, during which the large bell also was blessed. The bell's first toll was in memory of Eliza Splitlog, and it was heard even 12 miles (19 km) away.

=== Ownership after 1896 ===
From 1894 to 1896, the Senecas sent Splitlog to Washington, D.C., as a delegate and during one of these trips, in December 1896, Splitlog died of pneumonia. William Nichols, who had travelled with him, brought his body home to Cayuga. In January 1897, Reverend Edward Van Waesberghe, who worked at St. Mary's of the Quapaws, and Reverend Father Schele of Seneca, Missouri, conducted the Requiem Mass. Hundreds of people attended, and Mathias was buried beside his wife in the church cemetery.

Many of Splitlog's children died before him, and immediate issues about his estate were complicated by the laws at the time, and to a lesser extent the wishes of his heirs. The church and cemetery land was on Seneca property, and at that time Seneca people could not sell their own land. Also, some of his heirs were not Catholic and objected to it being sold or given to the Catholic church. There was litigation for several years. In 1906, US Senator Henry C. Hansbrough wrote into the Indian Appropriations Act of fiscal year 1908 that Splitlog's heirs could sell the church, cemetery, and the 3 acres of land to the Roman Catholic Church, which allowed the bishop to buy it at a nominal fee. In 1916, Father Ketcham oversaw the purchase of the church and cemetery property from the Splitlog heirs.

The church building was used occasionally, but by 1930 it had not been used in over 16 years and had been damaged by vandals and weather. Bishop Francis Kelley sold the church, cemetery, and property to the Methodists, who restored it and re-dedicated it for the Methodists.

In 1953, the Methodists sold the church and cemetery land to the Sellers family, who had known the Splitlogs and didn't want to see the property decay. Non-denominational church services are still held at this church.

== Biographical sketch: Matthias Splitlog ==
The church was built by Matthias Splitlog who had come to Indian Territory in 1874, when he was about 62 years old. Family stories said that he was of mixed ancestry, half Cayuga and half French, and born in the state of New York in 1812. According to his grandson, when he was only three years old, he was taken to Ohio, with most of the other Cayugas. The family story goes on to say that Matthias lived among the Wyandottes in Sandusky, Ohio as a young man when he married a Wyandotte woman, thus becoming a member of her tribe. A group of 700 to 800 Wyandottes emigrated to Kansas Territory in 1843, where they had been assigned 148,000 acres (600 km^{2}) on the Neosho River. The tribal leaders decided that this tract for their new home, so they bought a tract of 39 sections lying between the Kansas and Missouri Rivers, in the area that became Kansas City. Although Matthias could neither read nor write, he reportedly could speak seven languages. He was also noted of his mechanical abilities. In Kansas, Matthias revealed himself to be a shrewd businessman. He built the first gristmill in Kansas, and he also built his own steamboat to carry small loads on the river. His land holdings were in the community of Westport, which had become the starting point for numerous wagon trains headed west. A company of speculators calling themselves, the Wyandotte City Company, began buying land around Westport in 1857. Matthias decided to hold out for a higher price and continued living on the land until 1860. When the Civil War broke out, he enlisted in the Union Army and ferried materiel until he was captured by the Confederates. He was paroled, and returned to Kansas.

=== Move to Indian Territory ===
In 1863, the Union Pacific Railroad wanted to cross his land near the river and also build machine shops there. Matthias later said that he was paid a fabulous sum for the property. White settlers soon realized that the Wyandotte land was too valuable to let it remain in Native American hands and began pressuring the Government for their removal. In 1855, they discarded their treaty and tribal rights, to become citizens of the United States, with the same immunities and privileges of white people, including the right to sell their lands. Years before, the Wyandottes had given the Senecas 40,000 acres (160 km^{2}) of land on the Sandusky River in Ohio. The grateful Senecas had promised then to take the Wyandottes in as brothers if they should ever lose their home. In 1857, the Senecas delivered on their pledge by transferring 30,000 acres (120 km^{2}) of the northern end of the Seneca Reservation in Indian Territory to the Wyandottes. The Wyandottes sold their Kansas properties and moved southwest. Initially, Matthias Splitlog stayed behind, but soon his friends began writing letters for him to join them in their new homeland. He had bought another parcel of land and constructed a new home in 1870. The new property was originally named Splitlog Hill, but the name has since been changed to Strawberry Hill. By 1874, Matthias had sold most of his property and journeyed to Indian Territory. He retained ownership of his home and the surrounding 12 acres (0.049 km^{2}) in Kansas City until 1888, when he sold it to the Orchard Place Company. He found a suitable tract between the Grand River and the Cowskin River, near the present day city of Grove, Oklahoma. The property included a large spring that he named Cayuga, in honor of his original tribe.

Splitlog immediately set to work on a variety of building projects. First he constructed a sawmill, then he built a gristmill and a large blacksmith shop. He also established a ferry and a general store. His building projects employed many local people, paid good wages, and treated the employees well. After completing his own home, he built a factory to make buggies, two-seated hacks and coffins. He named the growing town Cayuga Springs. In 1884, a Cayuga post office was established, with one of Matthias' sons, Joseph, as postmaster. Since there were no public schools, Splitlog provided a building and started a subscription school for the community's children.

=== Cayuga Springs ===
John Wesley Morris wrote a brief description of Cayuga Springs and its church. In it, he said that the village burned in 1913. Only the church, the priest's house and the carriage factory remained. Destroyed structures included a hotel, general store, post office, blacksmith shop and eight or ten dwellings.

After Matthias died, the 3 acres (0.012 km^{2}) of land containing the church and cemetery were deeded to the Catholic Church. However, membership declined as Cayuga's residents moved away, and the Church found it very difficult to supply priests to serve this mission, so the parish was dissolved. The confessional, the altar and certain other Catholic-specific items were removed and taken to other churches. The bell was taken down and sent to St. Catherine's church in Nowata, Oklahoma.

In 1930, an individual person bought the church for sentimental reasons, agreeing to maintain the building and cemetery.
