= Tekakwitha Conference =

Roman Catholic institution

The Tekakwitha Conference is a Roman Catholic institution that supports Christian ministry among Native Americans, primarily through its annual meeting.

== History ==
The Tekakwitha Conference began in 1939, when Bishop Aloisius Joseph Muench of the Roman Catholic Diocese of Fargo convened 27 missionaries and three Native American laymen to discuss their pastoral concerns about Northern Plains native communities, in what became an annual event. In 1940, its participants named the meeting, the Tekakwitha Conference, in honor of Kateri Tekakwitha. At the annual meetings, priests, religious brothers and guest speakers involved in region discussed concerns ranging from reservation life and Catholic schools, in the 1940s and 1950s, to urban relocation, native customs in Catholic worship, native deacons, and native self-determination, in the 1960s and 1970s. Prior to 1977, it is believed that attendance at annual meetings remained less than 100 persons.

From 1977 to 1979, the Conference reorganized after becoming moribund and making failed attempts to update itself. With financial support and an invitation from the Bureau of Catholic Indian Missions it invited a substantial number of Native American Catholics and their supporters to attend, which included priests, deacons, religious sisters and laity. In 1978, attendance at the annual meeting exceeded 200 participants for the first time. The Conference welcomed them, it then established a board of directors and it incorporated in 1979.

Since then, attendance at meetings and membership has continued to grow. By the 1990s, membership included native people from throughout the United States and Canada with more than 100 native parishes establishing local chapters called Kateri circles. Through member involvement, the scope of meetings expanded to include Catholic mass with Native American rituals and symbols, such as smudging and songs and prayers in native languages, ongoing reports on the canonization cause of Kateri Tekakwitha and numerous workshops and discussion sessions on pastoral concerns.

In 1980, the Tekakwitha Conference established offices in Great Falls, Montana and initiated a newsletter, now titled Cross and Feathers. Sister Kateri Mitchell, a member of Mohawk Nation and the Sisters of St. Anne, has served as executive director since 1998. Bishop Donald E. Pellotte of Gallup served as its Episcopal moderator from 1981 to 2008 and Archbishop Charles J. Chaput of Philadelphia succeeded him in 2008. In 2013, the Tekakwitha Conference offices moved to Alexandria, Louisiana.

(With the canonization process of Kateri Tekakwitha having reached fruition after many decades, and indeed the several centuries since the Saint's death, both Sr. Kateri Mitchell and the subject of the key second first class miracle attributed to Tekawitha in the 2006 healing of Lummi tribal member, Jake Finkbonner, were participants in Rome on October 21, 2012 in the actual canonization ceremony, and since then the impact, scope, and cultural reach of the conference has begun to grow as might be expected through the recognition of the Roman Catholic Church's, and North America's, first Native American saint. (St. Juan Diego preceded her in 2002 as the first indigenous Roman Catholic Saint from the Americas, but it is also worth noting, historically, that his birth had predated hers by almost two centuries.)

Following these developments, Saint Kateri Tekakwitha has been associated with the Conference through its recognition of her status as a North American Indigenous saint.

== See also ==
- Marquette University Special Collections and University Archives
- Adai Caddo Indian Nation
