= Marquette League =

Roman Catholic organization

From 1904 to 1991 the Marquette League served as a Roman Catholic fund-raising organization in the United States that supported Catholic missions and schools among Native Americans in the United States.

== History ==
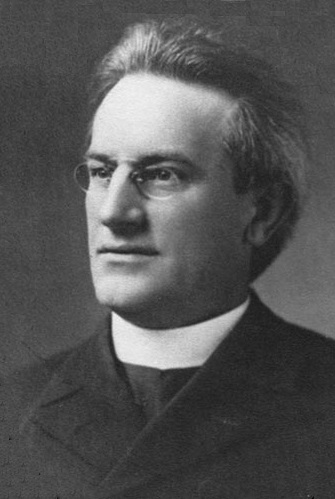
Henry Ganss

Henry Ganss of Lancaster, Pennsylvania founded the League in New York City, in May 1904, and two months later, it received a papal blessing from Pius X. Ganss was a fundraiser for the "Preservation Society" of the Bureau of Catholic Indian Missions, and he founded the League as a fundraising auxiliary of the Preservation Society. However, the Preservation Society ceased in 1922, while the League continued to thrive.

In collaboration with the Bureau, the League distributed the funds and in-kind donations it raised for missions, mission schools and students. It built new missions and satellite chapels and maintained them with supplies; it trained and maintained catechists; and it provided scholarships to students and clothing to the needy.

The League had a lay directorate of 25 members, chosen at first from among local councils of the St. Vincent de Paul Society. To further its work, it established branch organizations in several northeastern U.S. cities, including Baltimore and Washington, D.C. It charged an annual membership fee of $2.00, and published "The Calumet" as a fundraising newsletter from 1913 to 1958. Notable members included:

- John J. Wynne
- Eugene A. Philbin
- William Flynn (Director General, 1925–1936)
- Bernard Cullen (Director General, 1937–1957)

During its first six years (to 1910), aid from the League provided for the establishment of mission chapels in several states. They included:

- Arizona among the Navajo people
- South Dakota on the Pine Ridge Indian Reservation among the Oglala people
- South Dakota on the Rosebud Indian Reservation among the Brulé Lakota people
- Nebraska on the Winnebago Indian Reservation among the Winnebago people
- North Dakota on the Fort Berthold Indian Reservation among the Mandan, Hidatsa, and Arikara Nation

From 1952 to 1958, the League also recruited lay volunteers to serve at missions and schools throughout the United States. The League disbanded in 1991.
