= John Edward Burke =

Ship owner in Australia (1871–1947)

John Edward Burke (8 January 1871 – 9 October 1947) was a shipowner in Queensland, Australia.

== History ==
Burke was born in Brisbane, a son of Captain John Burke (1842 – 3 June 1919)

He was partner with his father in the shipping firm of J. Burke & Son from around 1902 to around 1910, when the company started using the name "J. E. Burke and Son", then "J. E. Burke Ltd" from around November 1923, when they opened their new wharf at Beenleigh.

He was mayor of South Brisbane in 1912.

His company, J. E. Burke, Ltd, owned numerous small ships serving towns on the Gulf of Carpentaria and Cape York Peninsula from Brisbane to Burketown (named for the possibly unrelated Robert O'Hara Burke). Their ships (owned or chartered) include:

- SS Porpoise, Captain Peter Burke, was used by the government in 1911 to search for the missing SS Yongala.
- SS Douglas Mawson, believed lost in storm c. 28 March 1923.

== Family ==
On 17 April 1895 Burke married Bridget O'Keefe (c. 1874 – 11 June 1934). She was born in Sachel, County Tipperary, Ireland and arrived in Australia age 19 (so c. 1893). They had three children:

- John Augustine Burke (1896–1972) of Brisbane was manager of the firm in 1938.
- E. A. Burke of Brisbane
- a daughter married H. Stewart, lived in Sydney.

They had a home on Shafston Avenue, East Brisbane.
