= Cayuga, Oklahoma =

- Census-designated place
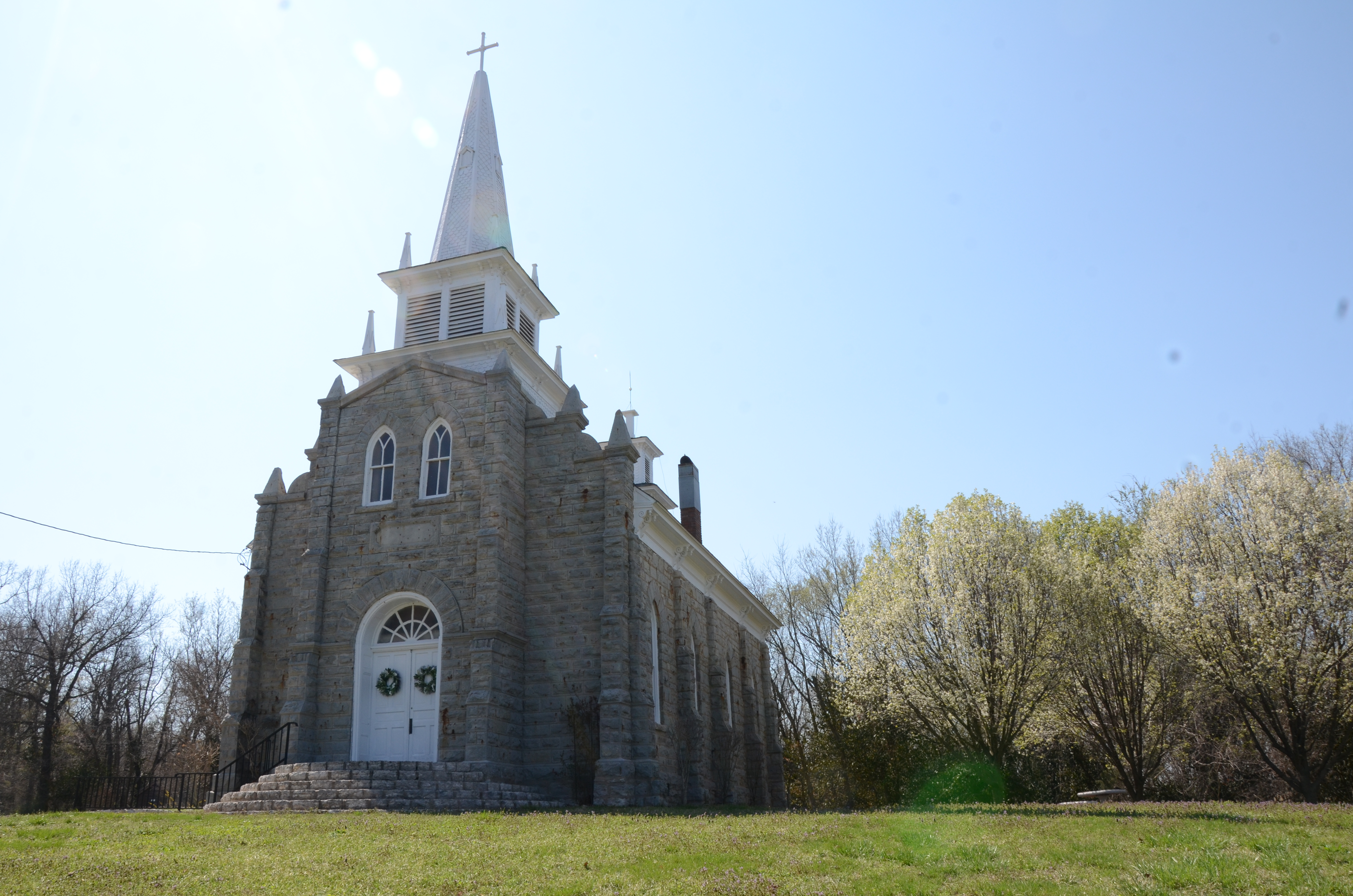
- The Splitlog Church a/k/a the Cayuga Mission Church, on Cayuga's border in 2015

- Location in Oklahoma
- Coordinates: 36°37′31″N 94°39′15″W
- Country: United States
- State: Oklahoma
- County: Delaware

Area
  - Total: 7.10 sq mi (18.40 km^{2})
  - Land: 7.05 sq mi (18.26 km^{2})
  - Water: 0.050 sq mi (0.13 km^{2})
- Elevation: 886 ft (270 m)

Population (2020)
  - Total: 160
  - Density: 22.7/sq mi (8.76/km^{2})
- Time zone: UTC-6 (Central (CST))
  - Summer (DST): UTC-5 (CDT)
- FIPS code: 40-12915
- GNIS feature ID: 2407995
- Website: www.ghosttowns.com/states/ok/cayuga.html

Cayuga, originally known as Cayuga Springs, (Note: While the settlement was known as Cayuga Springs when founded, the town name apparently evolved to just Cayuga as shown by multiple sources, including the Shirk entry on its post office, a 1911 Delaware County map, a modern map, and the Census Bureau.) is an unincorporated community and census-designated place (CDP) in Delaware County, Oklahoma, United States. It was named for the Cayuga people, one of the Five Nations of the Haudenosaunee, and the word itself has a meaning: “the place where the locusts were taken out.” As of the 2020 census, Cayuga had a population of 160.

It was established on the Elk River in the old Seneca Reserve in Indian Territory by Mathias Splitlog and his family in the 1870's. The Cayuga Post Office existed from June 11, 1884, until April 30, 1905.

== Geography ==
Cayuga is located in northeastern Delaware County. Its eastern edge follows the Missouri state line. It is 7 miles (11 km) northeast of Grove, the largest city in Delaware County.

According to the United States Census Bureau, the CDP has a total area of 7.1 square miles (18.3 km^{2}), all land.

== Demographics ==
Historical population
Census	Pop.	Note	%±
2020	160		—
U.S. Decennial Census

=== 2020 census ===
As of the 2020 census, Cayuga had a population of 160. The median age was 52.2 years. 24.4% of residents were under the age of 18 and 21.9% of residents were 65 years of age or older. For every 100 females there were 53.8 males, and for every 100 females age 18 and over there were 51.2 males age 18 and over.

0.0% of residents lived in urban areas, while 100.0% lived in rural areas.

There were 57 households in Cayuga, of which 22.8% had children under the age of 18 living in them. Of all households, 59.6% were married-couple households, 7.0% were households with a male householder and no spouse or partner present, and 22.8% were households with a female householder and no spouse or partner present. About 22.8% of all households were made up of individuals and 12.3% had someone living alone who was 65 years of age or older.

There were 68 housing units, of which 16.2% were vacant. The homeowner vacancy rate was 0.0% and the rental vacancy rate was 0.0%.

Racial composition as of the 2020 census
Race	Number	Percent
White	84	52.5%
Black or African American	0	0.0%
American Indian and Alaska Native	33	20.6%
Asian	0	0.0%
Native Hawaiian and Other Pacific Islander	0	0.0%
Some other race	5	3.1%
Two or more races	38	23.8%
Hispanic or Latino (of any race)	12	7.5%

=== 2000 census ===
As of the census of 2000, there were 105 people, 40 households, and 30 families residing in Cayuga. The population density was 14.6 people per square mile (5.6/km^{2}). There were 57 housing units at an average density of 7.9/sq mi (3.1/km^{2}). The racial makeup of the community was 70.48% White, 6.67% Native American, and 22.86% from two or more races. Hispanic or Latino of any race were 1.90% of the population.

There were 40 households, out of which 37.5% had children under the age of 18 living with them, 67.5% were married couples living together, and 25.0% were non-families. 25.0% of all households were made up of individuals, and 15.0% had someone living alone who was 65 years of age or older. The average household size was 2.63 and the average family size was 3.13.

The age of the population was spread out, with 30.5% under the age of 18, 5.7% from 18 to 24, 26.7% from 25 to 44, 29.5% from 45 to 64, and 7.6% who were 65 years of age or older. The median age was 38 years. For every 100 females, there were 123.4 males. For every 100 females age 18 and over, there were 108.6 males.

The median income for a household in the CDP was $20,893, and the median income for a family was $32,083. Males had a median income of $28,438 versus $21,250 for females. The per capita income for the community was $15,743. There were 7.4% of families and 13.2% of the population living below the poverty line, including 37.5% of under eighteens and none of those over 64.

== Education ==
It is in the Grove Public Schools school district.
