= Hugh Boyle Ewing =

American general (1826–1905)

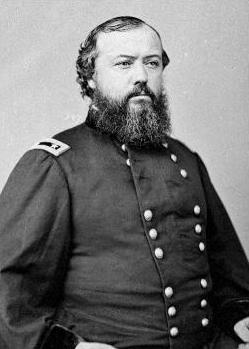
- Maj. Gen. Hugh Ewing
- Born: October 31, 1826; Lancaster, Ohio
- Died: June 30, 1905 (aged 78); Lancaster, Ohio
- Burial place: Saint Mary Cemetery, Lancaster, Ohio
- Military career
- Allegiance: United States of America; Union
- Branch: United States Army; Union Army
- Service years: 1861-1866
- Rank: Brigadier General; Brevet Major General
- Commands: 30th Ohio Infantry; Brigade / Kanawha Division; Brigade / XV Corps; Division / XVI Corps; 4th Division / XV Corps
- Conflicts: American Civil War; Battle of Philippi; Battle of Rich Mountain; Battle of Carnifex Ferry; Battle of Cheat Mountain; Battle of Greenbrier River; Battle of South Mountain; Battle of Antietam; Vicksburg Campaign; Battle of Chattanooga; Battle of Bentonville
- Other work: Lawyer, U.S. Minister to Holland, Farmer, Author

Hugh Boyle Ewing (October 31, 1826 – June 30, 1905) was a diplomat, author, attorney, and Union Army general during the American Civil War. He was a member of the prestigious Ewing family, son of Thomas Ewing, the eldest brother of Thomas Ewing, Jr. and Charles Ewing, and the foster brother and brother-in-law of William T. Sherman. General Ewing was an ambitious, literate, and erudite officer who held a strong sense of responsibility for the men under his command. He combined his West Point experience with the Civil War system of officer election.

Ewing's wartime service was characterized by several incidents which would have a unique impact on history. In 1861, his political connections helped save the reputation of his brother-in-law, William T. Sherman, who went on to become one of the north's most successful generals. Ewing himself went on to become Sherman's most trusted subordinate. His campaigning eventually led to the near-banishment of Lorenzo Thomas, a high-ranking regular army officer who had intrigued against Sherman. He was present at the Battle of Antietam, where his brigade saved the flank of the Union Army late in the day. During the Vicksburg campaign, Ewing accidentally came across personal correspondence from Confederate President Jefferson F. Davis to former President Franklin Pierce which eventually ruined the reputation of the latter. Ewing was also present in Kentucky during Major General Stephen G. Burbridge's "reign of terror", where he worked to oppose Burbridge's harsh policies against civilians, but was hampered by debilitating rheumatism. He ended the war with an independent command, a sign he held the confidence of his superiors, acting in concert with Sherman to trap Confederate Gen. Joseph E. Johnston in North Carolina.

After the war, Ewing spent time as Ambassador to the Netherlands and became a noted author. He died in 1905 on his family farm.

== Early life and career ==
Hugh Ewing was born in Lancaster, Ohio. He was educated at the United States Military Academy at West Point, but was forced to resign on the eve of graduation after failing an engineering exam, which was a major embarrassment to his family. While a member of the cadet corps, he was close friends with future Union generals John Buford Jr., Nathaniel C. McLean, and John C. Tidball. His father appointed Philip Sheridan to the open seat.

During the gold rush in 1849, Ewing went to California, where he joined an expedition ordered by his father, then Secretary of the Interior, to rescue immigrants who were trapped in the Sierra by heavy snows. He returned in 1852 with dispatches for the government.

He then completed his course in law and settled in St. Louis. He practiced law there from 1854 to 1856, when he moved with his young brother, Thomas Jr., and brothers-in-law William T. Sherman and Hampden B. Denman to Leavenworth, Kansas, and began speculating in lands, roads, and government housing. They quickly established one of the leading law firms of Leavenworth, as well as a financially powerful land agency.

In 1858, Ewing married Henrietta Young, daughter of George W. Young, a large planter of the District of Columbia, whose family was prominent in the settlement and history of Maryland. He soon afterward took charge of his father's salt works in Ohio.

== Civil War ==
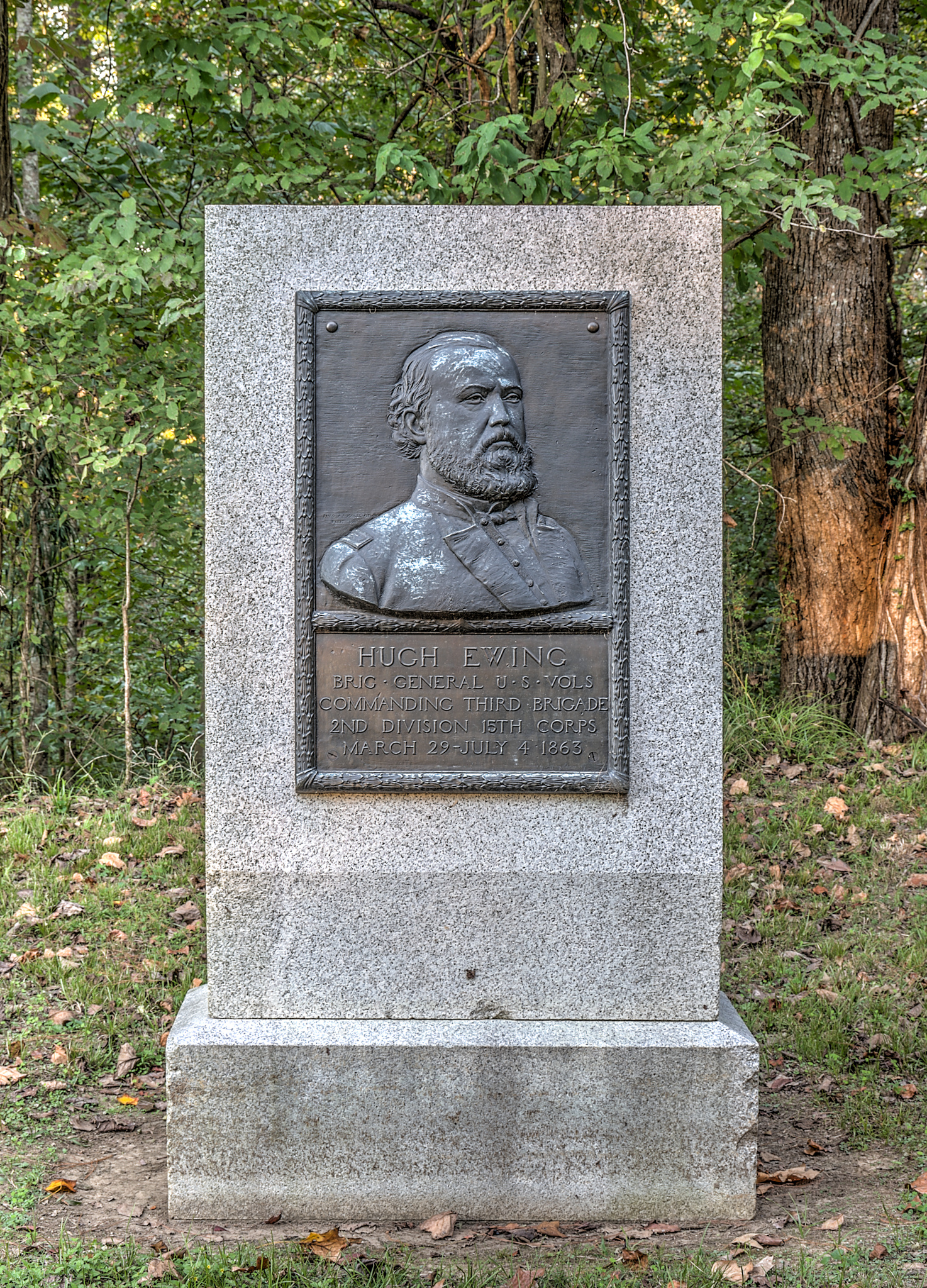
Relief portrait by Theo Alice Ruggles Kitson at Vicksburg National Military Park

In April 1861, Governor William Dennison appointed Ewing as the brigade-inspector of Ohio volunteers. He served under Rosecrans and McClellan in western Virginia. Ewing became colonel of the 30th Ohio Volunteer Infantry in August 1861.

In November 1861, when his brother-in-law William T. Sherman was relieved of his command in disgrace, Ewing aided his younger sister Ellen Ewing Sherman in making the rounds of Washington D.C., denying sensationalist media claims that Sherman was insane, and personally lobbying the President for Sherman's reinstatement. Ewing and his sister argued that Sherman's requests for men and material in Kentucky had been denied in Washington, and that the charges of insanity had been part of a conspiracy orchestrated by Adjutant General Lorenzo Thomas. Eventually the political influence of the Ewing family persevered, and with the assistance of Henry Halleck, Sherman was returned to command. President Abraham Lincoln praised Sherman's "talent & conduct" publicly to a large group of important officers, and later banished Thomas to a meaningless post on recruiting duty in the Trans-Mississippi Theater.

Under McClellan, Ewing commanded a regiment and then a brigade in the Kanawha Division in the IX Corps. In the Battle of South Mountain, he led the assault which drove the enemy from the summit; and at midnight of that day, he received an order placing him in command of the brigade of Colonel Eliakim P. Scammon, who was in temporary command of the Kanawha division after its commander Major General Jacob D. Cox had been elevated to command of the IX Corps, replacing the fallen Major General Jesse Lee Reno who was killed earlier that day. At Antietam his brigade was placed upon the extreme left of the army, where, according to the report of the commander of the left wing, General Ambrose Burnside, "by a brilliant change of front he saved the left from being completely driven in."

After Antietam, Ewing was placed on sick leave because of chronic dysentery, and was promoted to Brigadier General on November 29, 1862. He transferred West and served throughout the campaign before Vicksburg, leading the assaults made by General Sherman; and upon its fall was placed in command of a division in the XVI Corps. At Chattanooga, he was given command of the 4th Division of the XV Corps, which formed the advance of Sherman's army and carried Missionary Ridge. Prior to the Battle of Chattanooga, Ewing's command led a diversionary raid that resulted in the destruction of the Empire State Iron Works in Dade County, Georgia, which was being refurbished to increase the South's manufacturing capability. Sherman considered Ewing his most reliable division commander.

In the aftermath of Vicksburg, Ewing's command wrecked Confederate President Jefferson Davis's Fleetwood Plantation, and Ewing turned over Davis' personal correspondence to his brother-in-law, Sherman. However, Ewing also sent copies of the letters to a few people he had known in Ohio, which, after the documents were published, permanently sullied the reputation of former President Franklin Pierce of New Hampshire. Their release coincided with that of Pierce's book, Our Old Home. As early as 1860, Pierce had written to Davis about "the madness of northern abolitionism", and other letters uncovered stated that he would "never justify, sustain, or in any way or to any extent uphold this cruel, heartless, aimless unnecessary war", and that "the true purpose of the war was to wipe out the states and destroy property."

In October 1863, Ewing was placed in command of the occupation forces in Louisville, Kentucky. He was unfortunate enough to serve during Maj. Gen. Stephen Gano Burbridge's "reign of terror," where martial law was declared several times. On August 11, 1864, Burbridge ordered soldiers from the 26th Kentucky to select four men to be taken from prison in Louisville to Eminence, Kentucky, to be shot for unknown outrages, and on August 20, several suspected Confederate guerrillas were also to be taken from Louisville and executed. General Ewing declared their innocence and sought a pardon from Burbridge, but he refused to give the pardon and the men were shot.

In his autobiography, Ewing describes an incident in October 1862 with Colonel Augustus Moor, who had struck a member of Ewing's regiment with his sword when the enlisted soldier had fallen out of a march. Ewing immediately confronted Moor. In his own words:

He was at the table with his Staff and Colonels, drinking Ohio wine from long-necked bottles, and smoking, and presented quite an old-time German scene. I Told him I would not tolerate the German custom of treating common soldiers, if applied to my men, by any officer. I preserved discipline by taking care of my troops, collectively and individually.

— Hugh Boyle Ewing

Colonel Moor quickly apologized. While General Ewing respected the discipline of the German regiment, he preferred a different atmosphere in his own command, better suited to Americans. He was capable of recognizing the military tradition of other units while accommodating the unique needs of his own. General Ewing was ordered to North Carolina in 1865, and was planning an expedition up the Roanoke river to co-operate with the Army of the James, when Lee surrendered.

In 1864, Ewing suffered an attack of rheumatism, and received treatment several times thereafter, often being confined to his chair. He was likely prostrated with illness as Commander of Louisville during Burbridge's madness in Kentucky. He was made a brevet major general on March 13, 1865. After leaving the Army, he experienced painful attacks for the rest of his life, often bedridden for periods of up to forty days.

== Postbellum career ==
President Andrew Johnson appointed Ewing as U.S. Minister to Holland, where he served from 1866 to 1870. This appointment may have drawn the ire of the Radical Republicans, for Speaker of the House James G. Blaine urged President Ulysses S. Grant that Ewing be recalled and replaced with his brother, Charles Ewing. Blaine told the President that Hugh was 'acting badly'. Blaine himself was disingenuous, having represented to prominent politicians in Ohio including Senator John Sherman that he was doing everything possible to nominate his close personal friend, former Ohio General Roeliff Brinkerhoff, for the post. Nonetheless, Blaine's request to recall General Ewing was never acted upon, possibly due to the influence of his sister, whose husband General Sherman was a very close friend to President Grant. Ewing was related to Blaine through Blaine's mother Maria Louise Gillespie Blaine.

Upon his eventual return to the United States, Ewing retired to a farm near Lancaster, Ohio, where he died of old age.

He was the author of: The Black List; A Tale of Early California (1887); A Castle in the Air (1887); The Gold Plague, and other works.

== See also ==
- List of American Civil War generals (Union)
- Louisville in the American Civil War

== Notes ==
Preceded by Albert Rhodes	U.S. Minister to the Netherlands; 1866–1870	Succeeded by Charles T. Gorham
