= Charles Ewing (general) =

American general (1835–1883)

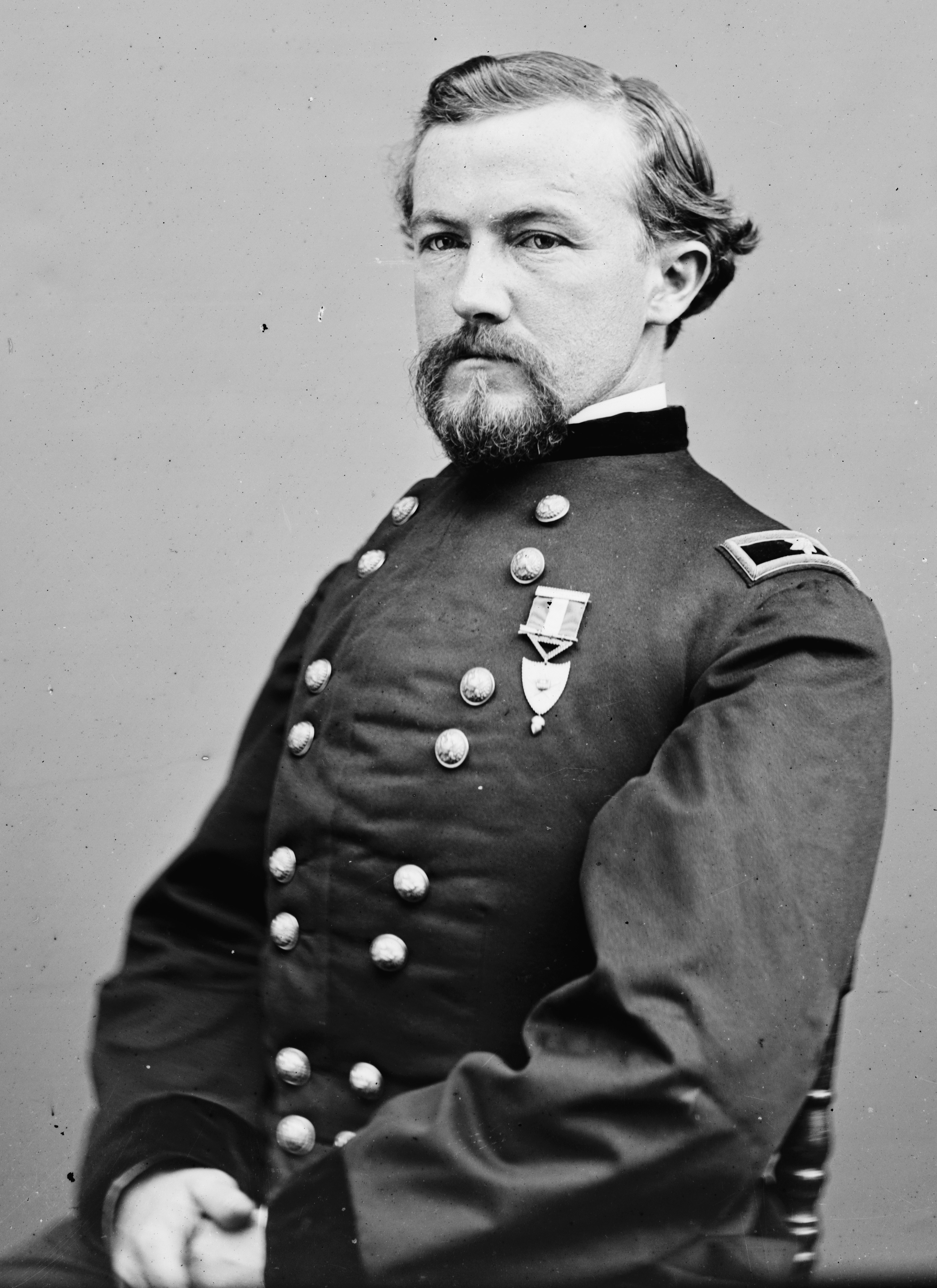
- Ewing, 1860–1870
- Born: March 6, 1835; Lancaster, Ohio, US
- Died: June 20, 1883 (aged 48); Washington, D.C., US
- Burial place: Arlington National Cemetery
- Military career
- Allegiance: United States of America; Union
- Branch: United States Army; Union Army
- Service years: 1861–1867
- Rank: Captain, USA; Brigadier General, USV
- Unit: 13th Infantry Regiment
- Commands: 1st Battalion, 13th Infantry Regiment
- Conflicts: American Civil War; Battle of Shiloh; Battle of Vicksburg; Atlanta campaign; Battle of Bentonville
- Other work: Lawyer

Charles Ewing (March 6, 1835 – June 20, 1883) was an attorney and Union Army general during the American Civil War. He was the son of Interior Secretary Thomas Ewing, the brother of Thomas Ewing Jr. and Hugh Boyle Ewing, and the foster brother and brother-in-law of William T. Sherman. Ewing's sister and Sherman's wife was Ellen Ewing Sherman.

== Early life and career ==
He was educated at St. Joseph's College in Perry County, Ohio, and at the University of Virginia. He studied law, was admitted to practice and was so engaged at St. Louis, Missouri, when the Civil War broke out.

== Civil War ==
He then joined the U.S. Army and was commissioned in May 1861 as a captain in the 13th Infantry, of which William T. Sherman, his brother-in-law, was colonel. He was appointed inspector-general on the staff of General Sherman, when in command of the western army.

At the Battle of Vicksburg he planted the flag of his battalion on the parapet of the Confederate fort, and received a severe wound. For this action he was brevetted major in 1863; for his action at Jackson, Collierville and Missionary Ridge, in the Atlanta campaign he was made lieutenant-colonel by brevet in 1864, and for gallant conduct in the march to the sea and thence through the Carolinas to Washington he was brevetted colonel in 1865. He was made brigadier-general of volunteers, March 8, 1865.

== Postbellum career ==
In 1867 General Ewing resigned his commission in the army, and opened a successful law practice in Washington, D.C. Beginning in 1874, he served as the Catholic Commissioner for Indian Missions (later known as the Bureau of Catholic Indian Missions), which involved defending Roman Catholic mission interests and Native American rights. Based on its prior missionary initiatives the Catholic Church felt justified in operating schools at 34 of the 72 agencies, but the administration of President Ulysses S. Grant allowed them at only seven. Ewing served as Catholic Commissioner until his death in Washington on June 20, 1883.

== See also ==
- List of American Civil War generals (Union)
- Bureau of Catholic Indian Missions
