= 33rd Alabama Infantry Regiment =

Infantry regiment of the Confederate States Army

- Flag of Alabama in 1861 (obverse and reverse)
- Active: April 23, 1862 – April 8, 1865
- Disbanded: April 8, 1865
- Country: Confederate States of America
- Branch: Confederate States Army
- Role: Infantry
- Equipment: 1853 Enfield Rifle; 1861 Springfield Rifle
- Engagements: American Civil War; Pensacola Campaign; Kentucky Campaign; Munfordville; Perryville; Stones River Campaign; Murfreesboro; Tullahoma Campaign; Chattanooga campaign Chattanooga II; Chickamauga; Siege of Chattanooga; Ringgold Gap; Atlanta campaign Rocky Face Ridge; Resaca; New Hope Church; Pickett's Mill; Kennesaw Mountain; Siege of Atlanta; Atlanta; Jonesboro; Franklin-Nashville Campaign; Spring Hill; Franklin; Nashville; Carolina Campaign; Bentonville

Commanders
- Notable commanders: Samuel Adams; Robert Crittenden

The 33rd Alabama Infantry Regiment was an infantry unit from Alabama that served in the Confederate States Army during the U.S. Civil War. Recruited from the southeastern counties of Butler, Dale, Coffee, Covington, Russell and Montgomery, it saw extensive service with the Confederate Army of Tennessee before being nearly annihilated at the Battle of Franklin in 1864. Survivors from the regiment continued to serve until the final capitulation of General Joseph Johnston in North Carolina in 1865.

In addition to the counties named above, the 33rd Alabama drew recruits from three modern Alabama counties that did not yet exist in 1862: Geneva County, which was then a part of Dale and Coffee counties; Crenshaw County, which was formed from Covington and other nearby counties after the war; and Houston County, which then formed a part of Dale and Henry Counties.

Initially assigned to the defense of Confederate forts in Pensacola Bay, Florida, the 33rd was quickly transferred to duty in the Army of Tennessee, where it saw its first significant action at the Battle of Perryville. It went on to fight at Stone's River, Chickamauga, the Siege of Chattanooga, the Atlanta campaign (including Ringgold Gap and Kennesaw Mountain), and the disastrous Franklin-Nashville Campaign in late 1864.

From just after the Battle of Perryville through the Battle of Franklin, the 33rd fought under the "Stonewall of the West": Major General Patrick Cleburne, an Irish-born officer whom General Robert E. Lee once referred to as "a meteor shining from a clouded sky" for his battlefield prowess. Though it took horrific losses at Perryville (where it suffered eighty-two percent casualties) and at Franklin (where it lost two-thirds of its numbers), it held together with reduced numbers until the final Carolina Campaign in 1865.

Historians of the 33rd benefit from extremely detailed accounts of this regiment's service by soldiers who served in it; the most important of these was written by Private W.E. Matthews of Co. B, who left records of nearly every aspect of regimental life from food to clothing to nicknames, sundries and even the soldiers' opinions of two different service rifles they were issued.

== Recruitment and early deployments ==
=== Initial organization, officers and strength ===
The 33rd Alabama Infantry Regiment was organized in April 1862, in Pensacola, Florida. The following table shows information about each company at the time of the regiment's initial formation:

Company	Counties of Origin	Towns of Origin	Officers/Enlisted	Commanding Officer	Notes
A	Coffee	Elba	4 / 109	Captain Mason Creed Kimmey	Called "The Coffee County Blues."
B	Dale	Newton, Skipperville, Clopton, Echo, Barnes Cross Roads	4 / 112	Captain Ward	Called "The Dale County Grays."
C	Butler	Greenville	4 / 100	Captain James Dunklin	Called "The Butler County Light Infantry."
D	Butler	Georgiana	4 / 83	Captain David McKee	Called "The Butler County Volunteers."
E	Montgomery	Montgomery	4 / Unknown	Captain Henderson Norman	No nickname preserved for this company.
F	Coffee, Covington	Brandon's Store, Brayersville	4 / 85	Captain A.H. Justice	Called "The Covington and Coffee Grays."
G	Dale	Daleville	3 / 80	Captain Reuben Jackson Cooper	Called "The Daleville Blues."
H	Butler, Montgomery	Greenville, other towns	4 / 87	Captain Thomas Pugh	Called "The Greenville Guards," or "The Davis Rangers."
I	Dale	Newton, Haw Ridge, Rocky Head, Westville, Ozark	4 /92	Captain Robert Flournoy Crittenden	Called "Zollikoffer's Avengers" or "Yalikoffer's Avengers."
K	Coffee, Russell	Clintonville	4 / 79	Captain Daniel Horn	Called "The Shorter Guards."

=== Ft. McRee ===
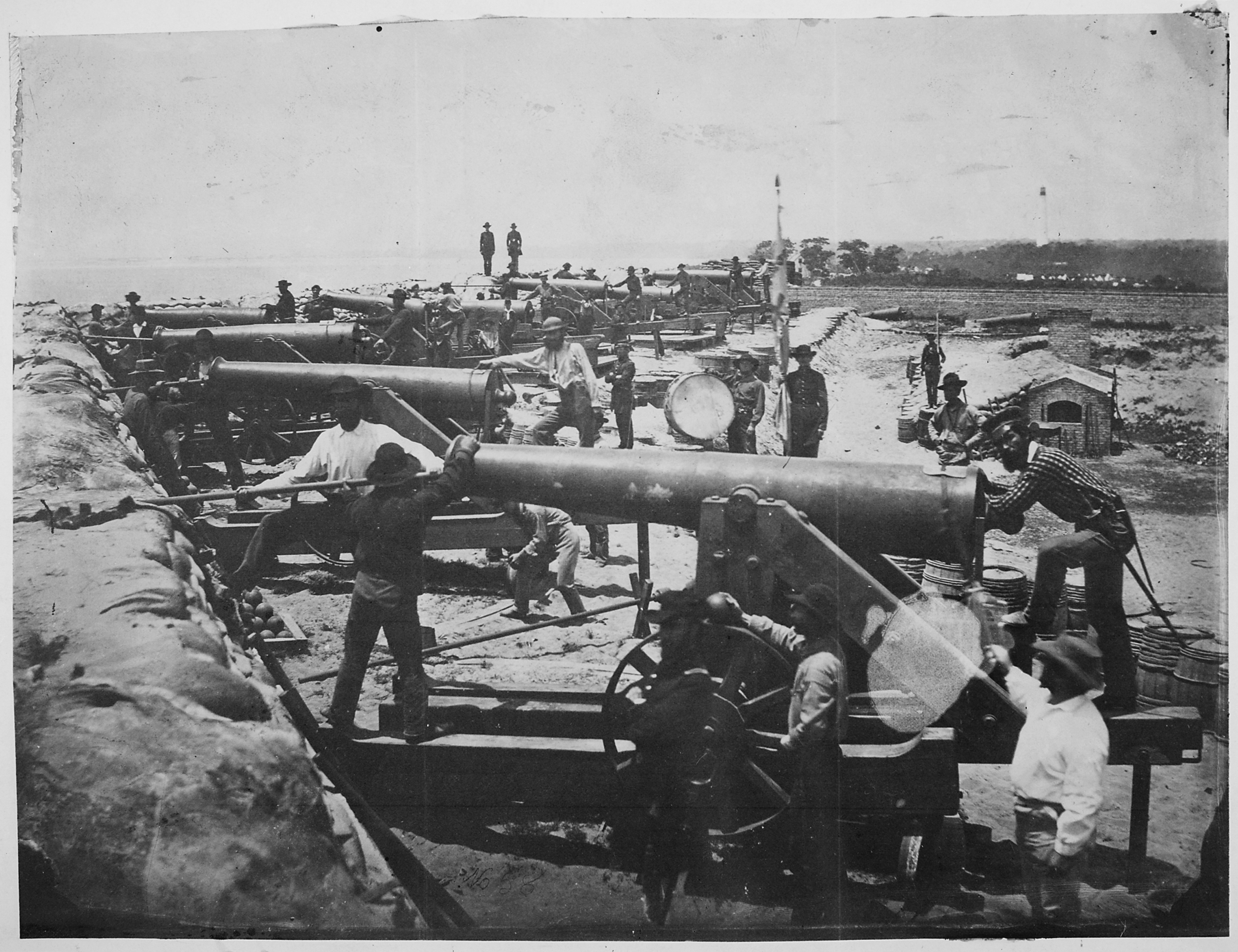
Columbiad guns of the Confederate water battery at Warrington, Florida, near Fort McRee in Pensacola Bay

The 33rd Alabama was initially assigned to duty during March–April 1862 at Fort McRee, which sat at the entrance to Pensacola Bay, Florida, opposite the Federal-held Fort Pickens. By the time the 33rd arrived, Ft. McRee had been reduced to near-rubble by Federal warships and the guns of Ft. Pickens. However, the local commander, General Braxton Bragg, insisted on holding it, anyway. According to one veteran's memoirs, their time at this location was spent in initial military training, drill, and guard duty.

At one point, local commanders decided to remove the coastal artillery from the badly damaged fortress, and the 33rd was asked to help. The guns were removed from their five- to eight-inch bases during daylight hours; later, at night, they were slung beneath a specially built wagon equipped with fourteen-inch-wide tires, to which thirty-six mules were hitched. A lengthy rope was tied to the tongue, and 100 soldiers were tasked with pulling on it to help these mules haul the cannon across the sandy beach to barges on the bay, which in turn carried them on to Pensacola. The guns were replaced with wood planks shaped and painted to resemble artillery, to deceive the Federals into thinking the fort—or what was left of it at this point—was still a threat.

While on duty at Ft. McRee, the regiment had its first direct encounter with the enemy—or what it thought was the enemy, at the time. During a fierce rainstorm one night, a Federal ship endeavoring to resupply Ft. Pickens encountered difficulties and jettisoned some of its cargo (described as "many barrels of vinegar, boxes of crackers and other things"); sentinels from Co's B and I mistook these floating crates for an amphibious assault force approaching their position, and fired on them before realizing their error. Private Matthews reported engaging a "whaleboat full of Yankees" trying to salvage some of these supplies; apparently, little damage was done by either side.

=== Moving to Corinth ===
Following their initial duty at Pensacola, the 33rd was ordered to report to Corinth, Mississippi, for duty with General Albert Sidney Johnston's Army of Mississippi. Arriving just after the Confederate loss at Shiloh (in which Johnston was killed and replaced in command by General P.G.T. Beauregard), the 33rd was assigned to the brigade commanded by Colonel Alexander T. Hawthorn, which was part of the Army's 3rd Corps. In July 1862 Hawthorn's brigade became part of a division commanded by Major General William Hardee, and the following month the 33rd was transferred to a brigade (still in Hardee's division) commanded by Brigadier General Sterling Wood. Private Matthews reported being "strung out in muddy ditches in S.A.M. Wood's brigade," in May 1862, and also indicates that he and his comrades traded in their Pensacola muskets for "new painted Enfield Rifles out of the boxes, with Minie balls cartridges, new bayonets and scabbards." He reports that several soldiers were ill, and says that "we did not like the water [in Corinth], except that we carried from a flowing artesian well."

This same veteran later provided an anecdote from the regiment's time in Corinth:

On the evening of May 29th [1862], the 33rd Alabama and others, maybe the brigade, were withdrawn from the front to near [the] railroad before sunset, where we had orders to yell as loudly as we could as each trainload of reinforcements came in, and soon afterward the first train came by, and we made the forest resound with our yells and in some fifteen minutes another came in, and we yelled as we did for each of the six or perhaps ten of the empty trains; we afterwards learned that it was a ruse to deceive the Federal General [Henry] Halleck.

During this time, the men of the 33rd discarded many items that they now considered non-essential, burdened down as they were on their frequent marches: "hammers, pillows, towels, books, bedclothing, clothing, big knives, tinware, sheepskins, bear skins and other paraphernalia."

== The Kentucky Campaign ==
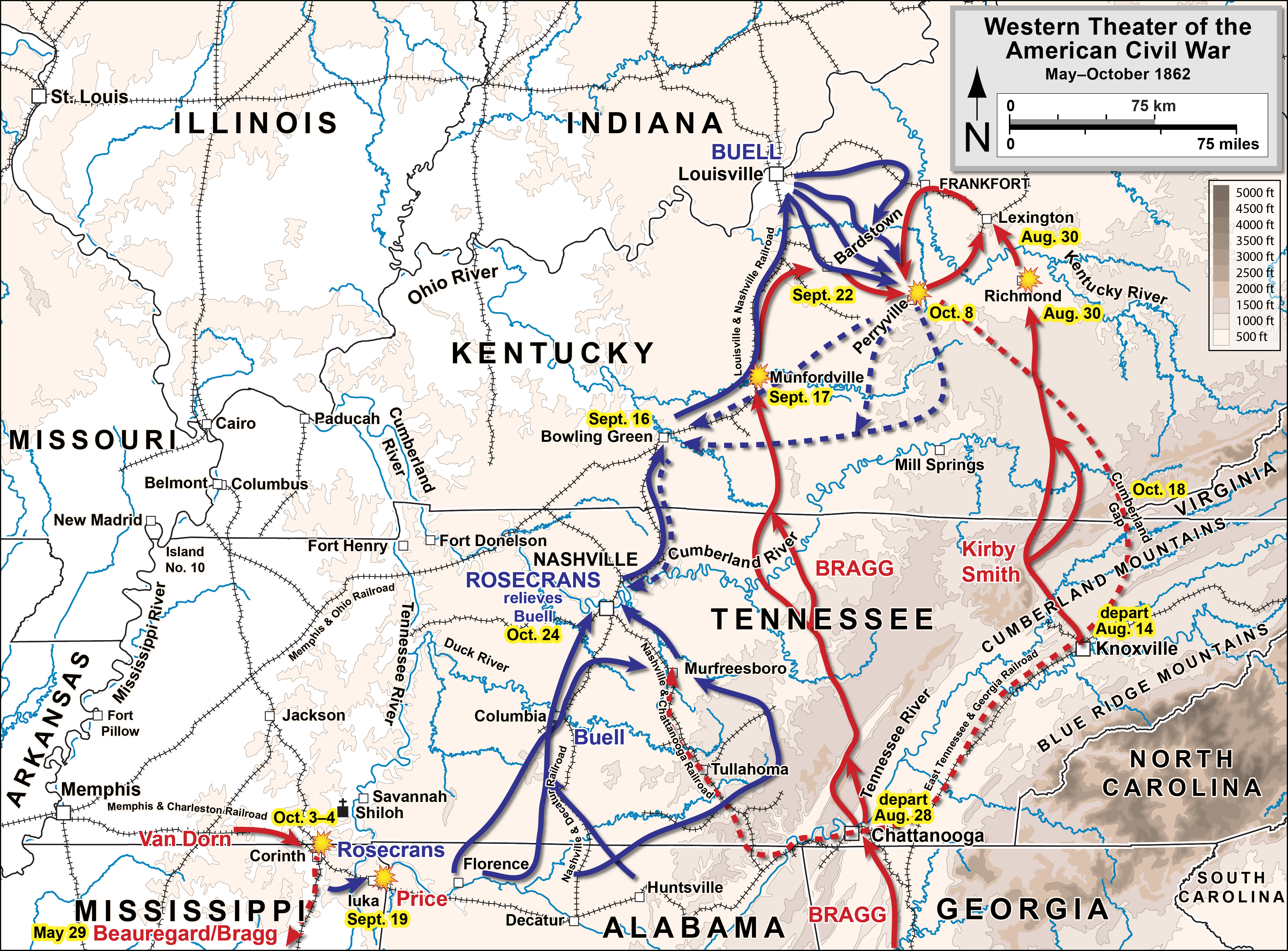
Confederate and Federal movements during the Kentucky Campaign

=== Moving south—then north ===
When General Hardee was given command of the "Left Wing" of the Army of Mississippi (now commanded by General Bragg, from the 33rd's Pensacola days), Wood's Fourth Brigade was assigned to the Third Division of the Left Wing, under command of Major General Simon Bolivar Buckner. In concert with the rest of the army, the 33rd left Corinth at the end of July and travelled by train from Tupelo, Mississippi, to Meridian; thence to Mobile, Alabama, and Montgomery, then on to Atlanta, Georgia, and Dalton before arriving at Tyner's Station, just east of Chattanooga, Tennessee. Following this, Wood's brigade marched into the city, where they crossed the Tennessee River on "a ferry boat, propelled by two blind horses" while picking up two months' pay (at $11 per month), a $50 bounty for each soldier, new shoes and clothing, and rations.

=== Battle of Munfordville ===
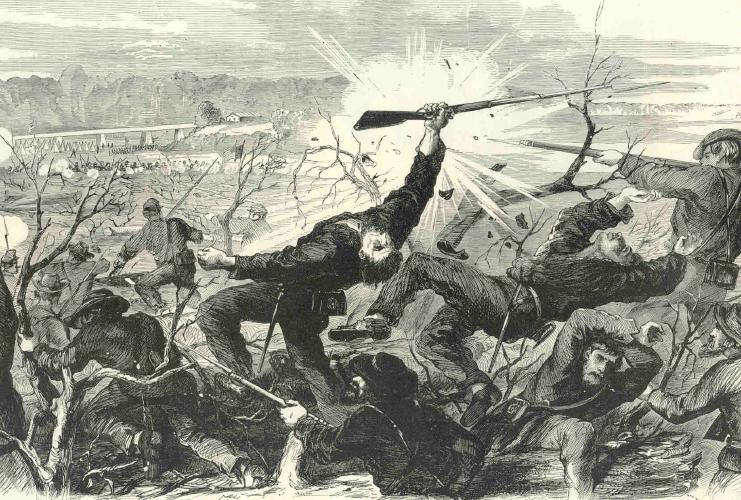
The Battle of Munfordville

Up to now, the 33rd had not seen any significant action, but this was about to change. Emboldened by recent successes achieved by Confederate raiders under Colonel John Hunt Morgan and seeking to divert Federal attention from the strategically important towns of Chattanooga and Vicksburg, Mississippi, General Bragg decided to invade Kentucky, a slave state that had remained loyal to the Union—but which still contained a large pro-Confederate minority. Pursuing Federal troops rounded up many stragglers, but refrained from attacking the main Confederate force at first. Bragg's army reached the fortified town of Munfordville, on the Green River, on September 14. Despite the huge advantage in numbers possessed by the Southerners, the Federal commander, Colonel John T. Wilder, refused the initial demand for surrender. Confederate forces attacked his works and were repulsed, settling in for a two-day siege before the Federal commander was finally persuaded to give up after being taken on a personal tour of the Confederate siege lines by General Buckner.

=== Battle of Perryville ===
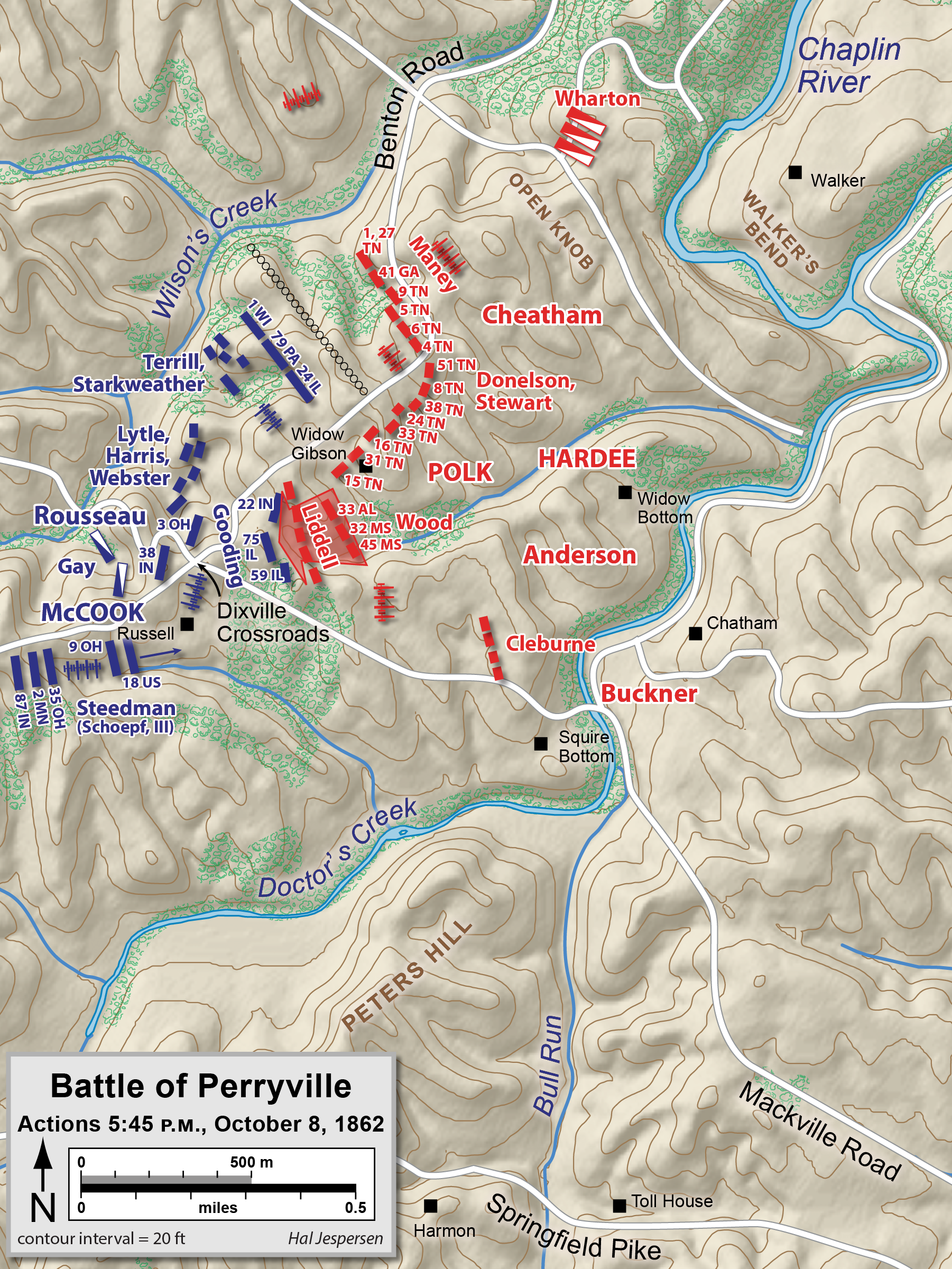
The assault of Wood's Brigade at Perryville (see pink arrow)

Following a Confederate victory at Richmond, Kentucky on August 30, Confederate forces advanced deeper into that state, seeking to drive the Federals across the Ohio River and thus establish the Confederacy's northern boundary on that waterway. A drought that summer had impacted both armies, with one soldier of the 33rd Alabama saying that: "we obtained water under deep limesinks, some of these being partly full of water, and Federals had utilized some of the partly filled sinks as a place to butcher cattle and dumped offal into them, making the water unfit to drink." Another soldier, from the 9th Tennessee, reported that the only water available was usually from ponds, and this was "so muddy that we could not wash our faces in it." Food supplies were also impacted by the dry weather, with Federal forces reduced first to half-rations, then to quarter-rations, then to hardtack and finally to "wormy flour". The Southerners fared little better.

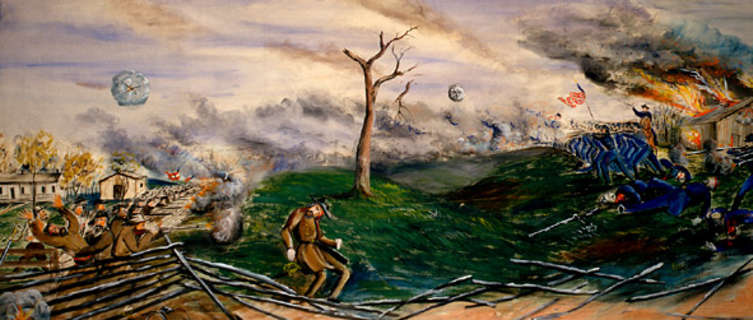
Attacking Confederates at the Perryville Slaughter Pen, drawn by an eyewitness. The "Slaughter Pen" is where the 33rd Alabama and its sister units fought at Perryville.

Desperate for water, both armies converged on the tiny village of Perryville, Kentucky, where water was said to still be available. The Confederates reached the town first, with the 33rd Alabama arriving around 10:00 am on the morning of October 7 and deploying with the rest of Wood's brigade to the north of town. A battle commenced on the morning of October 8, with the 33rd taking little part until late afternoon, when Bragg called for fresh troops to launch an attack on Dixville Crossroads, held by the 34th Federal Brigade under Colonel George Webster. Webster's brigade contained the 22nd Indiana, 75th Illinois and 59th Illinois Infantry regiments, all of whom were raw recruits who had never seen combat before. In addition to these units, the 19th Indiana Artillery under Captain Samuel Harris assisted Webster in defending this area, which later became known as the "Perryville Slaughter Pen."

Wood's brigade, including the 33rd Alabama, attacked around 5pm and ran into murderous fire from Webster's men. The Federals, supported by Captain Harris' battery, decimated the attacking Confederates and forced them to withdraw. Regrouping at the base of the hill, the 33rd and its sister regiments—now assisting a fresh brigade led by Brigadier General St. John Richardson Liddell—charged again, taking more casualties but ultimately driving the Federals from the hill after Harris' battery ran out of ammunition and was forced to withdraw. The 22nd Indiana, directly opposite the 33rd Alabama, suffered 65% casualties—the most of any Federal unit on the battlefield.

Private Matthews describes the action in these words:

We got to Perryville October 7th, I think around 10:00 AM, passed through the town and bivouacked to the north or left of the pike, obtaining water under a deep lime sink, then moved by the right flank in column and halted in line on a ridge. A Federal battery [Harris'] on a ridge in sight across a field began shelling us ... Sempel's Battery [an Alabama battery with six guns assigned to Woods' brigade] got into position near the right of the 33rd Alabama, near a house, and in the artillery duel that followed General S.A.M. Wood our Brigadier, fell or was thrown from his horse and left the field; and the regiments that went into the fight were without the aid of a Brigadier, no one assuming the command that I know of or saw.^{c} The ranks of most were laying down in line and about one or two PM after each company had thrown their knapsacks into a separate heap, the batteries yet playing on each other, the 33rd Alabama and the 32nd Mississippi to our left moved in at a right-shoulder arms ... The command to the 33rd Alabama was to guide left, and to the 32nd Mississippi to guide right. We moved down and across a stubble field ... Company B of the 33rd [Alabama] was at times partly in front or rear or right of the 32nd Mississippi, the pressing together causing some boys to use language they did not learn at church ... Our officers who were not wounded urged us forward, and we rushed their line which broke after one getting near the muzzle of their guns ... Company B on the left of the regiment passed between some of their [cannon], and pushed on over the ridge and down the slope and across the second valley in pursuit of them and up another slope into some timber, to where we met a [second] line behind a fence. We got to within about thirty steps of this fence, but our ranks were so thinned that we could not get to them. We stayed there about thirty minutes, during which time some [of] our guns got choked with burning powder, when we would exchange them for others laying around.

We having no men on our right, they enfiladed us from the right, while the line behind the fence in front seemed determined to stay. Then the Federals got to advancing around the right of the 33rd Alabama, where it had no support and doubling its right back in the rear of its left, the regiment pivoting on the right of the 32nd Mississippi ... Col. Sam Adams [the 33rd's regimental commander] had been wounded in the foot, and LTC Robert F. Crittenden ordered the left of the regiment to drop back some, the right being then quite forty-five degrees in rear of the 32nd Mississippi, the pivot. In falling back the entire regiment dropped back some, but Col. Crittenden halted us, where we squatted on our knees loading and firing for a short time in the valley or depression to the right and in rear of the right company of the 32nd Mississippi, and facing almost at a right angle compared with our former front ... the 32nd Mississippi gave way and all ran up the slope, and about the time we were passing the captured battery that had wrought such havoc among us earlier in the evening, but now had been out of action for an hour or more, Col. Crittenden, Cpt. Bob Hughes and other officers rallied our fleeing men behind a rail fence, a graveyard, and checked them until an Arkansas brigade carrying our blue and white flags came up and fired one [volley] into the fleeing Federals, killing many of them and driving the remainder back. Had some of these or other troops been moved in on our right earlier in the evening, and kept the Federals off our right flanks and from getting in our rear, we might have carried the line behind the fence on our first front.

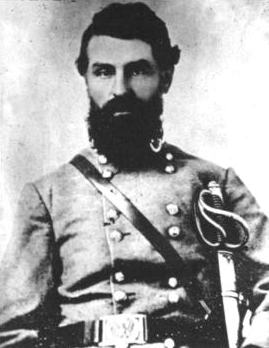
Brig. General S.A.M. Wood

When the smoke finally cleared that evening, the Confederates had won a tactical victory at Perryville. However the approach of fresh Union forces and the increasingly untenable situation in Kentucky compelled Bragg to order a retreat. The 33rd and the rest of Bragg's army withdrew to Tennessee through the Cumberland Gap, leaving the Federals in possession of Kentucky for the rest of the war.

During the Battle of Perryville, the 33rd Alabama suffered an appalling casualty rate of 82%. Entering the battle with 500 men,^{d} the regiment came out with only 88 fit for duty. Of the thirty-two men in the 33rd's Company B who fought at Perryville, two were killed on the field and nineteen more were wounded—of whom only nine survived.

After the battle, Private Matthews reported that the surviving members of the regiment carried their injured comrades to field hospitals, while others removed the personal effects from the dead to return to their families in Alabama. He reports that though exhausted from the day's fighting, the surviving troops spent all that night carrying water to their friends, gathering straw for them to lie on, and assisting the surgeons in caring for them. When some of the wounded complained of being cold, their comrades covered them with their own blankets. Upon returning to their camp later on, the survivors discovered that their left-behind knapsacks had been plundered by persons unknown. According to Matthews, "few of us carried knapsacks, afterwards."

Private Matthews reported that "for a few days after the battle, our right shoulders were quite sore from the rebound of our Enfield Rifles when firing, as they were after any prolonged firing, and some rifles kicked worse than others." He equally reported that due to the loss of their horses by all four regimental officers who rode them into the fight, "our regimental officers left them in the rear [thereafter], when going into battle."

Matthews also related the account of a mortally wounded soldier named Ward who asked his "body servant"^{e} Jesse to return to Alabama and convey his final goodbye to his wife. Matthews emphasized that Jesse could easily have run away in the confusion and sought freedom with nearby Federal troops, but he chose to return home—entirely on his own—carrying his master's message.

=== Fragging ===
While fragging—the assassination of unpopular officers by their subordinates—is generally associated with the Vietnam War, incidents of this nature occurred during the Civil War as well. Private Matthews speaks of a "Lieut. Col. [Henry Virtner] Keep" in the 3rd Confederate Infantry Regiment, whom he describes as a "tyrant." Keep was viewed as a martinet by his men after he punished them by ordering them to carry heavy fence rails or wooden poles as they marched; Matthews reports that his soldiers promised that he would not survive his first engagement. Although they did not manage to murder him, they were overjoyed to learn of Keep's departure after the battle.

With regard to his own unit, Matthews says: "I never heard it rumored that any of our officers of the 33rd Alabama were ever shot by any of our men intentionally, for there were no tyrannical officers such as Colonel Keep in the regiment." He says that discontented men who did not believe that they could "get justice" from their regimental officers were usually able to obtain a transfer to another unit.

== Action in Tennessee ==
=== Retreat into Tennessee ===
After withdrawing from Perryville, General Bragg moved south toward Harrodsburg, Kentucky, where he linked up with another Confederate force under Major General Kirby Smith. From here he continued his retreat to Knoxville, Tennessee, where the army drew supplies described as: "flour, corn meal, bacon, fresh beef, rice, salt and the first soap that we had drawn in two months," together with new uniforms and shoes. Here the regiment was rejoined by several previously ill soldiers, who had been left behind at hospitals in Chattanooga at the outset of the Kentucky Campaign.

=== Tragedy on the rails ===
On November 4, 1862, the 33rd Alabama was ordered to board a train which was scheduled to take them to Chattanooga. In a freak accident a few miles south of Cleveland, Tennessee, a large stick of wood fell from the locomotive tender as the train moved rapidly on a downhill grade, breaking the axle of one of the railcars immediately behind it and causing part of the train to derail. Pvt. Matthews reports that when the axle snapped on the boxcar he was in, all the wheels came off and "clogged" under the wheels of the car behind it (occupied by Co. G), causing its separation from the train. Meanwhile, the engine continued to pull the wheel-less B Company car two or three hundred yards down the track before it finally stopped. Several soldiers had been riding on the boxcar roofs: Matthews reported that these were "shook off, like shaking peaches from a tree, and badly jolted when they hit the ground." Others were pinned beneath and within the wreckage; some only escaped by "alighting on their heads."

A total of seventeen men were killed in the disaster, with sixty-seven others maimed; many of these later died from their injuries. Most of the deceased came from Co. G, the "Daleville Blues," including the company commander, Captain Reuben Jackson Cooper. All were buried the next day in a trench dug just southeast of the railroad that was surrounded by a split-rail fence; this remained unmarked and largely forgotten until descendants of the departed erected a monument on the site in November 1989.

=== Battle of Stones River ===
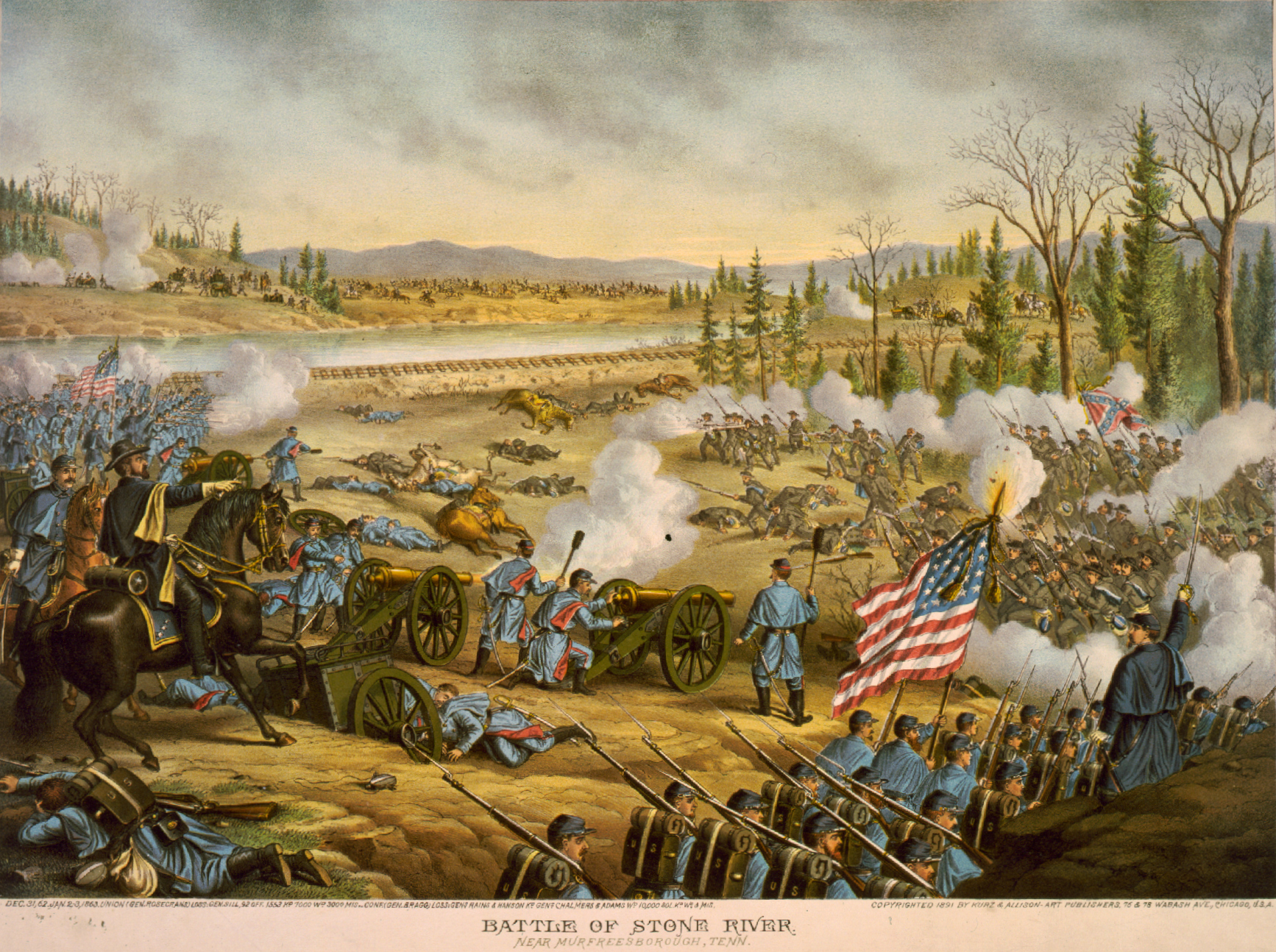
General William Rosecrans leads Federal troops at the Battle of Stones River.

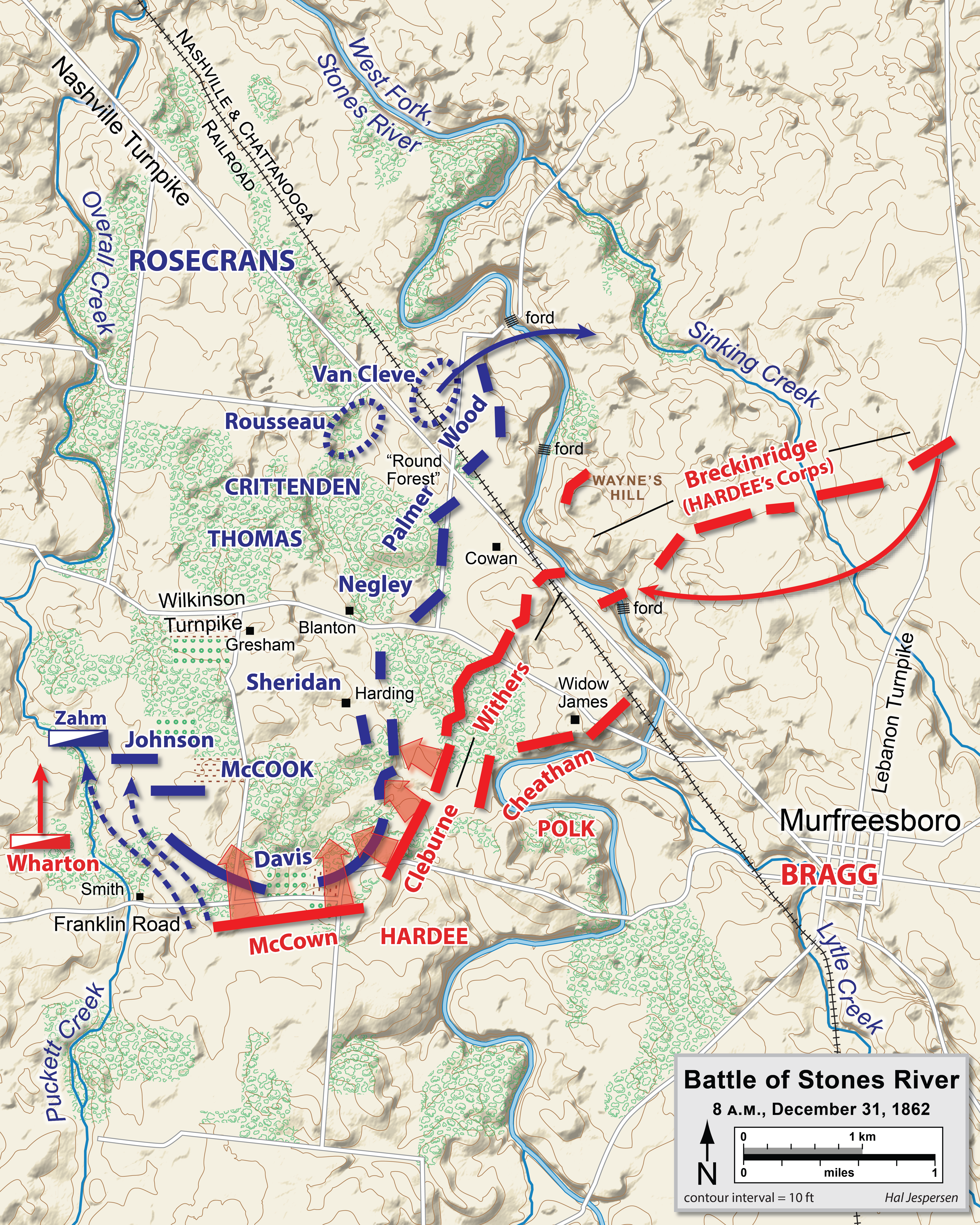
Positions at the commencement of the Battle of Stones River. The 33rd Alabama was with Cleburne's Division, at the bottom left of the map.

Following the Battle of Perryville, the 33rd Alabama—together with the rest of Wood's brigade—was transferred to a new division commanded by Major General Patrick R. Cleburne, under whom the 33rd served for most of the rest of the war. By now Bragg had converted his "wings" into corps; Cleburne's division was assigned to the corps commanded by Lieutenant General William J. Hardee, in what was now officially called the Army of Tennessee. After leaving Chattanooga, General Bragg and his army moved west until they reached the small town of Murfreesboro, Tennessee, 35 miles (56 km) southeast of Union-held Nashville. Private Matthews reports that the 33rd Alabama was tasked to serve as a rear guard for their brigade along the line of march, occasionally skirmishing with pursuing Federal forces while contending with muddy roads during the final portion of their journey.

Knowing that Murfreesboro and the surrounding area were staunchly pro-Southern in sentiment, Bragg felt compelled to make a stand on relatively flat ground north of the city, even though several more-defensible areas lay further to the north and south. The Federal Army of the Cumberland, now under the command of Major General William S. Rosecrans, closed with Bragg in late December 1862, arriving at Murfreesboro on December 29 and moving into position the following day. Following a musical contest between Southern and Federal bands during the evening hours on the 30th, both armies prepared to attack each other at dawn on the 31st. Incredibly, Bragg and Rosecrans had each made plans to assault each other's right flank, at almost the same moment. Hardee's corps—more than 10,000 troops in all— attacked at dawn in a massive wave, hoping to catch their enemy off guard and preoccupied with eating breakfast and other morning activities, just as they had done at Shiloh where they had achieved complete surprise. A ration of whiskey was issued to the troops at 8:00 pm; soon afterwards they bedded down for the night, sleeping on cornstalks in an effort to keep off the soggy ground.

Lieutenant Alfred Moore, the regimental adjutant, describes the action at Stones River and its aftermath in a letter to his mother, Amanda:

On the morning of the 31st, we were formed in line and commenced to move forward. We marched through a large field, and moved to a cedar thicket. Directly [word missing] we got into the woods our skirmishers [word missing] front began to fire. Soon the Yankees came in sight and the [word unintelligible] commenced. Our regiment fell to the ground to protect themselves, and commenced to open fire. The Yankees were lying on the ground in some rocks and poured a steady fire into our ranks. I could hear the balls whistle by me, and see them strike the trees on every side. Our fire soon became too hot for them, and they rose and began to run. The command was given to 'forward,' and we started for them, cheering as we went. As we went on after them, I would for mere curiosity ask some of the wounded Yankees what regiments they belonged to? Some would answer the 38th Illinois, some the 15th Michigan, and different ones of their army. Our men who had poor guns would take good ones from the wounded and dead Yankees, and throw their own away. We ran them a long distance, killing and wounding many, and would have taken a [artillery] battery in our front, but General Wood halted us, thinking we were too much crowded together. We then went back to the ordinance trains to get some more ammunition, as we had exhausted all we had.

After getting some more ammunition and resting a short time, we again moved forward. We saw a brigade of Yankees in an open field, moving slowly 'by the left flank' and seemingly taking no notice of us. On this account we thought them prisoners and did not at first fire on them, but we soon found out our mistake and fired on them, killing a good many of them. Soon a battery nearby opened up on us; we charged it, but lost a good many men and were unable to take it, as they had a large number to sustain them, and we were considerably weaker in numbers. We again went to get some more ammunition and rested, and again the third time moved forward to the attack. This time we drove the enemy from their position as before [and] charged another battery, but as before were unable to take it, as it was in a strong position. It was now about 2PM, and having been in the fight ever since sunrise, we did not return again to the fight. We drove the Yankees a long ways, and slept that night on the battlefield. Where we slept, the Yankees were lying dead all around and a good many wounded ones, but most of the wounded had been carried to the hospital. Our men found a great many things the Yankees left on the field. A great many knapsacks were left by them piled up before going into the battle, and our men took all of these ... They [the Federal soldiers] are nicely fixed up, and have everything you can imagine ...

On the first of January our brigade was ordered across [words unintelligible] in front of the Yankees to find out their position. We marched a good distance, and the Yankees opened a heavy fire on us. We lost a good many men in [the] field out of the brigade, and then fell back to our former position without firing a single gun ... We lost in the whole engagement 14 killed and 87 wounded in the regiment. We had about 320 men in the fight. Our loss was not so much as it was at Perryville, though we fought longer at Murfreesboro. On the night of the third, about 12 o'clock, our brigade was withdrawn from the front and we commenced to move from Murfreesboro.

Confederate defensive works at Tullahoma, Tennessee

Private Matthews reported that when the battle first commenced, haze had obscured the field so much that visibility was limited to about fifty feet. He reported that during the initial charge, the Federals abandoned their "breakfast[s] on the fire," together with tents, wagons, knapsacks, foodstuffs and other supplies. Blaming "inferior powder" for causing many of their Enfield rifles to fail at Perryville and now here, he indicates that most of his comrades threw away those weapons in favor of Federal Springfield Model 1861 rifles they found on the battlefield. Matthews equally writes that many soldiers were trading in their original-issue cedar canteens (from their Ft. McRee days) for the "cloth covered, block tin oval shaped Yankee canteen[s]" they found. Federal blankets, shelter halves, hats (which Matthews described as "good") and overcoats were also prized by the 33rd Alabama—those who could not find them on the field, would purchase them from others who had extras.

Stones River ended on January 2, 1863, as a Federal victory: though Bragg had inflicted severe losses on Rosecrans' army, he had been unable to drive it from the field. With fresh Union reinforcements threatening to give Rosecrans an overwhelming advantage for a future attack, Bragg chose to retreat to Tullahoma, Tennessee.

=== Smallpox and snowballs ===
During the 33rd's time in Tullahoma, several members of Company I (from Dale County) contracted smallpox, apparently from a soldier who had been on furlough to Columbus, Georgia. The entire regiment was ordered into quarantine, which entailed moving away from the rest of the army and into a nearby creek swamp, where they established camp on high ground and waited out the epidemic. Those who died there were buried in the swamp by other members of their mess, but were not accorded the military honors usually given to those who died in camp or in battle.

Once this enforced isolation was revoked, The 33rd celebrated by taking the offensive in an entirely new kind of war. Private Matthews reports:

After three or four weeks, quarantine was raised, where our sensations and actions may be compared to the actions of a confined chicken turned out of a coop; when we realized we were at liberty, we began snowballing each other, a sport we had been practicing freely while confined while there was any snow on the ground. Soon afterward adjoining companies had snowball fights, then each member of the [other] nine companies threw a few balls at members of Company I, invading the tents to get to hit them after they had fought for some time from the outside. We did not go near the smallpox tent, and Company I assured us that those lives of the mess had gone to the swamp. Then the regiment formed in line with Col. Sam Adams in command, and after filling our haversacks with snowballs charged the 16th Alabama, the 32nd and 35th Mississippi and three [other] Confederate regiments, but they all combined against us and ran us back to our camp in the swamp, not permitting any of us to surrender, but continued to pelt us with snowballs, some swearing at us and saying we were all sick with smallpox, and to get back to our reservation; however, all had learned that we were out of quarantine and that they need no longer be afraid of us.

After being removed from quarantine, the regiment witnessed the hanging of a Federal spy, then moved on to Wartrace, where they went into camp for a time.

=== Camp life ===
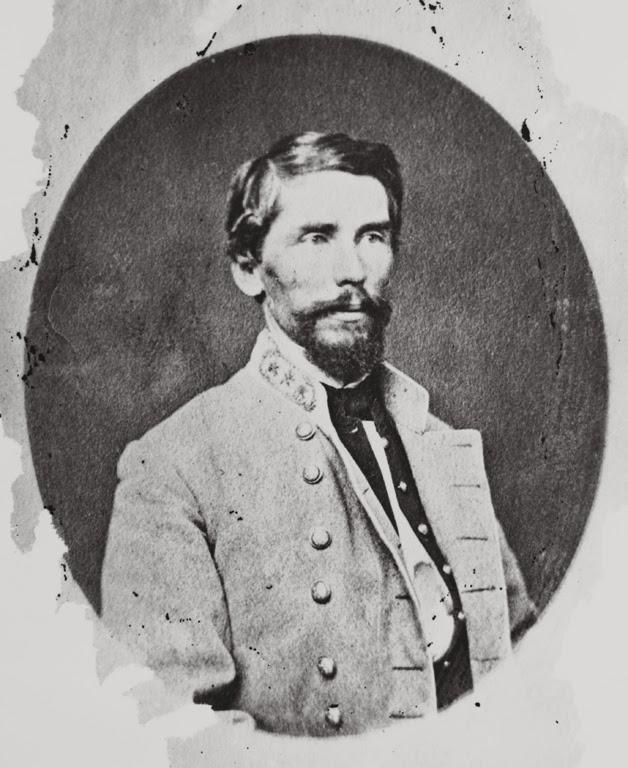
Maj. Gen. Patrick Cleburne, the "Stonewall of the West," in whose division the 33rd fought from Murfreesboro to Franklin

Although the 33rd was taking a rest at Wartrace, not all of its time was spent leisurely. Its new divisional commander, General Cleburne, drilled his men and held marksmanship competitions together with frequent readiness and equipment inspections. Cleburne's previous record of success went over well with his new troops; he insisted on weapons being clean and well-maintained at all times, and also that his soldiers attend to their own personal hygiene to the best extent possible. Cleburne encouraged competitiveness between his companies and regiments: the man who reported to his company's guard mount with the cleanest weapon and best appearance was excused from guard duty for that shift, while at the regimental level, the five troops with the best rifles were excused from duty and instead formed into a special reserve to take the place of guards who became sick or were removed for other reasons. A new blue-and-white regimental flag was issued, with "Perryville" and "Murfreesboro" written on it in large white letters, the original one having been virtually destroyed at those two engagements.

In camp, soldiers of the regiment occupied themselves in various ways: "we carried wood, water, cooked, washed our clothes, cleaned our guns, conversed, wrote letters to our people at home, tussled, ran foot races, jumped, boxed or jollied each other in friendly ways; some recruits loafed or laid around and grieved of home until sent off to the hospital or died in camp. Other jolly souls sang songs, especially at night; others played various games of chance: cards, dice, kino or other games. We ... fished in creeks or rivers or went in bathing, and some frequently attended religious services ... Green bandsmen near us making discordant noise on their tin horns caused some of the boys to swear, though we liked the music after they had learned to play."

Matthews reports that Wartrace was the last place where his regiment used the wall tents they had been issued at the beginning of their service. Once they left there, he says, the tents were either "captured or burned." A sergeant assigned to the unit managed to abscond with all the pocketwatches in the regiment, whereupon he promptly deserted to the Federals.

=== The 18th Alabama Battalion ===
Early in 1863, the 33rd Alabama learned that a battalion of partisan rangers from Jackson County, Alabama, in the northern part of the state, was being "attached" to them for administrative and command purposes, without losing its identity. Recruited in the summer of 1862, the 1st Partisan Rangers Battalion was originally mounted and intended for local service. Composed of five companies that were later consolidated into three, the 18th was attached to the 33rd Alabama in January 1863 (after previously serving under General Nathan Bedford Forrest) and fought with the 33rd thereafter, while still remaining a separate organization. Commanded by Major John H. Gibson, it was also known as Gibson's Battalion.

== Chickamauga ==
=== Tullahoma Campaign ===
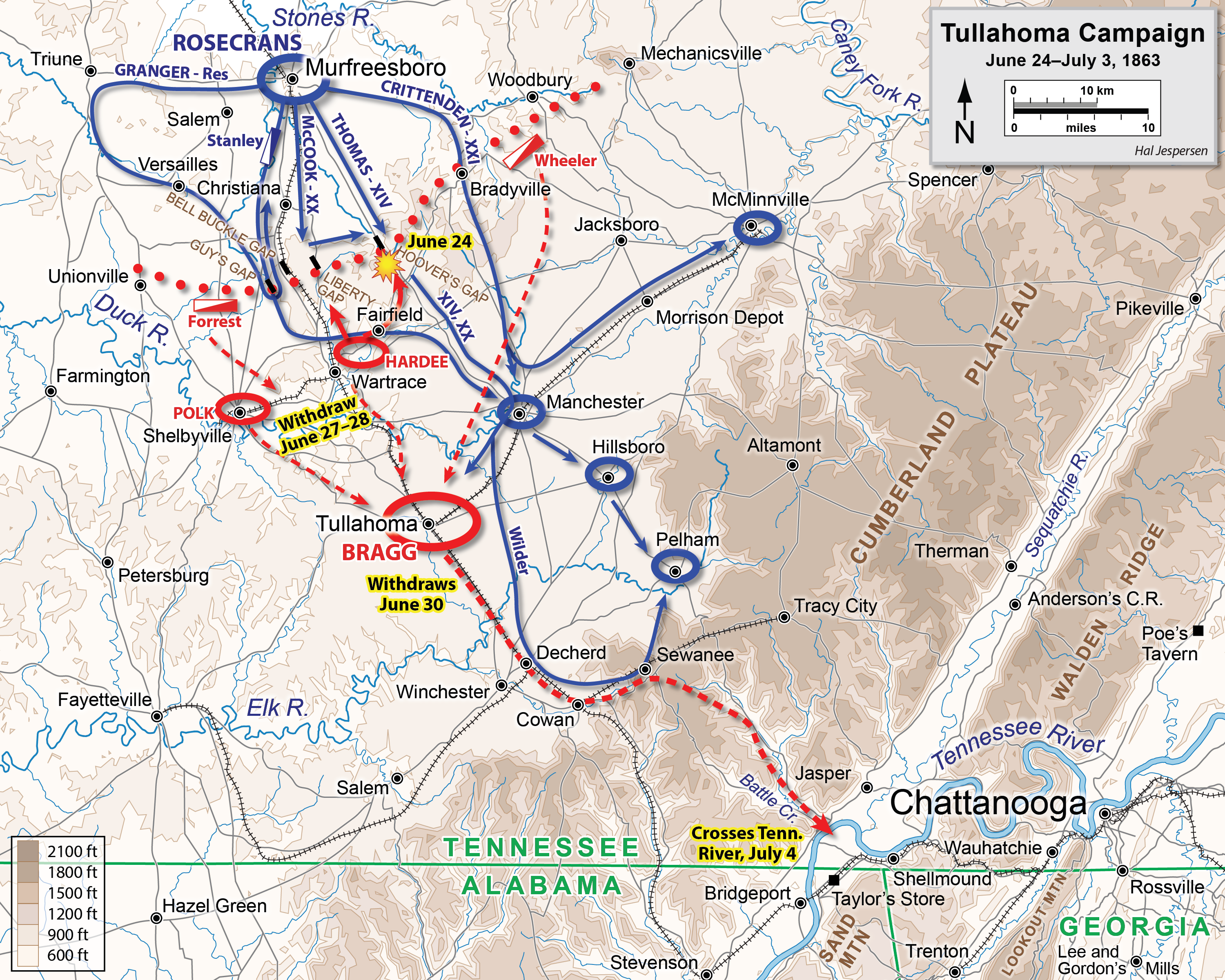
Map of the Tullahoma Campaign: June–July 1862

On June 24, 1863, the Federal Army of the Cumberland opened its Tullahoma Campaign in central Tennessee. This lasted until July 3, and resulted in Bragg's dislodgement from strong defensive positions at Tullahoma and nearby areas including Wartrace. Hearing the Federals open fire on the 24th, the 33rd Alabama cooked three days' rations of flour, beef, bacon and corn meal, then marched back to the main army at Tullahoma, which was evacuated around June 30. Bragg moved south toward Chattanooga, a strategically valuable city that was considered the "gateway" to Georgia and its vital railway center of Atlanta. Halting at a big spring just outside the town of Harrison, Tennessee, the 33rd was initially ordered to guard the river crossings at this point. In September, the regiment was ordered to evacuate this position, and moved into Chattanooga. From Chattanooga they moved to Lafayette, Georgia, thence through Dug Gap in nearby Pigeon Mountain, where Private Matthews reports that the regiment moved "Indian file, one behind another, crawling under, around and over, trees, logs and brush that had been cut and fell on the road through the gap; at times in [a] deep cut in the road full of brush and logs with a high wall on each side ..." The regiment was shelled by nearby Federal troops as they continued on their journey, but managed to make it to McLemore Cove.

=== Engagement at Chickamauga ===
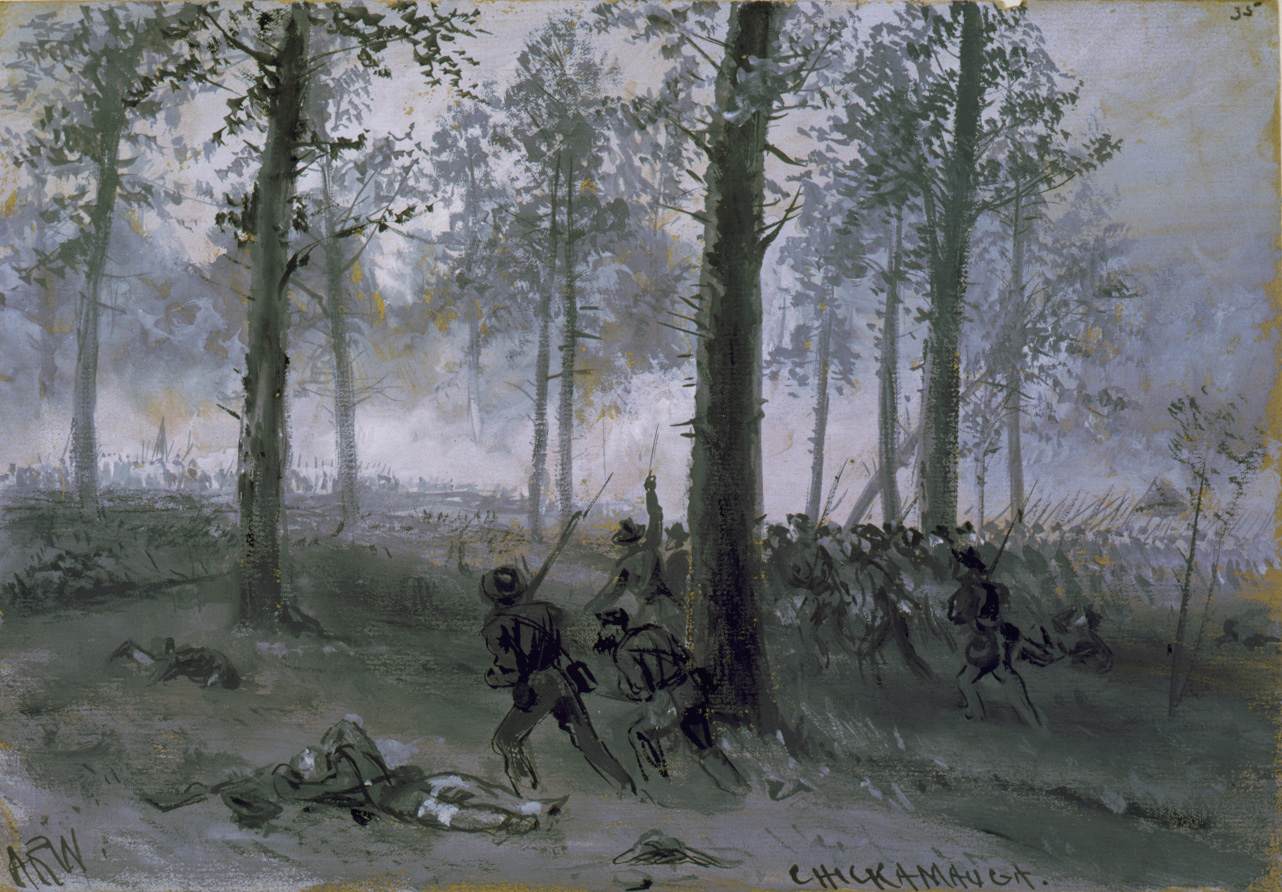
Confederate troops advancing at Chickamauga, by Alfred Waud

Having forced Bragg to evacuate Chattanooga on September 6 through a series of skillful maneuvers, Rosecrans ordered his army to advance along three different roads into northwestern Georgia in pursuit of the Army of Tennessee. With the Federals divided and unable to support each other due to the mountainous terrain, Bragg chose to concentrate on one Union corps, the XIV Corps, which had advanced through the same gap taken by the 33rd at Pigeon Mountain (and adjacent passes), and was moving toward Lafayette. An abortive assault launched by Cleyburne's and Hindman's divisions at Davis's Cross Roads allowed the Federals to escape to safety, so Bragg now turned north, where Rosecran's main force was rapidly concentrating at Lee and Gordon's Mill along Chickamauga Creek. Having been promised three extra divisions—including two led by the renowned Lieutenant General James Longstreet—Bragg decided to attack Rosecrans' army. Skirmishing commenced on September 18, with the main battle opening on September 19. This engagement marked one of the very few major contests of the war in which the Confederate force outnumbered the Federals: 65,000 to 60,000.

Bragg's plan was for the Confederates to push past the Federals at Chickamauga Creek, then move north toward Chattanooga. If executed correctly, this maneuver would force Rosecrans to give battle against superior numbers under unfavorable conditions, or to withdraw. Unfortunately for Bragg things did not go exactly as he had intended, and by the afternoon of the 19th his forces were strung out along a densely wooded battlefront roughly 5 miles (8.0 km) in length. With the Federals putting up a terrific fight and showing no disposition to give way, Bragg ordered the 33rd Alabama and the rest of Cleburne's division (which had been on the left side of his army up to this point) to move north to the Youngblood Farm, near the far right flank. Though most of the fighting had shifted further south over the course of the afternoon, Bragg understood that the main effort had to come at the opposite end of the field if he was to win. He still believed he could turn the Federal flank in the north, thereby obtaining control over the Lafayette Road and positioning himself between the Federals and Chattanooga, which was his key objective.

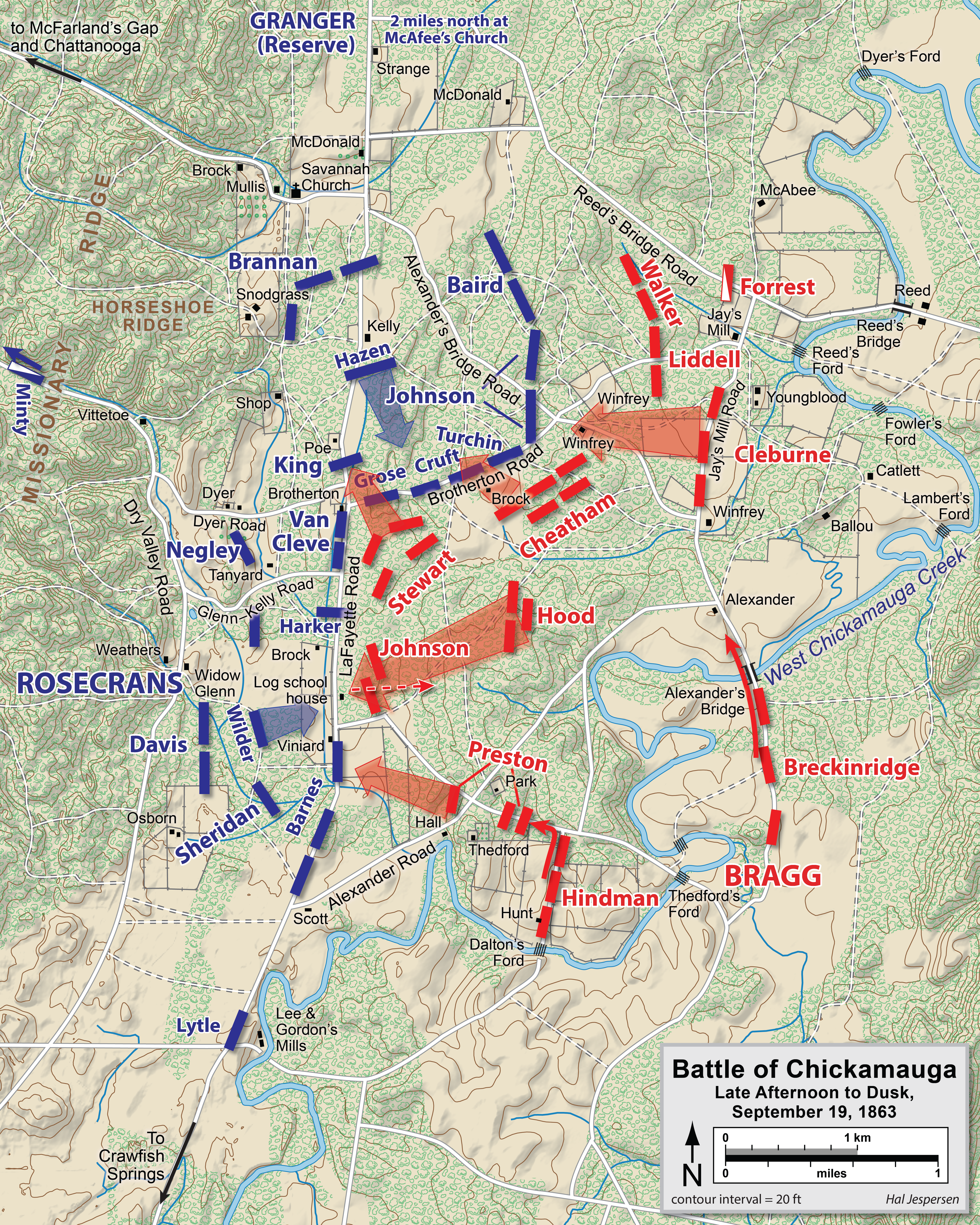
Cleburne's night attack at Battle of Chickamauga, involving the 33rd Alabama. Cleburne's position lies near the top of the Confederate line, which is shown in red.

=== Night assault at Winfrey Field ===
Wading Chickamauga creek after stripping off their shoes, pants and socks, the 33rd Alabama reached the Youngblood farm around 5:30 pm. After reporting to General Polk, Cleburne expected to be ordered to bed his men down for the evening, as night combat was extremely rare during the Civil War. However, to his immense astonishment, Cleburne received orders to form his troops into line in the fading light, and prepare to launch an immediate assault on the Federals to his front. The 33rd Alabama and the rest of Wood's Brigade took center position in the attack formation, with Polk's Brigade to their right, and Deshler's brigade to their left. Cleburne began his advance at 6:00 pm, through a tiny meadow locally known as Winfrey Field. This plot was described as being "200-300 yards in depth, and long enough to nearly cover the length of his brigade.". The 18th Alabama advanced to the left of the 33rd, while the 16th Alabama and the 45th, 32nd and 15th Mississippi regiments advanced to its right. Three artillery batteries were placed in support, though in the gathering darkness they had potential to inflict as much damage on their friends as on the enemy. This enemy consisted of the 5th Kentucky, 1st Ohio and 32nd Indiana Infantry Regiments (belonging to Baldwin's and Willich's brigades of the Federal Army), who awaited them just behind a split rail fence near the treeline.

The 33rd and its sisters advanced cautiously toward the Federals, who quickly opened up on them from the far side of the field. At one point about halfway across, the 16th Alabama suddenly halted; Adams ordered the 33rd to stop, as well. The two regiments resumed their advance after about ten minutes or so, though in the darkness they now had to deal with stragglers firing on them from behind, as well as the enemy to their front. One incident of friendly fire claimed the life of Lieutenant Alfred Moore^{g}, who was accidentally shot in the neck from behind by a straggler. A few companies of the 33rd began to waver, but Adams quickly corralled them and got them back into the fight. With the attack now stalling, artillery batteries were brought up in the darkness together with supporting troops under Brigadier General John Jackson; these finally drove the Federals back. The 33rd Alabama crossed the Federal breastworks, heading straight for the nearby 6th Indiana.

At this point, with their assault on the verge of success, the commander of the 16th Alabama suddenly ordered his regiment to retreat, upon which they scampered back toward the safety of their own lines. Even though his left flank was now exposed, Colonel Adams chose to close with the 6th Indiana in the pitch-dark woods, where savage hand-to-hand fighting ensued before the Hoosiers finally withdrew. Winfrey Field caught fire behind them from the artillery blasts, though the Rebel shells were mostly sailing over the defenders' heads. Friendly units were now firing into each other in the darkness, lit up only by muzzle flashes and the blaze in the field, which threatened to consume the wounded of each army who lay there. Mass confusion quickly set in on both sides, and although the Confederates achieved some success their attack ultimately ground to a halt, leaving the Federals in control of La Fayette Road. Undeterred by this setback, Bragg decided to attack again the next morning, first in the north and then moving southward as the assault progressed, hoping to "roll up" the Union forces.^{h}

Private Matthews reports that the men of the 33rd slept that night "in line of battle in the woods, without taking off any of our belongings except shoes and blankets." He reports that the regiment was resupplied with ammunition from a wagon that came up to their position; they also drew rations of crackers and bacon for their breakfast the next morning. Several men from the regiment had failed to remove their ramrods from their rifles as they fired them during the engagement; according to Matthews, these were stuck in trees as high as twenty feet above the ground; others were buried partway in the soil.

=== Assault on La Fayette Road ===
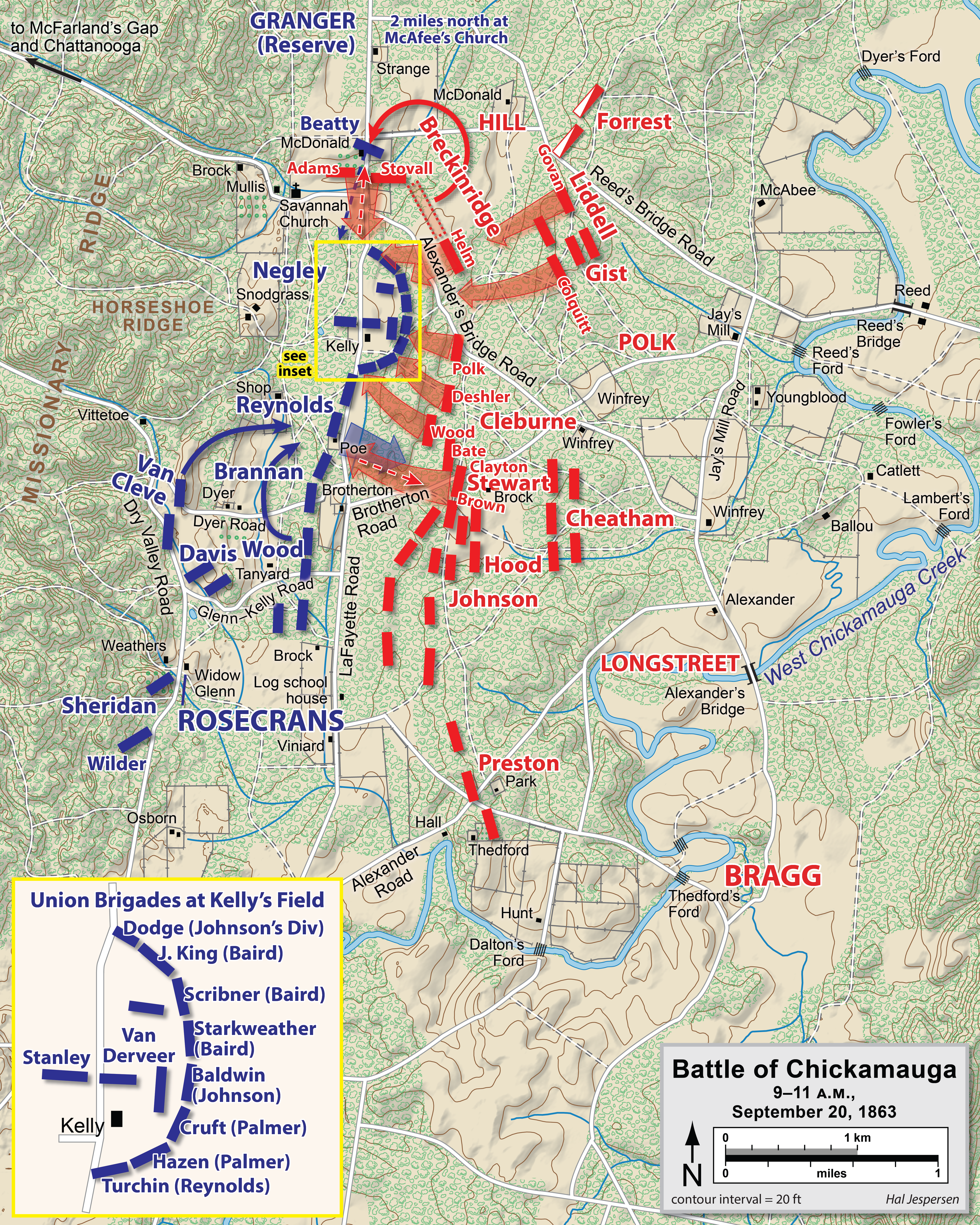
Cleburne's assault at Kelly Field on 20 September

Miscommunication between General Bragg and his subordinates, together with blunders by General Polk, relegated the 33rd and its sister regiments to a series of futile assaults on the Federal left flank on September 20. At 7:25 that morning, as his men were eating breakfast, Cleburne received orders from Polk to attack the Federal line in a new location known as Kelly Field, in conjunction with troops of Brigadier General John C. Breckinridge, a former Vice President of the United States who had sided with the South. Wood's brigade had become tangled with Stewart's division (part of Longstreet's "wing" of the army), and none of the attackers or their officers realized that they were charging directly into six Federal divisions. General Wood's brigade became separated from the other attacking units, and quickly found itself on its own, attacking the Federals on high ground against overwhelming odds.

The 33rd Alabama began its advance about 10:00 am, in conjunction with the nearby 16th Alabama. The latter regiment quickly took cover after the first volley from the Union line, while the 33rd continued to advance until they reached a small ravine, where they sheltered for nearly an hour until ordered to move forward again. The two regiments now moved to a point about 275 yards from the Union line, when the 33rd was suddenly hit with murderous artillery and rifle fire from its right flank. Completely bereft of support from either side, the 33rd continued to advance, ultimately achieving something no other Confederate regiment in that sector managed to do: it crossed the La Fayette Road, General Bragg's main objective. However, it was forced to retreat almost as soon as it had done so, having lost 16 killed and 133 wounded out of the 219 men who had started the assault.

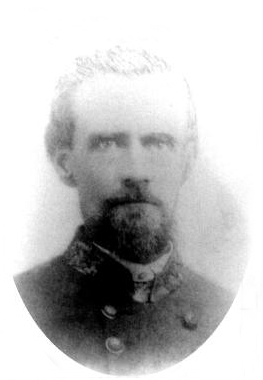
Brigadier General Mark Lowrey, who became 33rd's Brigade Commander after Chickamagua.

Confusion and miscommunication were not confined to the Southern forces. A botched order issued by General Rosecrans opened a large gap in another part of the Federal line: Longstreet quickly exploited it, turning the Federal right flank and crippling their defense. Rosecrans and most of his army fled the field, and only a desperate last-minute stand by Major General George H. Thomas saved the Union army from complete annihilation. The 33rd Alabama took part in a renewed assault on Kelly Field late in the afternoon, but due to its diminished numbers, it played little appreciable role in the final rout of Federal forces in that sector. The Federals retreated all the way back to Chattanooga, where they awaited an immediate attack by Bragg's exultant army. Bragg, however, threw away the greatest victory in his career by dallying on the battlefield to collect left-behind equipment and tend to his wounded, rather than quickly pursuing and destroying the demoralized Federals. Upon reaching Chattanooga, Rosecrans' army quickly improved upon previous Confederate fortifications there; this ensured their survival and the ultimate defeat of Bragg's forces.

Matthews writes that the regiment drew more crackers and bacon that evening, sent their canteens to be filled, then "slept soundly, after the tension of the last two days." The next day was spent burying the dead, with men buried either singly or in pairs: "each wrapped in his blanket with his hat over his face." Major Gibson was mortally wounded during the fighting of the 20th.

The final casualty for the 33rd Alabama at Chickamauga was their longtime brigade commander, Brigadier General Wood. Never mentioned in Cleburne's or anyone else's after-action reports, his performance during the assault at Winfrey Field remains shrouded in controversy. Privately accused of cowardace in the face of the enemy, and reportedly threatened with a court-martial by Cleburne, Wood resigned his commission soon after the battle ended, and returned to his law practice in Alabama. Command of his brigade passed to Brigadier General Mark Lowrey, a Southern Baptist minister who was known as the Confederacy's "Preacher General."

== Chattanooga to Ringgold Gap ==
=== The Siege of Chattanooga ===
The Battles for Chattanooga. The 33rd Alabama and the rest of Cleburne's Division were on the far right flank of the Confederate line.

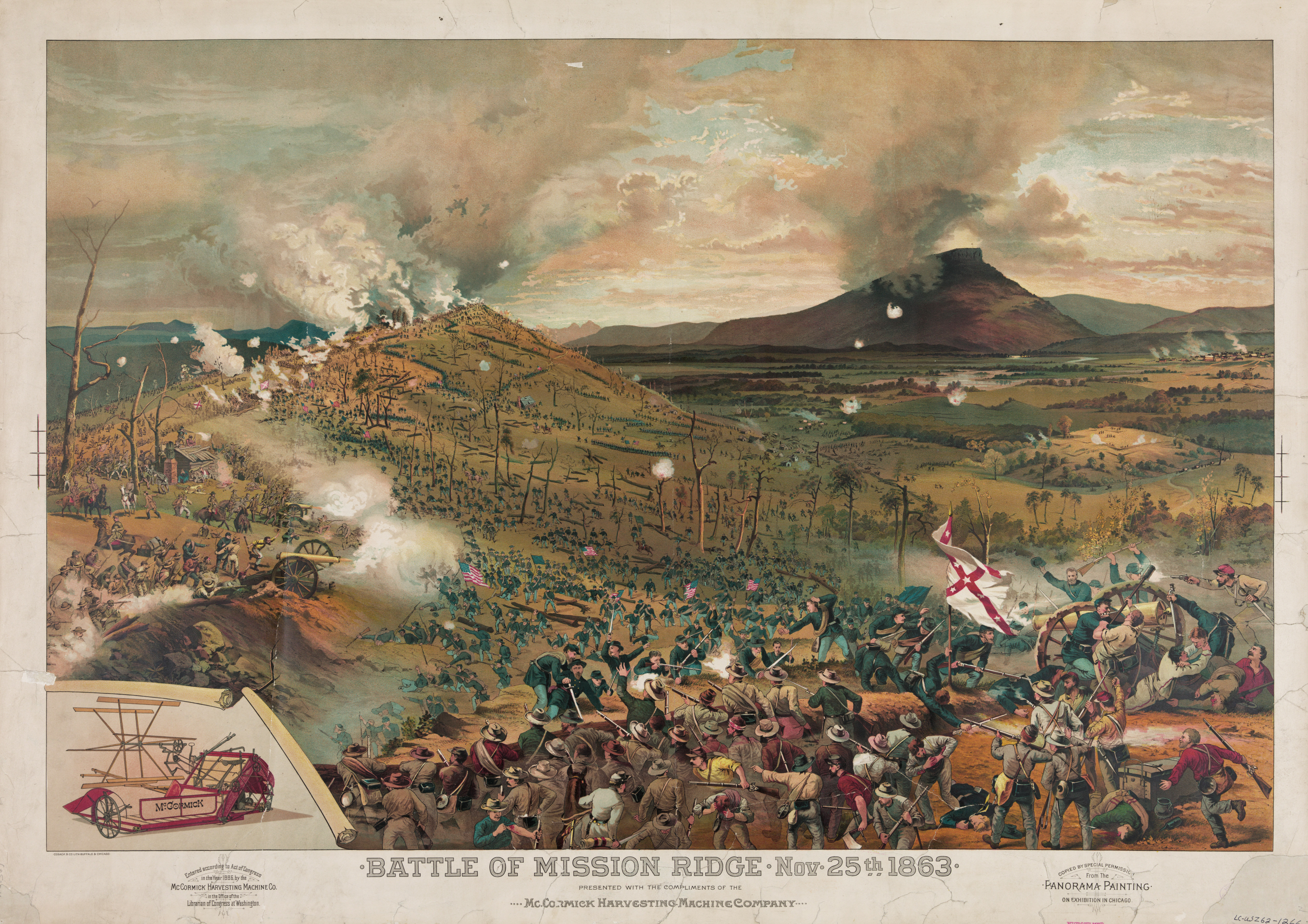
The Battle of Missionary Ridge. The 33rd Alabama fought here during the Battles of Chattanooga.

Following the debacle at Chickamauga and his subsequent failure to prevent the routed Union forces from escaping to Chattanooga, Bragg placed that city under siege after hearing that his foes had just six days of food remaining. Entrenching his forces atop Lookout Mountain and Missionary Ridge overlooking the city and the Tennessee River, Bragg soon learned that he would be facing a new opponent: Ulysses S. Grant. Fresh from his victory at Vicksburg, Grant had been ordered to take command of all Federal forces in the region; his first action upon arriving was to remove Rosecrans and replace him with George Thomas, who had saved the Union army at Chickamauga. With 50,000 new reinforcements to assist him, Grant opened a so-called "Cracker Line" to the starving Federals in the city at the Battle of Brown's Ferry; here the 15th Alabama, another regiment recruited from the same part of the state as the 33rd, was driven from the field after being outnumbered and overwhelmed by attacking Federals.

The 33rd Alabama dug in on the west end of Missionary Ridge on November 22, behind a vineyard at its base. Rifle pits were built, and guards rotated there every 24 hours; those not on guard duty set to work clearing all the vegetation from the west slope of the ridge, chopping the trees so that the tops fell toward Chattanooga, creating a natural barrier of tangled tree limbs. Matthews reports that the removal of these trees allowed the cold autumn breezes to chill the troops on the ridge, since the Southerners had nothing but small tents to break the wind. He reports gazing in wonder at the valley below him, where the campfires of thousands of Federal soldiers "[showed] picturesquely at night." A large siege gun was hauled up Lookout Mountain to shell the Union camps and Chattanooga; Matthews recalled that "... at the flash of the gun at night, some soldiers attracted out attention by yelling and watching the long flight and bursting of the shells, [which] were especially attractive to us while standing, squatting or sitting around our camp fires." He says that rations, which had heretofore been plentiful, were "short" during this time.

At this point, Bragg chose to divide his army: Longstreet's 4,000 soldiers were ordered to move north to Knoxville to deal with a separate Federal force there under Ambrose Burnside. On November 22, he ordered General Cleburne to take his division, including the 33rd Alabama, together with another division under General Simon B. Buckner to assist. Seeing movement in the Southern lines, General Grant ordered Federal forces to attack near a small rise called Orchard Knob; their success, though limited in scope, led Bragg to recall Cleburne (who was in the process of loading his troops onto their trains); he took up a position just behind his former works which had been occupied by other Southerners after their departure the day before.

=== Holding Tunnel Hill ===
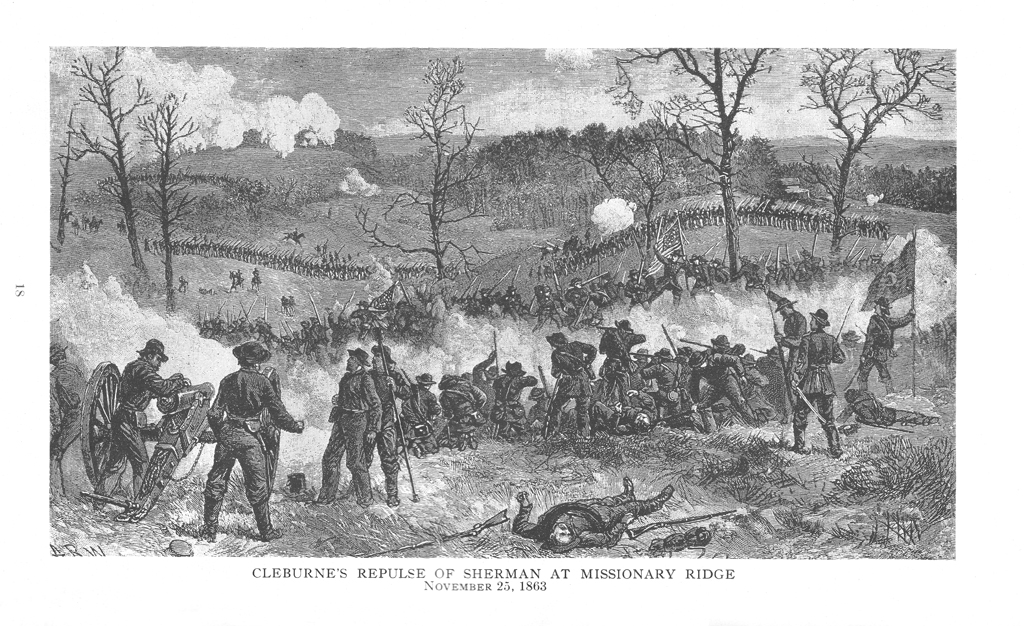
The repulse of Sherman's attack on Missionary Ridge by Cleburne's division, including the 33rd Alabama

Having successfully lifted the Siege of Chattanooga, General Grant now resolved on a double envelopment of Bragg's army. Major General William T. Sherman was ordered to attack with 20,000 men from the north along Missionary Ridge, while Major General Joseph Hooker was directed to attack from the south along Lookout Mountain, overwhelm the Southern forces there, then continue on to cut off Bragg's retreat while Sherman and Thomas pummeled him from the north and west. The contest kicked off on the morning of November 24, as Hooker drove Confederate forces from Lookout Mountain in the so-called "Battle Above the Clouds," while Sherman crossed the Tennessee River and took up positions along what he thought was the far edge of Missionary Ridge—only to learn that he had occupied a nearby hill, called Billy Goat Hill, instead. The 33rd Alabama, entrenched atop the south end of Missionary Ridge near Bragg's headquarters, heard the sounds of battle on Lookout Mountain, but could not see the action due to a dense fog that had enveloped it.

Realizing that his right flank was vulnerable to Sherman's impending attack, Bragg ordered Cleburne at 2pm to double-time from the southern to the northernmost portion of his line—just as he had done at Chickamauga—and take up a new position opposite Sherman at a place called "Tunnel Hill," where a tunnel of the East Tennessee and Georgia railroad passed through Missionary Ridge. Lowrey's brigade, including the 33rd, dug in to the south of the tunnel, but "only skirmishing" took place on that day.

Ordered to attack at dawn on November 25, General Sherman delayed until about 7am, when he sent his skirmishers forward. The real attack did not begin until sometime between 10 and 10:30 am. With other units moving onto the ridge to his left, Cleburne shifted Lowrey's Brigade to a spur projecting from the ridge, just north of the tunnel. Advancing into murderous fire, the Federals came to within eighty yards of the Southern positions before a furious Confederate counterattack forced them back, leading Sherman to call off the attack. Cleburne indicated that the brunt of the battle was borne by Smith's Texas Brigade and three Arkansas regiments in Gowan's Brigade; the 33rd Alabama saw "heavy skirmishing," but did not play a major role since the Federals never approached closer than 100-200 yards to their sector of the line. Cleburne's men had done their job, capturing eight enemy flags and 500 prisoners.

Just then, disaster struck. Further south along the center of Bragg's line, Federal troops under General Thomas smashed through Confederate positions at the base of the ridge, sweeping up the hill and driving Bragg's men before them. With his army disintegrating before his eyes, Bragg ordered Cleburne to hold the Federals off long enough to let the rest of his men escape. The 33rd Alabama attacked approaching skirmishers in the gathering darkness, allowing the remainder of Bragg's army to cross Chickamauga Creek to the east and retreat into Georgia. Since his division had held more-or-less together during the rout, Cleburne now found his regiments—including the 33rd Alabama—serving as the rearguard of the Army of Tennessee.

=== Ringgold Gap—the "wall of fire" ===
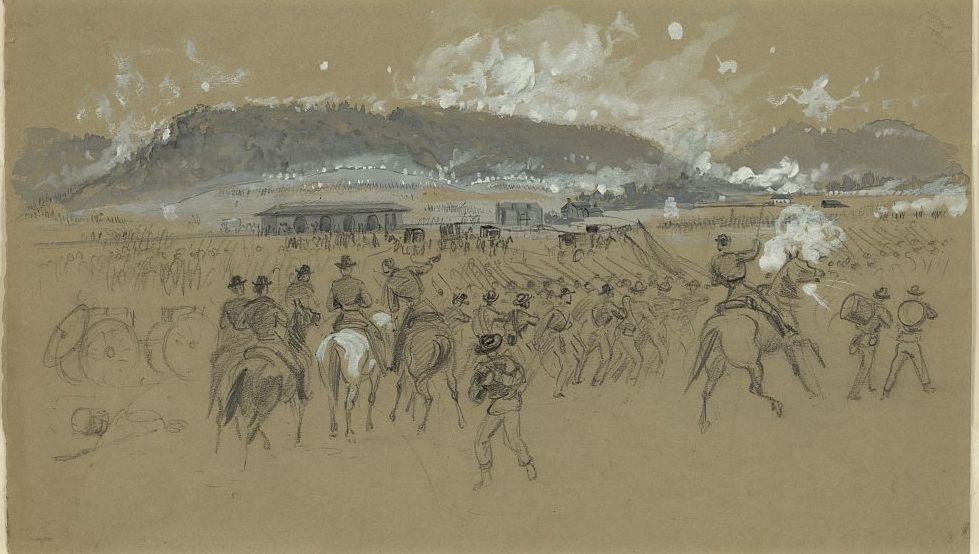
The Battle of Ringgold Gap from Hooker's perspective. The gap itself is between the center mountain and the one on the right. The 33rd Alabama was atop the center mountain, about halfway between its middle and the gap.

As his army continued to retreat, General Bragg became concerned by the deep mud slowing his supply trains as he passed through the mountains near the town of Ringgold. Fearful that pursuing Federals would catch up and destroy them—and with them, his army—Bragg ordered Cleburne to "hold this position at all hazards." The 33rd Alabama crossed the waist-deep, icy Chickamauga Creek on November 27 stripped from the waist down, "as the cold wind was stinging our exposed anatomy." Finding hot ashes from other regiments' campfires, the Alabamians dried themselves and put their clothes back on, then slept beside the creek bank on the frozen ground. As the rest of their division moved on the next day, the 33rd was left with elements of the 45th Alabama and some of Joseph Wheeler's cavalry to guard the creek against the oncoming Federals. Advance Federal elements skirmished with them as the 33rd and Wheeler's Cavalry slowly backtracked toward Ringgold Gap, turning several times to fire, retreating a short distance, then turning to fire again.

Meanwhile, in the gap itself, Cleburne deployed his division in the face of the oncoming Federals. With barely 4,000 men and only two cannon to hold off Joseph Hooker's 16,000 attacking troops, Cleburne arranged his troops across both sides of the narrow pass, ordering them to conceal themselves from view and wait for his signal. Thirty minutes later the 33rd and their friends finally backed into the gap; Matthews reports that the other regiments had done such a good job of concealing themselves that he and his friends never noticed them until they had passed their positions. The 33rd was ordered to take its place with the rest of their brigade in the center atop White Oak Ridge, on the pass's northern side. They arrived just in time; one witness of the battle later said: "two minutes [more] would have been too late."

When Hooker's lead elements entered the mountain pass, Cleburne allowed them to get to within fifty yards of his men before ordering them to open fire. Reeling from the first volleys, the astonished Federals fell back, but quickly regrouped and mounted one furious counterattack after another, seeking first to turn Cleburne's right flank (where the 33rd Alabama was), then his left. Each renewed assault ran into a withering Confederate response, described by one history as "a wall of fire;" one of Cleburne's regiments exhausted its ammunition, and resorted to throwing rocks before the reserve came up and relieved them. Ringgold Gap became a slaughterhouse over the next four hours as Hooker fed regiment after regiment into the fray, only to see each thrown back with severe losses; Private Sam Watkins of the 1st Tennessee Infantry described the gap as having "the appearance of a roof of a house, shingled with dead Yankees ... From the foot to the top of the hill was covered with the slain, all lying on their faces ... The ground was piled with dead Yankees; they were lying in heaps." Once his columns had reached safety further south in Dalton, Bragg ordered Cleburne to pull back; he withdrew his men, and Hooker took possession of the pass around 2 PM. In the midst of all the carnage, the 33rd Alabama had lost only one man; their division as a whole had lost only twenty killed and 201 wounded, while holding off a Federal force four times their number for nearly five hours.

At Ringgold Gap, Cleburne and his men became the stuff of legend; the entire division received the Thanks of the Confederate Congress for their performance at this engagement. But the war was far from over, as the Alabamians and their friends soon learned.

== The savage waltz ==
=== Wintering in Georgia ===
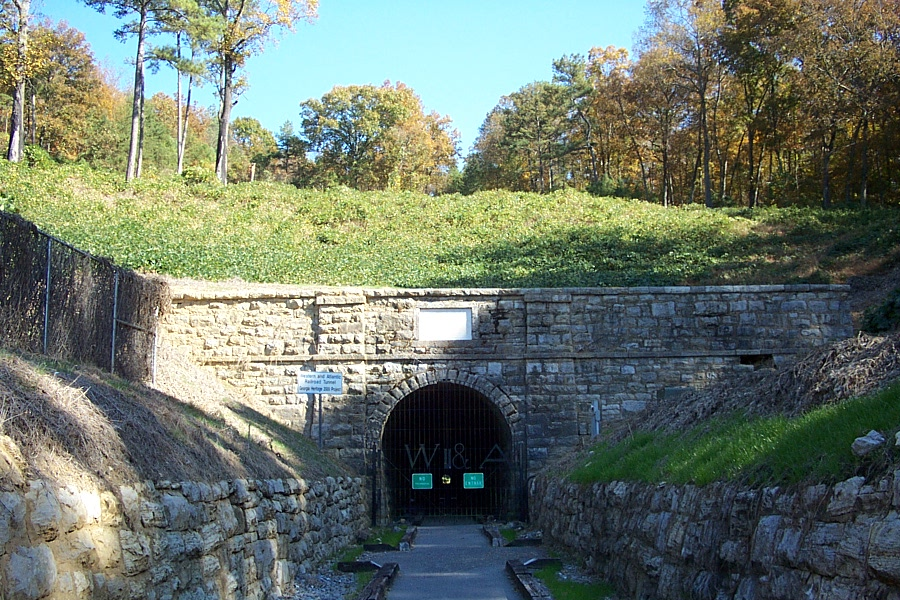
Civil War era railroad tunnel at Tunnel Hill. The 33rd Alabama occupied several crude log cabins on the hill above this tunnel in the winter of 1863–64.

Having safely withdrawn to Dalton, Georgia, General Bragg directed Cleburne to camp at nearby Tunnel Hill, a town bearing the same name as the spot he had defended atop Missionary Ridge. Private Matthews reports that the 33rd Alabama was given "some cabins ... above the tunnel ... some were of round oak poles, others of split oak log, their cracks daubed with clay." Captured shelter halves were used as doors, and the men wintered there as best they could. He writes that those who died here were buried nearby; the regiment accompanied them to their final resting place "with arms [rifles] reversed, and sounded taps; however, [we] did not always fire blank cartridges from our guns, for fear of exciting other sick men in camp." Though they worried about the nearly worthless currency they were being paid in, "there was not as much complaint as one might suppose, as all realized that the [Confederate] Government was doing all it could for us." Matthews blamed "hospital rats" for most of the grumbling, and observed that troops in these winter quarters played cards, dominoes, dice or keno; those who had a dollar, said he, could go to minstrel shows. Not everyone in the camp had the best interests of their comrades at heart: "two or more sharpers," said he, accosted soldiers doing various chores and seek to con them out of their earnings. One regiment was assigned to guard duty every day; whenever the 33rd Alabama drew this duty, they packed up their gear and marched a mile or so to the front lines, leaving behind their sick and a guard over their other property.

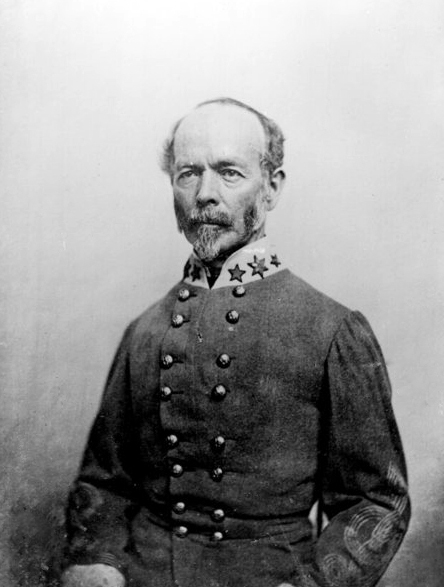
Joseph E. Johnston, who took command of the Army of Tennessee on December 27, 1863.

On December 2, 1863, The 33rd Alabama and their comrades in the Army of Tennessee learned that they were getting a new commander: Braxton Bragg, who had led the army since the Kentucky Campaign, had resigned his position. General Hardee was given temporary charge of the force, but on December 27 General Joseph Johnston, a veteran leader who proved popular with many of his troops, took command.

=== Dalton ===
With Chattanooga safe and the Confederates retreating, General Grant sent Sherman to Mississippi, against the Confederate rail center in Meridian. Learning of this move, Johnston ordered two divisions of his army, including Cleburne's, to go to the aid of their compatriots in that state. This, in turn, led General Thomas to launch a series of probing attacks along Johnston's lines at Dalton, where he quickly learned that the new Confederate commander was someone to be reckoned with. The 33rd Alabama had proceeded as far as West Point, Alabama, when they were recalled to Dalton. Instead of returning to Tunnel Hill, they were ordered into camp along a creek east of town, where they were put to work digging trenches between that point and their old campsite on the hill. A new flag was presented to the regiment with the words: "Perryville", "Murfreesboro", "Chickamauga" and "Ringgold Gap" embroidered on it, together with an oval-shaped disc in the center containing "33 ALA." With the Federals having retreated temporarily, life at Dalton returned to normal—at least for the time being. Rifle practices were held, with targets set up at various distances up to two-hundred yards, and a "sham battle" was fought using blank cartridges.

=== Rocky Face Ridge ===
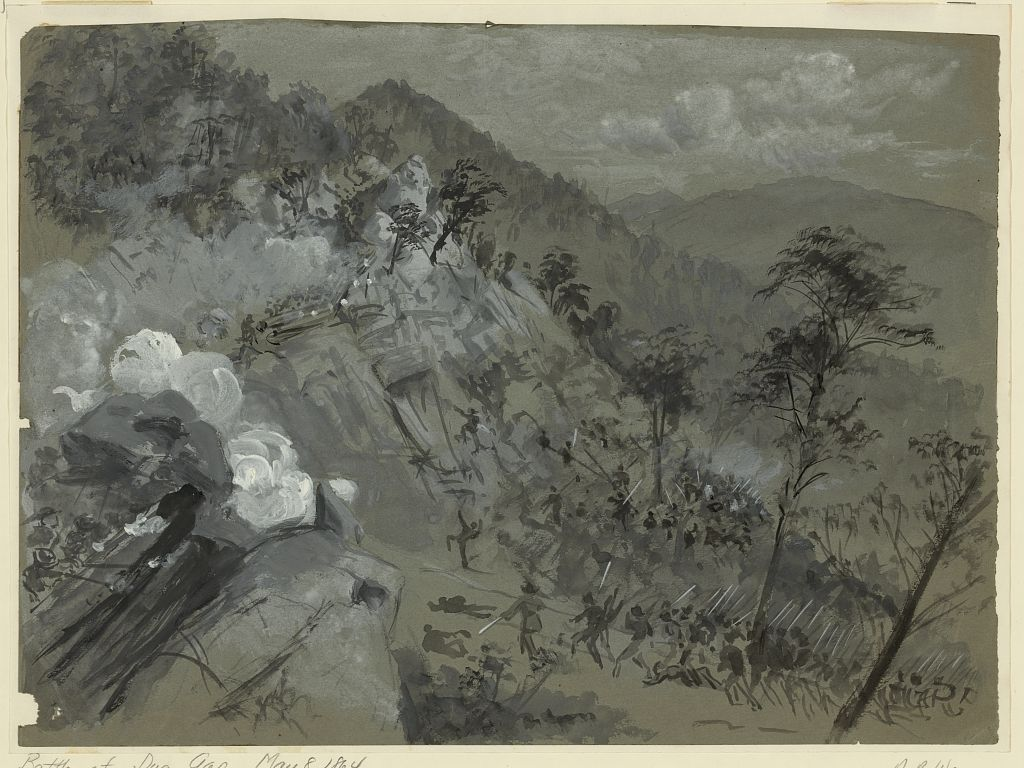
Assault on Dug Gap, part of the Battle of Rocky Face Ridge

West of Dalton, Johnston entrenched a large portion of his army along the crest of Rocky Face Ridge, a rugged mountain extending north-to-south that was pierced by passes at Buzzard Roost Gap, Dug Gap and Snake Creek Gap. Sherman had returned to Georgia after winning a victory at Meridian; here he was given command of a new Federal force known as the Military Division of the Mississippi, consisting of three armies totaling 98,500 men. Johnston, for his part, had 50,000 men at this time. When part of Sherman's army passed through undefended Snake Creek Gap toward Resaca in the Confederate rear, the 33rd Alabama and other units were sent to stop them. Ordered to assault a height near the gap, the 33rd drove the Federals from the ridge, then drove off fierce counterattacks throughout the day. Some soldiers threw rocks at their enemies, while others pried large boulders loose and rolled them down the hill onto the attacking Northerners, who finally withdrew. All these efforts went for naught, however, as Sherman ultimately flanked the "Georgia Gibraltar" and forced Johnston to withdraw toward Resaca.

=== Fire and maneuver ===
Following their retreat from Rocky Face Ridge, Johnston's Army of Tennessee engaged in a war of fight-and-get-flanked, in which Johnston first dug in at some defensible location, whereupon Sherman launched diversionary attacks on his smaller force, while flanking the Confederates elsewhere. At Resaca the 33rd Alabama was deployed with the rest of Hardee's Corps along Camp Creek, northwest of town; a series of Federal attacks on their lines were largely repulsed, until Sherman was able to flank Johnston and force him to retreat yet again. Additional battles at Adairsville and New Hope—though the latter was a Confederate victory—did nothing to change the strategic situation, as Sherman inched closer and closer to Atlanta. Moving into the Dallas area on May 26, the Federals attacked Johnston's right flank at Pickett's Mill on May 27.

=== Pickett's Mill ===
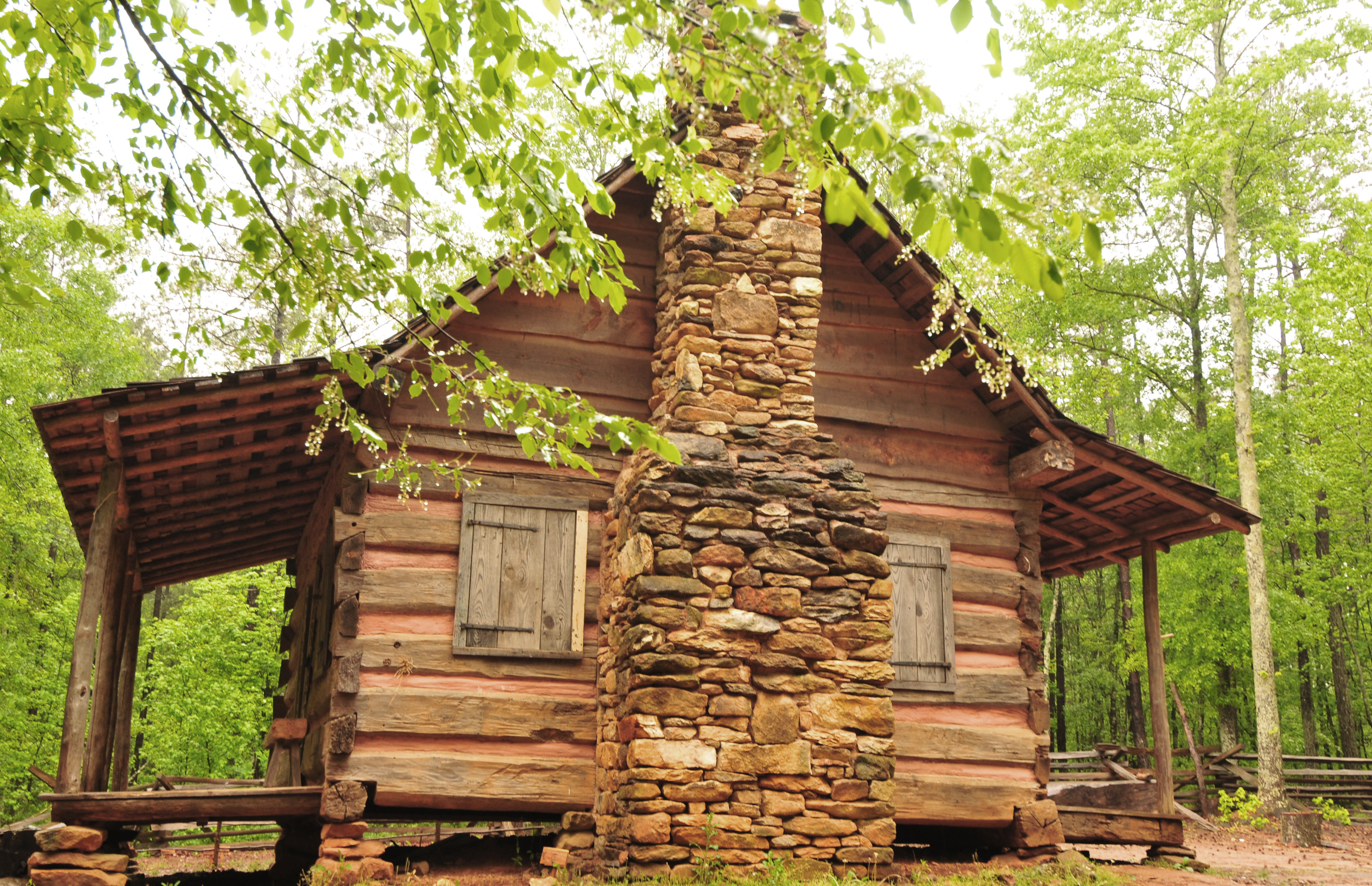
Cabin at Pickett's Mill

Determined to outflank Johnston's latest defensive position in the Allatoona Pass, Sherman moved to the southwest, intending to circle around Allatoona and cut off Johnston's retreat. But Johnston beat him to the punch, pulling back and moving toward Dallas. After a clash at New Hope Church stopped the Federal advance, both sides rushed additional troops into the area; among them was Cleyburne's Division, which deployed on the far right flank of the Southern army in densely wooded terrain with Lowrey's Brigade (including the 33rd Alabama) in reserve on its left. Opposite them were three Federal divisions belonging to Major Generals Thomas J. Wood, Jacob D. Cox and Milo S. Hascall; the overall plan was for Sherman's army to attack the Confederate right flank. For this fight, the 33rd mustered 525 men present for duty, with the number of "effectives" rated at 493.

The battle began at 7:00 am, when Cleburne sent Govan's Arkansas Brigade forward in a reconnaissance in force against the Federal left flank. Haskell's men quickly engaged the Southerners, while other Federal forces prepared to counterattack. Just as Cleburne ordered Govan's men to return to their original lines, they were attacked by two Federal divisions led by General Oliver O. Howard, who had swung out beyond the Federal left flank, seeking to turn the Confederate right. Cleburne extended his division in that direction toward a wheatfield; he also ordered his pioneers to rapidly construct trails to facilitate movement of men and supplies between his brigades. Incredibly, the Federal commander, General Howard, only ordered a single brigade to attack, even though six were available to him. This unit quickly became separated amid thick underbrush and rugged terrain, with catastrophic results. Additional Federal units were eventually sent forward, but since they got no support from other units on their line, Cleyburne was free to order Lowrey's Brigade—including the 33rd Alabama—to move to Govan's assistance. Lowrey's men arrived around 5:30, with the 33rd in the lead. Each regiment was ordered to clear the one in front of it, then turn left and come onto line.

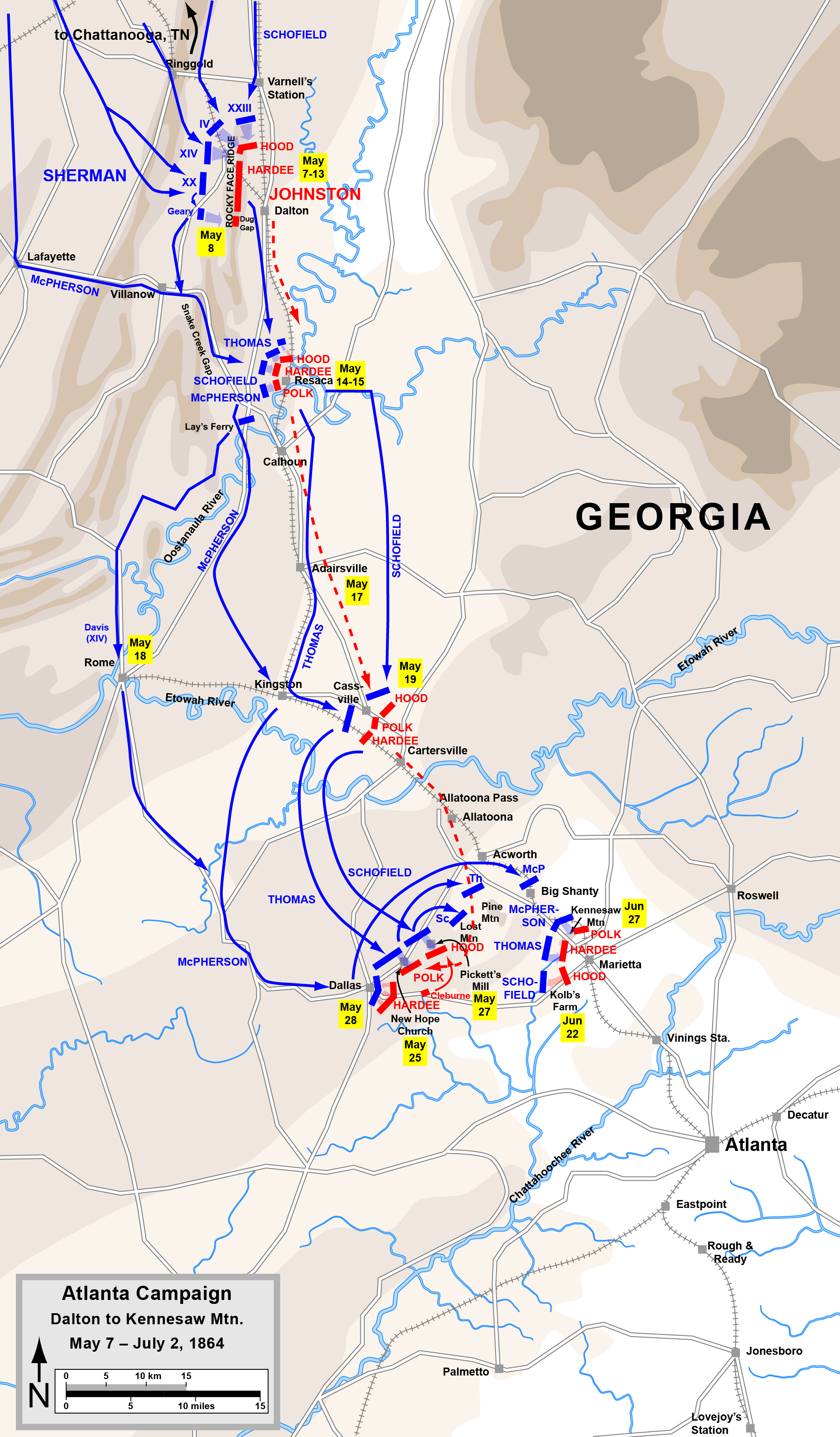
The savage waltz: Federal and Confederate movements during the Atlanta campaign, from Dalton to the Battle of Kennesaw Mountain

Confederate General John H. Kelly now came up, and ordered two Arkansas regiments to the left of the 33rd to charge the Federals; the 33rd Alabama chose to charge with them, with seven companies accompanying the Arkansas troops, and the other four veering off into a wooded hollow to the right. The Federals (belonging to the 5th Kentucky) attempted to regroup, but were hit by the 33rd's four right companies, who engaged them briefly in a cornfield before retreating to the safety of the woods, where they continued to fire on the Federals. General Lowrey arrived at this time, personally rallying the 33rd by riding back and forth among them on his horse 'Rebel' as the battle raged around him. The Federals broke and ran, then regrouped, with both sides continuing to blaze away at each other across the cornfield in the gathering twilight. Around 10:00 pm, a night charge by a nearby Confederate brigade under Hiram B. Granbury pushed the Northerners back, causing other Federal units to withdraw and giving the Confederates a victory at Pickett's Mill. Their win went for naught, though, as Sherman simply moved around the Southerners, heading for Marietta. Here he dislodged Johnston once again, as the two-to-one advantage in Federal numbers and their greater firepower proved too much for Johnston to resist.

=== Kennesaw Mountain ===
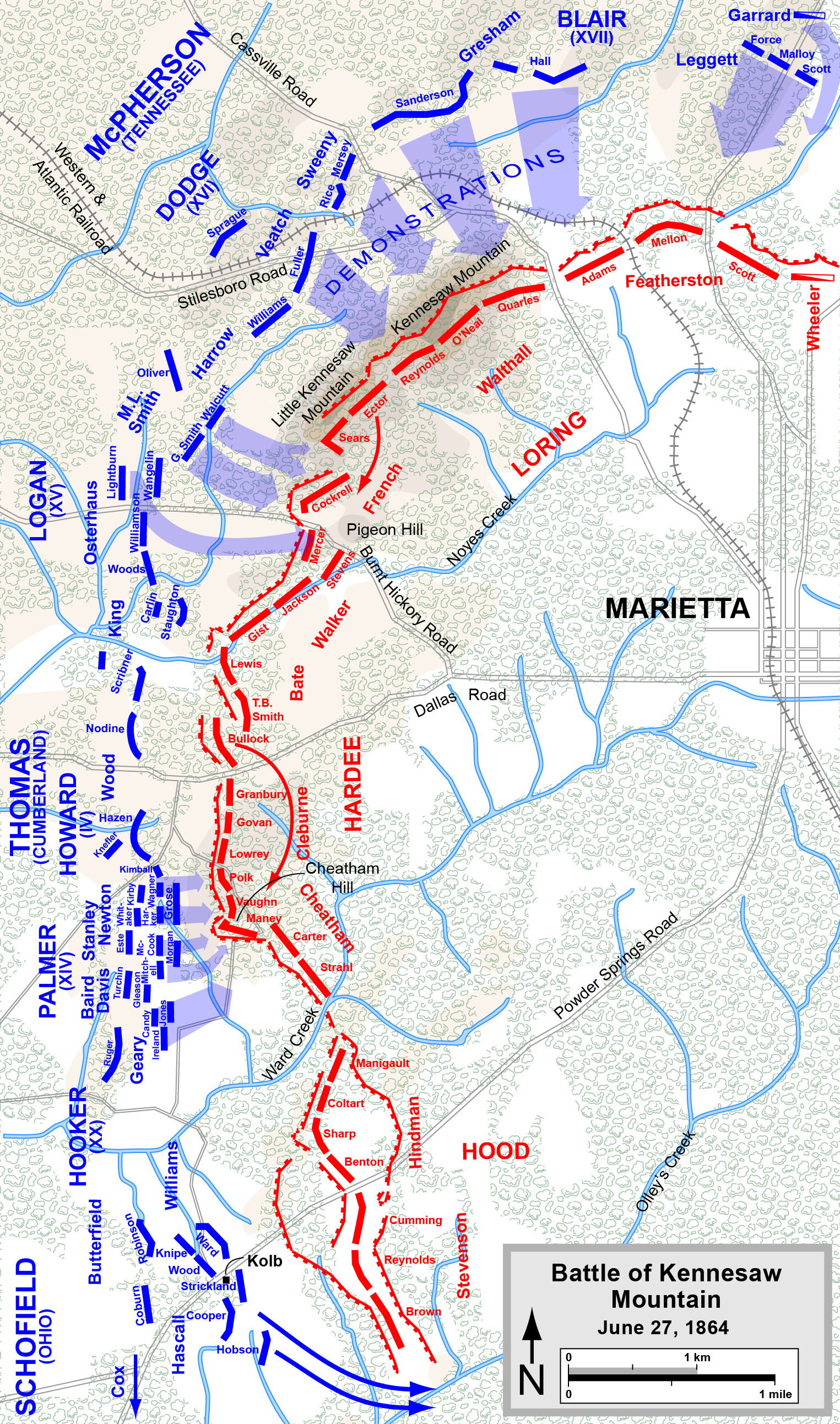
Unit positions during the Battle of Kennesaw Mountain. Cleburne's division is near the center of the Confederate line; the 33rd Alabama was part of Lowrey's brigade

By late June 1864, Sherman and Johnston were dancing a strange ballet of attack and maneuver, but the Federal commander abruptly decided to try something new. In later years Sherman indicated that his officers and opponents had become used to his propensity for flanking movements; he wanted to shake things up, he said, and demonstrate that he was capable of different tactics if a favorable opportunity arose. With rain and mud rendering movement difficult, Sherman decided to assault Johnston head-on at Kennesaw Mountain, a 1,808-foot ridge that dominated the surrounding countryside—including the railroad on which he depended for supplies. Johnston had constructed miles of trenches and fortifications on Kennesaw and nearby hills; Cleburne's Division was ordered to take a position in the center of the Confederate line.

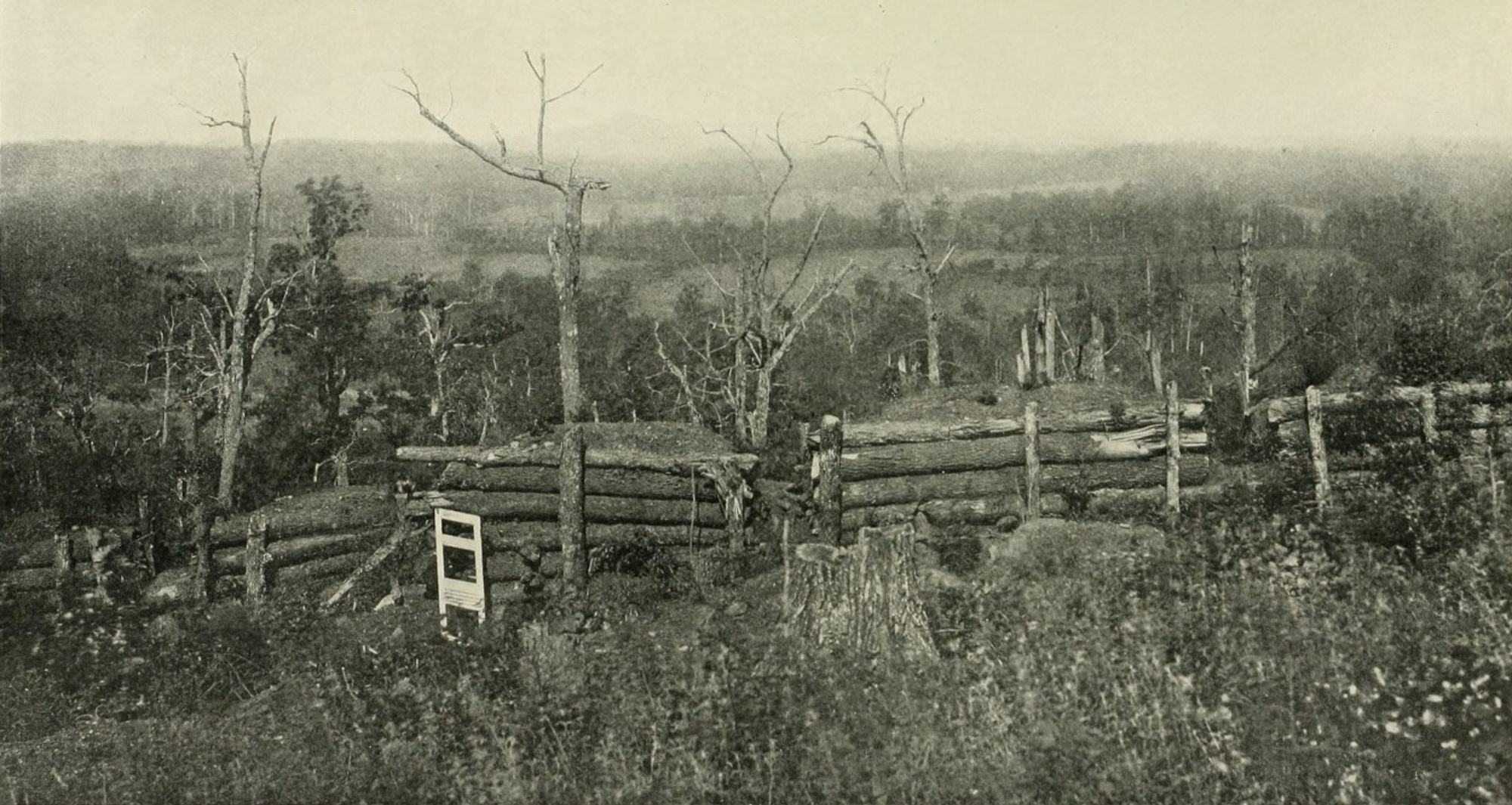
Confederate breastworks at Kennesaw Mountain

As it turned out, the main Federal attack came in Cleburne's direction. The 33rd Alabama, with the rest of Lowrey's brigade, was deployed to the right side of Cheatham Hill, facing two Federal divisions led by Jefferson C. Davis and John Newton—around 8,000 men in all. Newton attacked the sector held by the 33rd, which lay across a shallow creek situated in a valley about twenty feet deep that gave way to sloping ground, all of which was densely forested and covered with thick underbrush that made a proper pre-attack reconnaissance impossible. Felled trees and sharpened stakes driven into the ground complicated the Federal attack, which kicked off with an artillery barrage around 8:00 am on June 27. Though the Northerners managed to make some progress at first, ferocious fire from the 33rd and the rest of their compatriots drove the Federals back. Having lost 3,000 casualties to the Southerners' 1,000, Sherman finally called off the assault and left the field to his foes; a few days later he flanked Johnston once more, causing the Confederates to withdraw yet again and leading to Johnston's dismissal by Jefferson Davis on July 17.

The new commander of the Army of Tennessee was John Bell Hood, a hard-charging general who had spent part of the war serving under Longstreet in Lee's Army of Northern Virginia. Although he had demonstrated great personal bravery numerous times on the battlefield and was regarded as one of the best brigade and division commanders in the entire Confederate Army, Hood's former boss seems to have questioned his fitness for this level of command. "Hood is a gallant fighter," Robert E. Lee is reported to have said upon hearing of his former subordinate's promotion; "but I am doubtful as to the other qualities necessary." Private Matthews, upon hearing that Hood had taken command, says that he "... was known to us as a hard fighter ... all agreed that we had hard work in front of us."

== Atlanta ==
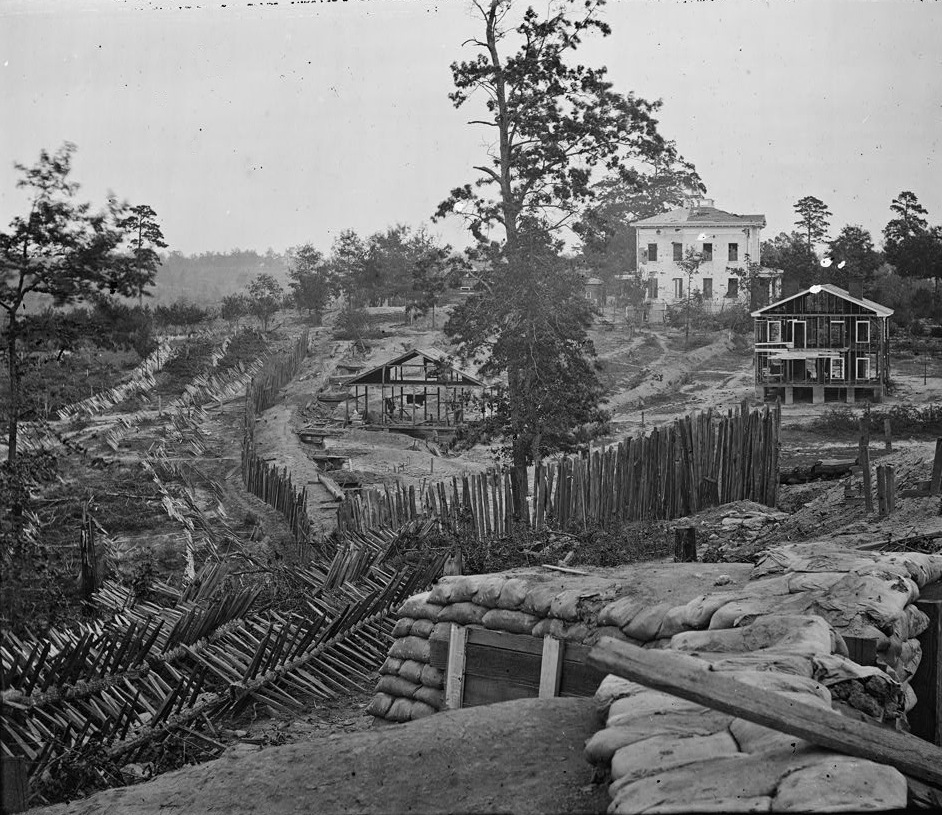
Confederate defensive works at Atlanta.

=== A death in the family ===
After taking command of the Army of Tennessee, General Hood immediately attacked Sherman in a series of spectacular but ill-advised assaults that ultimately sealed his fate at Atlanta. The first of these came at Peachtree Creek, where the 33rd Alabama was held in reserve and played no role in the contest. Hood's men were initially successful, but miscommunication and fierce Federal counterattacks finally turned the tide in Sherman's favor, and the Army of Tennessee was forced back into their fortifications around the city.

One day after Peachtree Creek the 33rd Alabama lost its regimental commander, Colonel Samuel Adams, who had been with it from its inception. Walking along the front line early that morning inspecting his men, Adams was shot by a Federal sharpshooter; he sat down by a small oak tree with both hands over his heart, and died there. Lieutenant Colonel Robert Crittenden took command of the regiment that same day.

=== Battle of Atlanta ===
Despising Sherman's overwhelming numbers and determined to renew his offensive, General Hood decided to attack James B. McPherson's Army of the Tennessee (not to be confused with Hood's own Army of Tennessee). Withdrawing from his outer line of defenses into his interior fortifications, Hood successfully enticed the Federals to move forward, then sent his cavalry to raid Sherman's exposed supply lines while ordering General Hardee's corps—including Cleyburne's Division and the 33rd Alabama—to hit the Union left flank. The 33rd engaged around noon on July 22, charging into a wooded area and capturing "prisoners, guns and accouterments, knapsacks and blankets, files and an ambulance." The regiment stopped at a nearby creek to fill their canteens, which gave the Federal defenders time to bring up artillery and reinforcements; these blasted the 33rd as they emerged from the creek valley and charged through a field and up a hill toward their lines.

Private Matthews describes the action in these words:

We charged up a hill in a field to within some thirty yards of a line in a ditch that we could not carry, but lay down and while lying there firing one man of the regiment wandered about us with a Minie ball in his head, and a knot of brains as large as a hen egg over the hole; and occasionally we heard another ball strike him, which he did not appear to mind, and we not caring, thinking the sooner he died the better. Then we had orders to get out a few at a time; soon after I saw a line of Federals through the bushes in the branch [creek] ... shouting and calling us to halt, and capturing part of the regiment ... I was not obeying Yankees when I had good legs, and by bearing obliquely up the branch, then into the woods where I dropped behind a pole, then a shell struck one end of it knocking over one man, when I got up and further to the rear. Now we reformed the regiment near where we had captured the line of Federal temporary works earlier in the fight, and with our bayonets soon had quite a ditch to get into ...

When one Lieutenant in the regiment realized that the captured Federal ambulance contained a 10-gallon keg of whiskey, he immediately sent soldiers back to guard it until it could be safely removed. Once the 33rd had finished fortifying its position, the whiskey was doled out at the rate of one gill per man, measured in a tin cup.

=== Digging in ===
Robert Crittenden, the second commander of the 33rd Alabama

During the Siege of Atlanta, members of the 33rd quickly learned that they were safer below ground than above it. At first they slept on the ground just behind their trenches, but with snipers and artillery wreaking havoc among them at night, they decided to stay in their ditch at all times. Perpendicular trenches were dug to grant access to their rear areas, while lights of any kind were banned at night. With no means of washing their clothes, the men suffered from insect infestations; their agony was compounded by a nearby Federal gun that managed to draw a transverse bead on their trench, doing considerable damage until Confederate counter-battery fire finally silenced it. The regiment was gradually moved to the left each day, digging new ditches in the red clay soil with bayonets, spades or picks, but never engaging the enemy.

=== Jonesborough ===
On the night of August 30, the 33rd Alabama was ordered to move to its left, with its troops collapsing from exhaustion every time the regiment stopped to rest. Arriving in the Atlanta suburb of Jonesborough on the morning of the 31st, the 33rd was fed into the line and permitted to rest for a time. In the afternoon they and the rest of Lowery's Brigade were ordered to charge the Federal works, where they managed to capture two steel cannon. They were quickly ambushed by dismounted Union cavalry commanded by Hugh Judson Kilpatrick and armed with Spencer Repeating Rifles; the brigade managed to drive them back, but were soon stopped by other Federal troops and returned to their lines.

On September 1, Cleburne's division was attacked by elements of two Federal corps. Private Matthews reports that the Federals nearly broke their line, only to be driven back with the help of reinforcements from General Cheatham's division. These men were later withdrawn to bolster up another section of the line, however, leaving the 33rd to defend its sector with a single line of troops and no reserve. Further Federal attacks did not materialize; the Northerners were content to snipe at the 33rd throughout the rest of the day while their compatriots smashed through the Confederate line further north, leading the remnants to withdraw around nine that evening. Members of the regiment could see fires and hear explosions on the horizon, as Hood destroyed all of his supplies in Atlanta and evacuated the city. The Alabamians linked up with an ambulance carrying their wounded and followed it to Lovejoy, Georgia, where they repulsed a Federal attack on the railroad there and got the first real night's sleep they had enjoyed in 122 days.

== Back to Tennessee ==
The Franklin-Nashville Campaign

=== Moving on ===
After his defeat at Atlanta, General Hood regrouped his army at Lovejoy's Station, following which he moved to Palmetto, Georgia. Here the Army of Tennessee was reviewed by Confederate President Jefferson Davis, who had come to speak with Hood about his next move. Even after the debacle at Atlanta, Hood still retained a formidable force of 39,000 men, and though Davis expressed disappointment in the way he had fought in Georgia and spoke of relieving him from command, he ultimately decided that Hood would keep his job. Davis did order Lieutenant General Hardee, the 33rd's longtime corps commander, to a new assignment, replacing him with Frank Cheatham. Hoping to draw Sherman away from Atlanta, Hood and Davis decided that the Army of Tennessee would move north toward Chattanooga, seeking to damage Federal supply lines and force Sherman to do battle on terrain favorable to the Confederates.

By October 3, 1864, the Army of Tennessee had reached Kennesaw, site of their battle earlier that summer. So far, Hood's plan seemed to be working: Sherman had sent General Thomas back to Nashville to organize troops in that state, while sending another division under Brigadier General James Morgan to Chattanooga. Federal cavalry assigned to follow Hood's army lost track of him periodically and were only able to give an approximate picture of his movements. The 33rd camped near Lost Mountain on the third, on an old battlefield where the Confederate dead had been buried in shallow graves or simply left to rot. Private Matthews reported seeing decaying hands, feet or limbs protruding from the dirt, where dogs and other scavengers had dug up the graves to get at the rotting food in their haversacks. After spending a day reburying the exposed corpses, the 33rd moved on to Dallas and then to Cedartown, where one man in the regiment was killed in a freak accident after lightning struck a stack of rifles he was hanging his haversack on. Turning northeast toward Dalton, the regiment tore up railroad tracks along Sherman's supply line by heating the rails atop a fire made of railroad ties, then bending them. Men from the regiment were beginning to recognize old battlefields and campsites; on one night near Lafayette, the regiment even camped in the exact spot it had occupied just before the Battle of Chickamauga, the year before. With rations severely limited in the picked-over countryside, sorghum became even more popular than ever: soldiers would leave the marching column to gather armfuls of sugar cane for themselves and their friends or steal it from nearby farms at night; while their officers did not publicly sanction this behavior, they were known to eat their share after their troops had bivouacked for the evening.

=== Home, sweet home ===
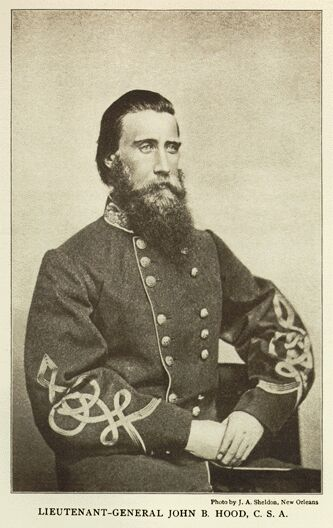
General John Bell Hood, who commanded the Army of Tennessee at Atlanta and during the Franklin-Nashville Campaign

Bypassing a strong Federal garrison at Resaca, Hood turned southwest and headed into Alabama, toward George Thomas' army headquartered in Nashville, Tennessee. For the first time in the war the 33rd would be operating inside its native state, if only briefly. Sherman had turned back toward Atlanta, from whence he would begin his famed March to the Sea, after sending additional troops to help Thomas in Tennessee. Hood's plan was to drive north into Tennessee, defeat Thomas there, then move into Kentucky and thence east into Virginia, where Robert E. Lee was under siege at Petersburg. Seeking to link up with reinforcements under famed cavalry General Nathan Bedford Forrest, Hood moved west through northern Alabama to Florence, then north into Tennessee.

=== Spring Hill ===
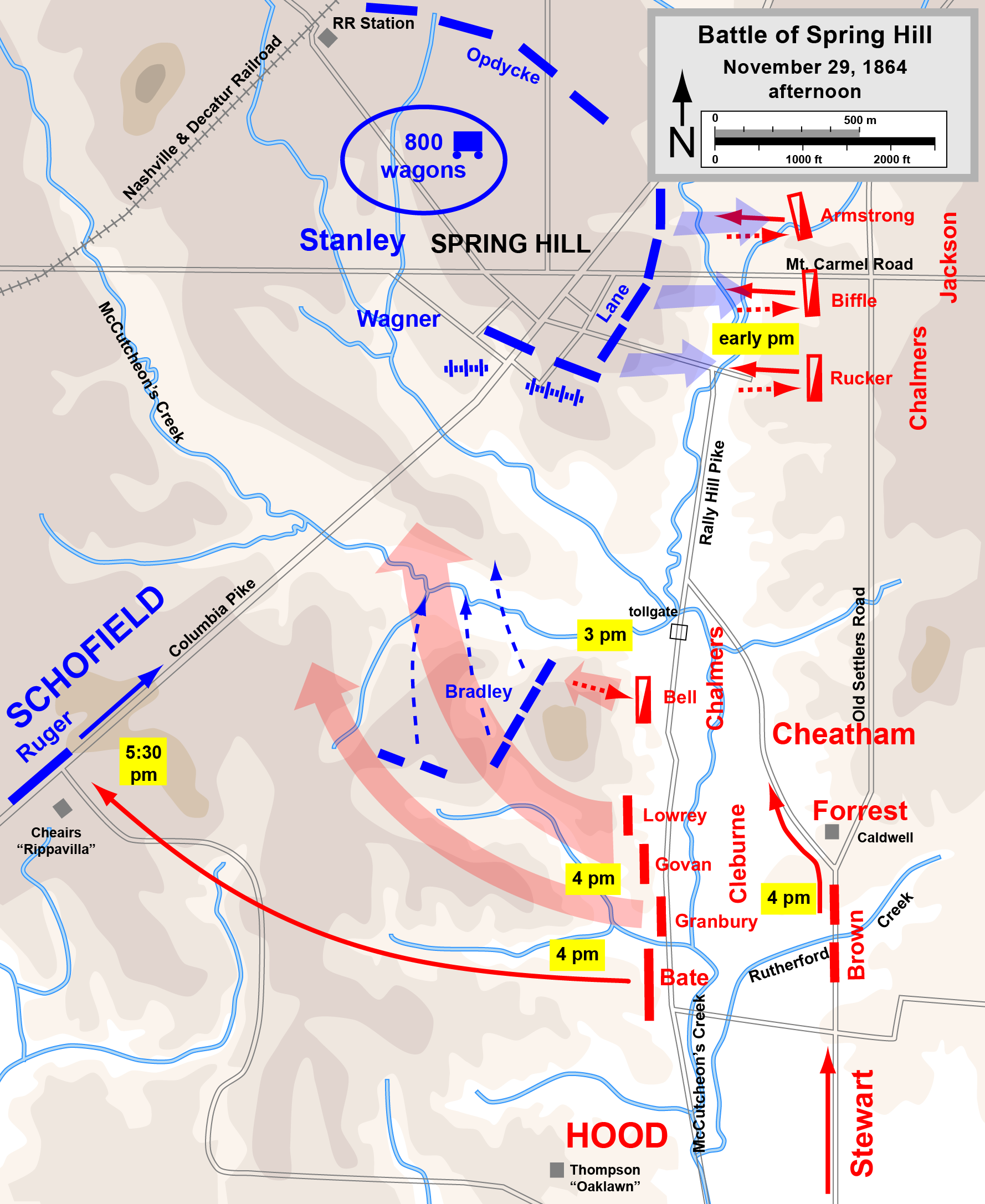
The Battle of Spring Hill. The 33rd Alabama was in Lowrey's Brigade

At first, Generals Thomas and Sherman did not believe that Hood would actually invade Tennessee, with a Federal army about to burn its way through Georgia. However, as it became clear that this was Hood's destination, Thomas began to take action. Ordering Major General John M. Schofield to move to Columbia on the Duck River, Thomas hoped to intercept Hood before he could seize this important crossing. Hood split his army into three columns: the 33rd and the rest of Cheatham's Corps marched in the westernmost one through seventy miles of freezing rain, sleet and bitterly cold winds toward Mt. Pleasant, where the three columns reunited and continued in the direction of Columbia. Effectively screened by Forrest's cavalry, the Confederates reached Columbia just after the Federals had arrived and started to entrench. Bold maneuvers on the part of General Forrest, combined with artillery fire and effective demonstrations by the rest of Hood's army allowed them to cross the Duck River east of town, moving north toward Spring Hill—for once, the Army of Tennessee had been able to use the same tactic Sherman had used so well against them in Georgia. Amazingly, neither side reported any casualties in this encounter, which had consisted almost entirely of feints and shelling.

Having moved around Schofield's rapidly retreating force, Hood hoped to catch and destroy it near Spring Hill, to the north of Columbia. The Army of Tennessee moved rapidly along back-country roads and through fields and woods, with the men required to keep in ranks at all times while stragglers were dealt with severely. Forrest's cavalry arrived at the crossroads around 11:30 am on November 29; there they ran into elements of the Federal IV Corps, which had rushed ahead to hold the crossing until the rest of Schofield's army could arrive. Cleburne's division arrived in the afternoon just as Forrest's men were about to exhaust their ammunition. They immediately deployed for an attack, with the 33rd Alabama crossing a small stream and advancing around 4:00 pm with the rest of their division toward a Federal brigade under the command of Colonel Luther Prentice Bradley. Cleburne staggered his brigades in echelon formation, with Lowrey's Brigade on the far right. Lowrey's men engaged first, with the 33rd advancing "across a slope and across a field, [driving] the Federals from behind some rail defenses, then on up and around ... a horse lot rail fence, barn and dwelling where we were making a stand ... we followed them down a slope, where we halted and reformed the line." With Cleburne personally leading Govan's Arkansas Brigade in support, his division soon routed the Federals and advanced toward Schofield's line of march on the Columbia Pike. Here they were stopped cold by Federal artillery; as darkness fell, the entire Confederate attack ground to a halt. Although Hood planned to attack Schofield's approaching army in the morning, the Federals slipped by him in the darkness while he and his men slept, moving on to the nearby town of Franklin. Here the 33rd and the rest of Hood's army were about to experience their worst day of the war.

=== Franklin ===
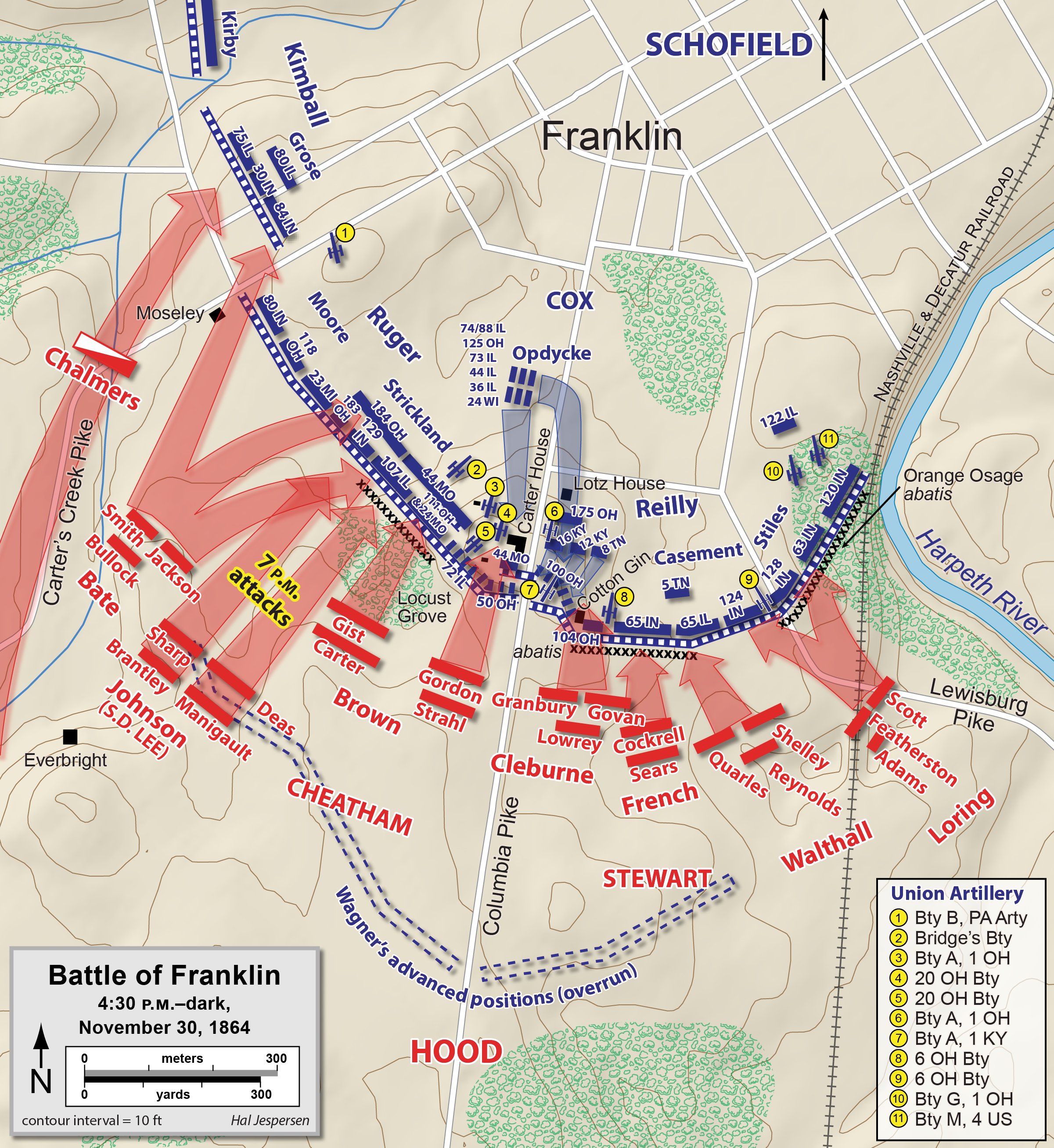
Cleburne's assault at the Battle of Franklin. The 33rd Alabama attacked with the rest of Lowrey's Brigade on the right flank of Cleburne's division, which attacked just to the right of the Columbia Pike at the center of the image

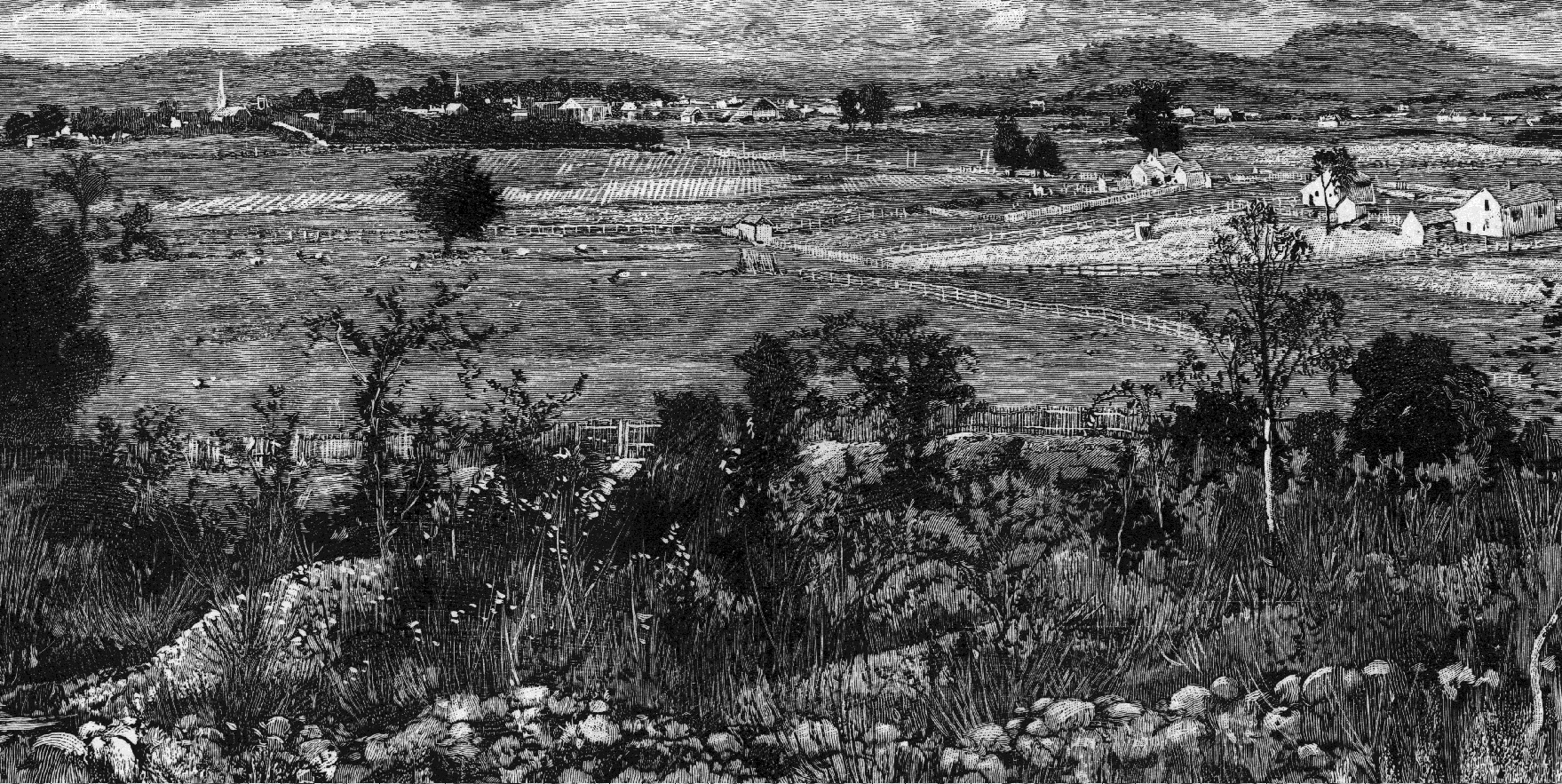
The battlefield at Franklin, from an etching made about 20 years after the war. The Federals were entrenched on the far side of this field

On November 30, 1864, General Hood awoke to learn that Schofield's army had slipped by him during the night and was now safely entrenched in Franklin, 12 miles (19 km) to the north. Enraged at this unexpected development, Hood angrily blamed his subordinates—especially Cheatham—for letting the Federals escape. Determined to stop Schofield from uniting with Thomas' main force at Nashville, Hood resolved to attack him head-on at Franklin, even though the Federals were now behind formidable fortifications (built for a previous battle fought there the year before). These included breastworks six-to-eight feet high fronted by four-foot wide ditches, and thorny obstructions using branches from Osage Orange trees in the area. Although Hood had roughly 39,000 men, only 27,000 would make the attack; this placed them at even odds with the Federals, who had the same number of men.

Hood's army began to arrive at Franklin around 1:00 pm, with the infantry far outpacing their artillery and other support personnel. Rather than wait for his guns to come up, Hood ordered an immediate assault, as the sun would be setting in just over three and a half hours and he did not want Schofield to get away again. Cleburne, Cheatham and Forrest all protested Hood's plan, but their commander remained determined. So, bereft of artillery support, Cleburne now prepared to lead his division across two miles of open field toward the very center of the Federal line. When General Govan said that few of them would live to see the end of this day, a visibly depressed Cleburne replied: "Well Govan, if we are to die, let us die like men."

During the attack at Franklin, Lowrey's Brigade formed a second line in Cleburne's division, behind the brigades of Govan and Granbury. Moving through savage cannon fire toward the Carter House Cotton Gin across the field, the 33rd halted briefly with their sister regiments to fix bayonets, having been ordered not to shoot until they reached the Federal trenches. Then screaming their famous "rebel yell" they charged headlong into the breastworks, held in this sector by the 100th and 104th Ohio Infantry^{i} regiments, the 6th Ohio Battery and Battery A of the 1st Kentucky. Behind them stood the 16th Kentucky, the 12th Kentucky, the 8th Tennessee (Union) Infantry, and Battery "A" of the 1st Ohio Battery. Behind them was the 175th Ohio Infantry.

Two privates of the 33rd left accounts of what happened next. Private Matthews records:

The ground was open, shells exploding within about one thousand yards of their works, and after they had opened [up] on us with small arms, the command 'double quick' was given. Then we went on a run and a continuous yell to their works ... I was wounded in getting through the abatis; by the time we got to their works our ranks were so thinned that our men could not get over. Many were shot in the attempt ...

Private Andrew Jackson Batchelor, of Company K, gives this account:

Our first line captured the first line of the Federal works, a 'temporary' ... In our front, I think they [the first and second lines of the Federal defensive works] were about one hundred yards apart. Our orders were not to stop at the first work, but to cross over the second line. A few of us obeyed orders. How many poor fellows never reached the second line ... I could not see their works until within a few yards of them, the smoke was so dense. When I reached the ditch, it was filled with dead and wounded Confederates. I walked over on dead men. There were five or six of us near our colors, but all fell in the ditch but myself. Our colors were just over the works. I ran up on the works at the corner of the old gin house. I threw my gun down on the works at the corner of the gin house. Just then I was jerked over the works.

Savage fighting ensued as Cleburne's Confederates briefly penetrated the inner Federal defenses near the cotton gin; Federal soldiers wrote of desperately trying to stop the onrushing tide not just with rifles, but with axes, hatchets, and "anything that came into hand." Cleburne was killed fifty yards from the breastworks, after having two horses shot out from under him and running the rest of the way on foot, sword in one hand and his kepi hat in the other.

In his autobiography, written two years after the war, General Lowrey recalled his brigade's performance at Franklin:

In the engagement at Franklin, my brigade was in the second line (on the east side of the Columbia Pike, behind Govan's and Granbury's brigades, the brigade's left extending to the pike). The enemy was driven from his first line, but checked our forces at his second line. I brought up my brigade (probably about 4:30 or 4:45 PM), and under the most destructive fire I ever witnessed, I threw my brigade into the outside ditch of his massive works, and my men fought the enemy across the parapet. Up to this time about half my men had fallen, and the balance could not scale the works. It would have been certain death or capture to every one of them. I went on my horse to within 30 feet of the works, where I had my horse wounded, and when I saw nothing else could be done I went to the rear, and began the work of gathering up the fragments of (Cleburne's) division.

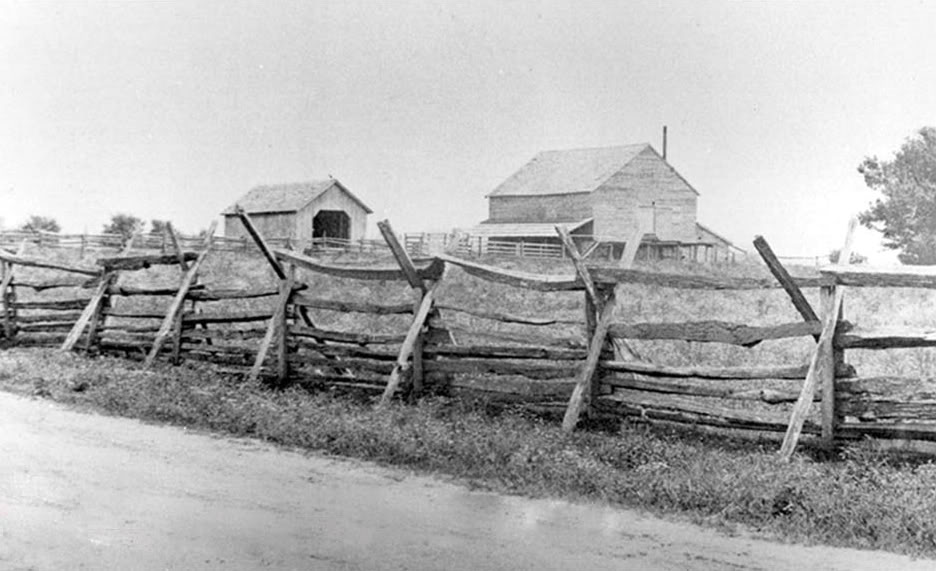
The Carter House cotton gin at Franklin

The final charge of Patrick Cleburne and his men at Franklin has been featured in Civil War art. Some examples of this include portraits by Dale Gallon, Don Troiani and Mort Kunstler. Of his one-time subordinate,^{j} the Irish doctor's son who had risen from a British corporal to a Southern Major General and then to immortality, General Hardee observed: "Where this division defended, no odds broke its line; where it attacked, no numbers resisted its onslaught, save only once; and there is the grave of Cleburne."

By the time the smoke cleared at Franklin, the Army of Tennessee had suffered a cataclysmic defeat: it had lost 6,252 men in just a couple of hours, including six dead generals, six wounded, and one captured. In addition, 55 of Hood's regimental commanders became casualties—an appalling loss of mid-level commanders in an army that had lost many, already. The 33rd Alabama lost two-thirds of its original 285 men; the remnant could no longer function as an independent fighting unit, so they were consolidated with survivors from the 16th and 45th Alabama regiments in a single formation, though the regimental designations were not rescinded.

=== Nashville ===
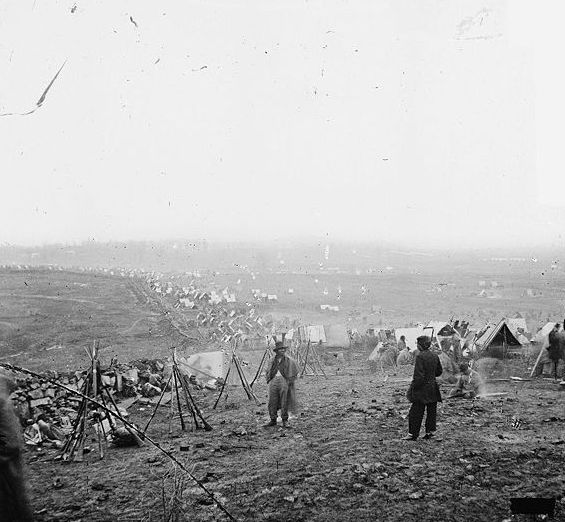
Federal soldiers on the front line at Nashville on December 16, on the morning of the battle's second day

The Battle of Nashville, death knell for the Army of Tennessee

Incredibly, even after his debacle at Franklin, General Hood insisted on continuing his march toward Nashville. He seems to have been motivated more by a desire to prevent his army from disintegrating through desertion than by any thought that he stood a chance of victory, now that Thomas had 71,842 men to his 23,053. Federal engineers had been fortifying the city for over two years; in addition to seven miles of trench lines and fortifications, a powerful fleet of Union ironclads on the Cumberland River offered additional firepower while protecting the city from amphibious assault. Hood arrived at Nashville on December 2 and set to work constructing his own line of fortifications, hoping that Thomas would emerge from behind his own breastworks and attack him under unfavorable conditions. Cheatham's corps, including the badly depleted 33rd Alabama, manned the right section of Hood's line. Lowrey's Brigade held the extreme right flank, which ended at a deep railroad cut belonging to the Nashville and Chattanooga Railroad. A bitter ice storm began on December 8 and subzero temperatures persisted through December 12, further complicating the Southerners' misery.

Hood did not have to wait long for his nemesis to appear: once the weather abated, Thomas emerged from his fortifications on December 15, and hit Hood's army. The 33rd Alabama was engaged with the rest of Lowrey's Brigade by a brigade of United States Colored Troops and another one composed of men described by their own commander as "new conscripts, convalescents and bounty jumpers." Intended to divert Hood's attention from the main attack intended for his left flank, this assault was beaten back, though the Federals continued to fire at the Alabamians and their friends over the course of the day. The Federal attack smashed Hood's left, and he was compelled to retreat to a new and more compact line, some distance to the rear of his original line.

The following morning found the 33rd Alabama with the rest of Cheatham's Division on the Confederate left flank, near a road called the Granny White Pike. This section of the front was hit late in the day by a three-brigade attack led by Federal Brigadier General John McArthur, which smashed through the poorly placed defenses and rolled up Hood's line from west to east as additional Union forces joined the assault. Hood's army rapidly disintegrated, with its shattered remnants fleeing down the Granny White Pike and nearby roads to Columbia, not ultimately stopping until they reached Tupelo, Mississippi, 220 miles away.

Already decimated by its fruitless assault at Franklin, the once-proud Army of Tennessee was all but obliterated at Nashville. Having taken 39,000 men with him into Tennessee the month before, Hood came out with 18,742. His own career irreparably ruined, Hood resigned his position and would not receive another command for the duration of the war. Private Matthews reports that on the day after the battle, "we that could stand were given two or three pounds of flour and a pound or two of beef, and told to get South."

== The Carolina Campaign ==
=== Picking up the pieces ===
Following the disaster at Nashville, the few remaining members of the 33rd Alabama withdrew with the rest of their shattered army, first to Columbia, then further south to Decatur, Alabama, and thence to Tupelo. Morale had sunk to an all-time low, with many of the survivors believing they had been "unfortunately handled." In January 1865 the regiment drew shoes and marched from Tupelo to West Point, Mississippi, where they boarded a train that took them first to Meridian and then to Demopolis, Alabama. Here they were forced to sleep in the mud along the tracks, because they could find no branches to make ridge-poles for their tents. On the way to Selma the following day, their train derailed in an eerie repeat of the episode in late 1862; several men from Companies B and G were sitting on top of the cars, and were injured when their boxcars left the tracks. The men dusted themselves off and resumed their journey, arriving in Selma the next day, where they boarded steamboats and proceeded to Montgomery.

=== Carolina ===
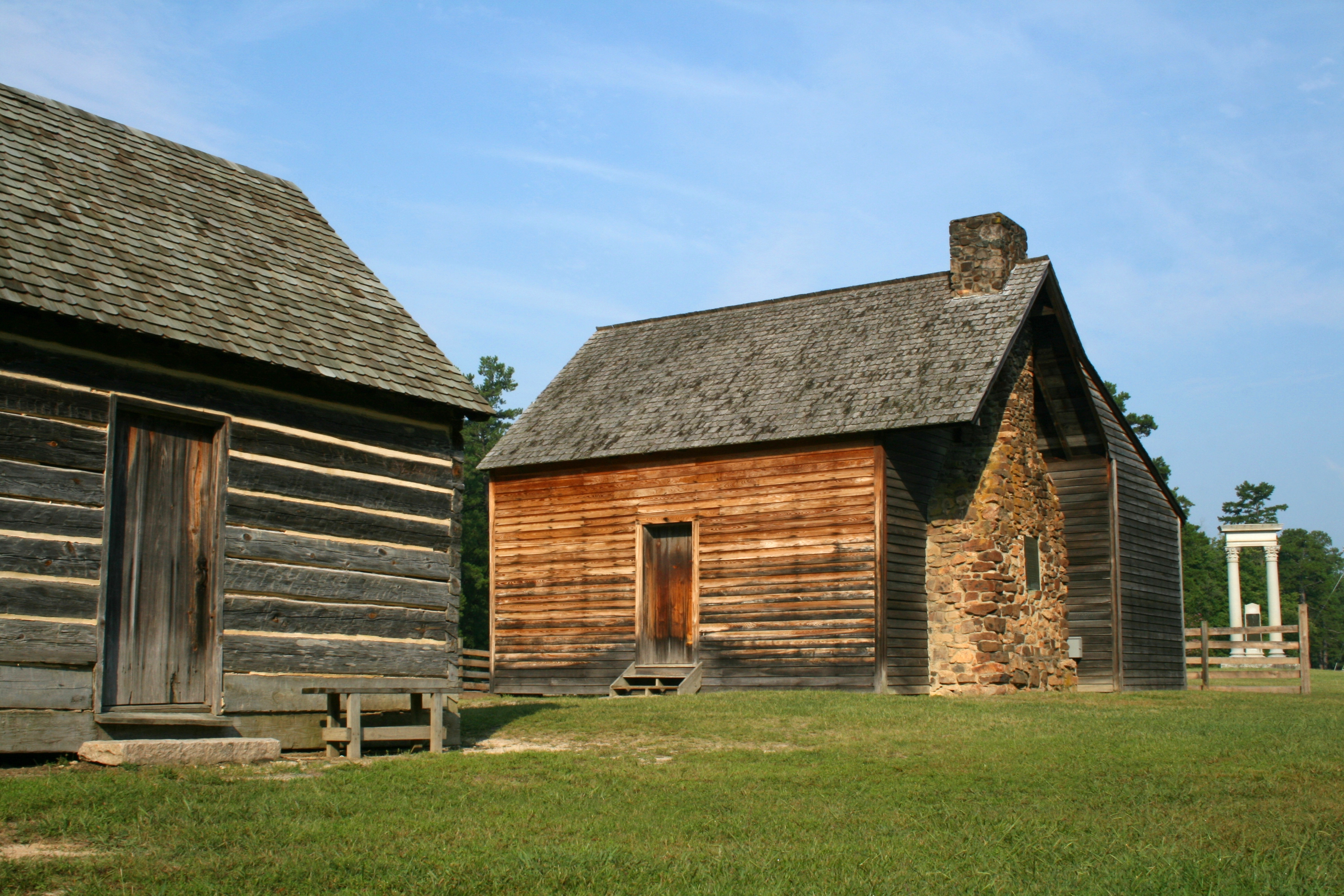
Bennett Place, where the 33rd Alabama and the rest of Johnston's Army surrendered to General William T. Sherman, effectively ending the U.S. Civil War

Following a 10-day furlough in February 1865, the last remnant of the 33rd Alabama—many bereft of weapons or basic equipment—boarded trains to Augusta, Georgia, where they were brigaded and ordered to march to Rock Hill, South Carolina, where they boarded another train for Smithfield, North Carolina. Here their final assignment awaited them, in Joseph Johnston's newly formed Army of the South. The regiment participated at the three-day Battle of Bentonville on March 19–21, 1865, not arriving on the battlefield until the final day when the contest was already lost. On April 8 they, along with the 16th and 45th Alabama, were consolidated with the 17th Alabama; this remnant was surrendered to General Sherman with the rest of Johnston's army at Bennett Place near Durham eighteen days later. Sherman issued ten day's rations to his former enemies, then released them to return to their homes.

On his way back to Alabama, Private Matthews reported that Federal soldiers assigned to guard the trains took pleasure in shooting at livestock from the moving boxcars. On one occasion near Dawson, Georgia, one such Yankee saw a woman plowing with an ox about a quarter-mile from the train; he shot it dead, and Matthews recorded that "had we men aboard protested, they would have shot us."

The regimental survivors returned to their homes in southeastern Alabama, where some resumed their lives while others eventually relocated to different counties and states.

== Regimental commanders, weapons and equipment ==
=== Commander and other field officers ===
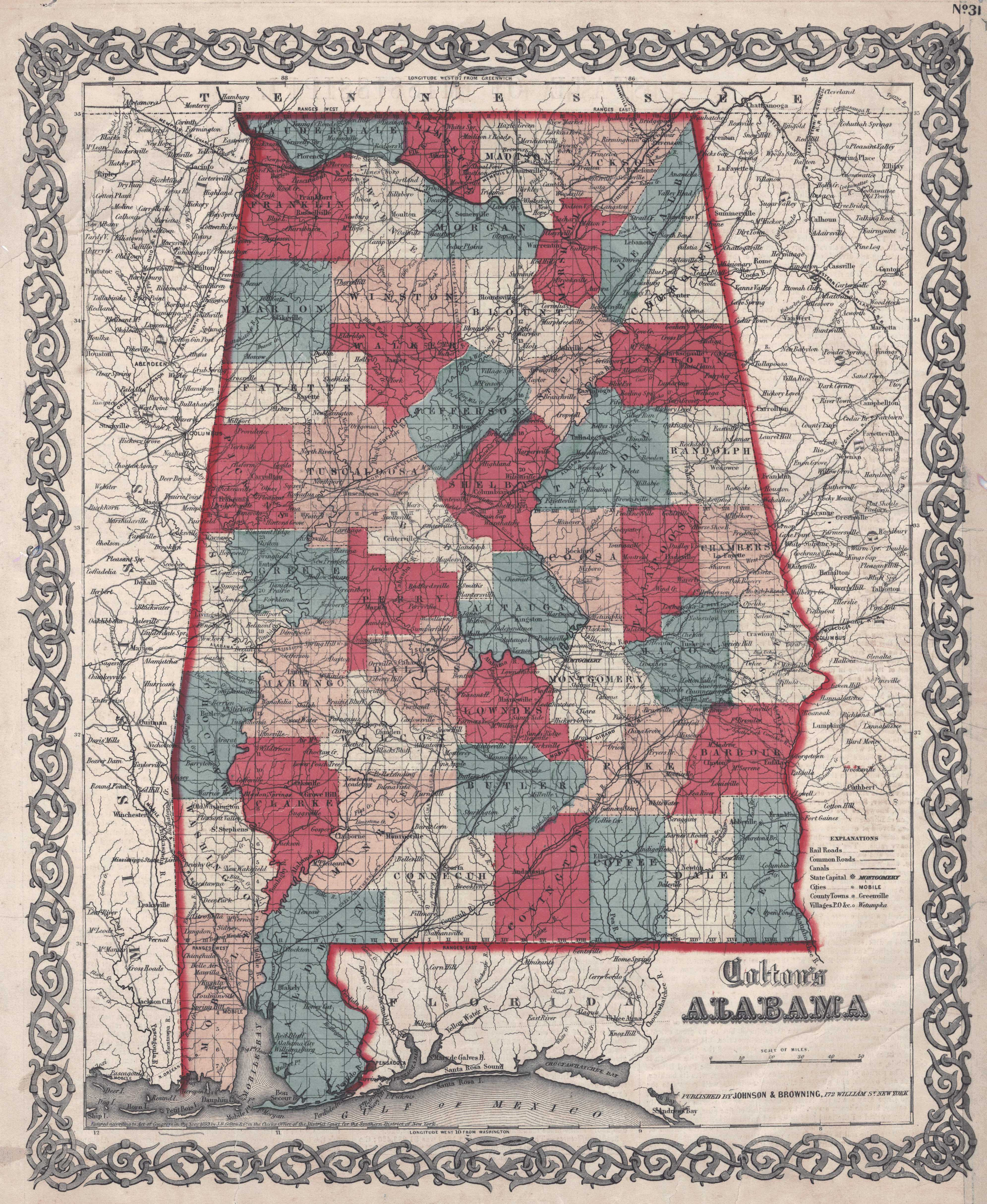
1859 map of Alabama. The 33rd Alabama was recruited mostly from counties in the southeastern portion of the state

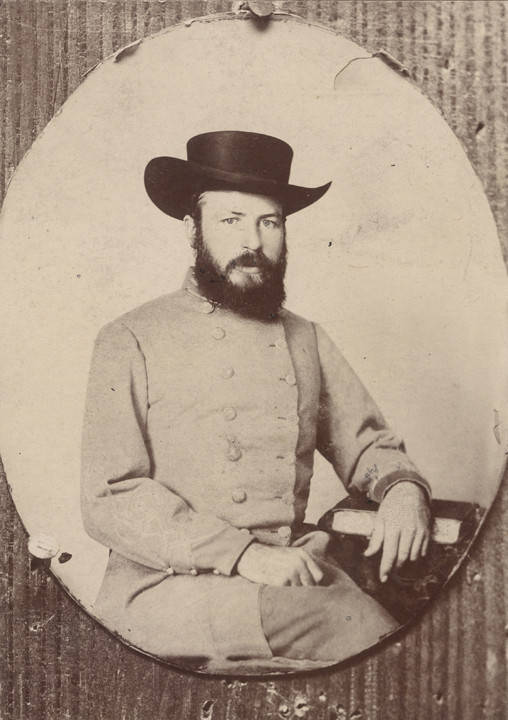
Colonel Samuel Adams, first commander of the 33rd Alabama

The first regimental commander of the 33rd Alabama was Colonel Samuel Adams, born in 1829 in Abbeville, South Carolina. Educated at South Carolina College (from which he graduated in 1850), he relocated to Greenville, Alabama, where he served as principal of an academy there. He spent his spare time reading Law, and was admitted to the Alabama Bar in 1852. He married Dora Herbert, and soon embarked on a political career, being elected to the U.S House of Representatives from the Whig Party in 1857 and 1859.

Adams initially enlisted in the 9th Alabama Infantry in 1861, where he was elected first lieutenant of his company and served in the Confederate Army of the Potomac, the antecedent of Robert E. Lee's Army of Northern Virginia. Released in February 1862 to recruit men in his home state, he was chosen to command the newly formed 33rd Alabama. Adams was wounded in the foot at Perryville while leading a brigade; after returning to regimental command in 1864, he was awaiting a recommended promotion to brigadier general when he was mortally wounded by a Federal sharpshooter at the Battle of Atlanta.

After Perryville Adams was replaced by Colonel Robert Crittenden of Coffee County, who was captured at Nashville. Other regimental officers included: Isaac Corn, James Dunklin, John Crosby, A.N. Moore and Willis Milner. Adams and Moore were killed in battle, Crosby died of natural causes, Dunklin was wounded, and Crittenden was captured.

=== Regimental flag ===
The first regimental flag of the 33rd Alabama was described as: "blue, with a white crescent moon near the center, trimmed with a two-inch white border;" later versions incorporated the regimental number and battles in which it had participated. While in service under General Cleburne, the 33rd did not carry the Confederate battle flag as most units did; instead, Cleburne—who openly encouraged competitiveness among the units in his division—directed them to carry their own distinctive banners, which they were instructed to "make respected" not merely by their enemies, but by their compatriots as well. Cleburne's division especially nursed a rivalry with the division led by Major General Benjamin F. Cheatham; the two often fought side by side, and while good-natured competitiveness ran high between them, so did mutual camaraderie and trust.

The colors of the 33rd Alabama were captured at Franklin by Captain J.H. Brown of Company D, 12th Kentucky Infantry Regiment. Unlike other captured Confederate flags, which were displayed for decades in Northern public places or elsewhere, the flag of the 33rd vanished soon after being given the designation "Flag No. 245" in 1865. In 1940, it was rediscovered by accident at an estate sale in Melrose, Massachusetts. Citizens of the town joined with local public figures to purchase the flag, which was presented to the Governor of Alabama during a special ceremony in September of that year. The flag was given to the state archives, where it has been treated to aid in its preservation, and is now on exhibit in their museum.

A replacement for the captured regimental standard was made soon after its loss at Franklin; this was described as a "Hardee-pattern battle flag with no numbers, words or battle honors." This banner was kept by Captain Needham Hughes of Co. I, who was acting as the 33rd's brigade commander at the close of the war. He slipped out of the regiment's camp just after the capitulation and wrapped the flag around himself, under his uniform, to prevent it from being turned over to the Union authorities as a trophy of war. Hughes took it home, and it has been in his family ever since.

=== Uniforms ===
W.E. Matthews,^{a} a Private in the 33rd Alabama's Company B, left an extremely detailed description of the equipment issued to his regiment by Confederate and state authorities. According to him, their initial clothing issue was as follows:

At Ft. McRee we drew grey woolen jeans uniforms: vis. a round jacket coat that extended down to about the hip joint, pants and caps, though most of us used the caps very little, preferring the hats we had. Later the gray uniform, being less conspicuous, gave us an advantage at sighting at a blue uniform or a line of them ... We also drew leather cartridge boxes about seven inches square and about two and a half inches thick, suspended by a leather [strap] about two inches wide, which hung over the left shoulder, the box hanging from our right side and attached to our leather belt which fastened around the waist by a two or three inch brass or copper plate, with a catch on the underside and 'CSA' on the front side ... Inside the leather box were tins containing forty rounds of cartridges. A leather cap box attached to the belt just in front of the cartridge box, [and] a bayonet in a scabbard hung on the belt at our rear.

Later, in October 1862, the regiment drew new uniforms upon their return to Knoxville, Tennessee, after the disastrous Kentucky Campaign. Matthews describes: "woolen gray jeans, jacket lined with white cotton sheathing with four C.S.A. brass buttons, a pair of unlined gray jeans pants, a while cotton sheeting shirt and drawers, and white cotton machine-knit [word unintelligible] socks and pair of rough tan brogans, hand-made wooden peg shoes ... Most, or all of us, had been using finger-knit woolen socks, which were sent to us from home."

By 1863, with clothing supplies harder to come by, men from the regiment were dressing in "home-woven gray blue, brown or black woolen jeans pants or overcoats ... homemade lamb's wool or beaver or coonskin fur hats ... gray or black hats ... the majority of us wore wool socks sent us from home, while others wore the entire regulation gray uniform including gray caps." Matthews reports that "there were a class of men among us who would rob the dead ... [Other] men who did not entertain the thought of taking the shoes off the dead themselves, but who were in need of shoes and did not know where they could get any, would pay from $10 to $25 for a pair of second-hand shoes to the man who said, usually, that he had bought them and that they did not fit." Some became so desperate by 1863 that they resorted to scrounging old shoes from abandoned campsites that had been exposed to the elements for six months or more. These were initially soaked in water and then worn; some men had to wear two completely different sized shoes, one for each foot.

=== Weapons and equipment ===
Private Matthews describes the first rifles issued to the regiment:

We drew old painted muskets that had been flint and steel lock guns, which had been worked over by inserting a cylinder with a tube in it on the right side of the barrel at the touch hole, so as to be fired by a hammer coming down on a percussion cap placed over the end of [the] tube. They were smooth bores, and carried about a half inch round ball with three buck shot on the end of the cartridge and in front of the ball, called buck-and-ball cartridges.

These rifles were later replaced by Enfields, which were in turn subsequently discarded for captured Federal Springfield rifles, which were seen as more dependable. Writing about knapsacks, canteens and other gear issued during their initial deployment to Ft. McRee, Matthews described:

An oilcloth haversack suspended by a leather strap over our right shoulder, and hanging loose at our left side. An oilcloth knapsack on our shoulders and back; a quart cedar canteen to carry water in, bound with two brass hoops, tin neck or mouth, the cork stopper attached by a small iron chain and swinging on an inch and a half canvas strap over our right shoulder and hanging loose at our left side ... We never drew blankets from the government; these we carried from home, which were usually white bed blankets, though some were homemade, served us until we afterwards obtained U.S. blankets on the battlefield.

Other equipment later assigned to the regiment included: "wall tents with a fly for each, a two-mule covered ambulance with team, other two-mule teams and white canvas-covered wagons to carry our tents, cooking utensils, axes, picks, spades and other such things." The regiment lost its wall tents at Wartrace, Tennessee, in April 1863; thereafter, the men made do with captured Federal shelter halves, three of which were often combined to form a usable shelter.

By the winter of 1863–64, supply shortages in the South had become acute: new recruits were arriving each month from Alabama without much more than the civilian clothes they were wearing, a "Confederate tin canteen and white cotton cloth haversack, [and a] home-woven wool blanket or cotton bed quilt." These soldiers were quick to exchange those things for "a Yankee U.S. blanket, an oilcloth haversack and cloth-covered canteen," usually by removing them from the battlefield.

=== Rations ===
Rations issued to the men of the 33rd varied, depending on the time and location. Speaking of the regiment's fare during their early days at Ft. McRee, Matthews writes:

Each mess [a group of soldiers designated to eat together] drew rations in a lump, crackers were divided by count. Acting Quartermaster Sergeant Joseph A. Snellings [had] a tin cup in which he measured or divided the flour, meal or rice to the messes after the company rations had been issued to it, and a small pair of draw scales with which he measured our meat rations. We baked in flat-bottom and usually about fourteen-inch iron skillets or ovens, and bailed in camp kettles: tin cans with wire bails that held about four or five gallons each ... twenty or more of us drew rations, cooked and [ate] together. To each was issued a pound of flour, corn meal, soda, crackers and rice; half a pound of bacon; three-fourths pound of pickled pork or beef or a pound of fresh beef daily; and salt with some coffee and some soap that did not lather in that brackish water ... [He made] deductions in the meat ration when we drew syrup.

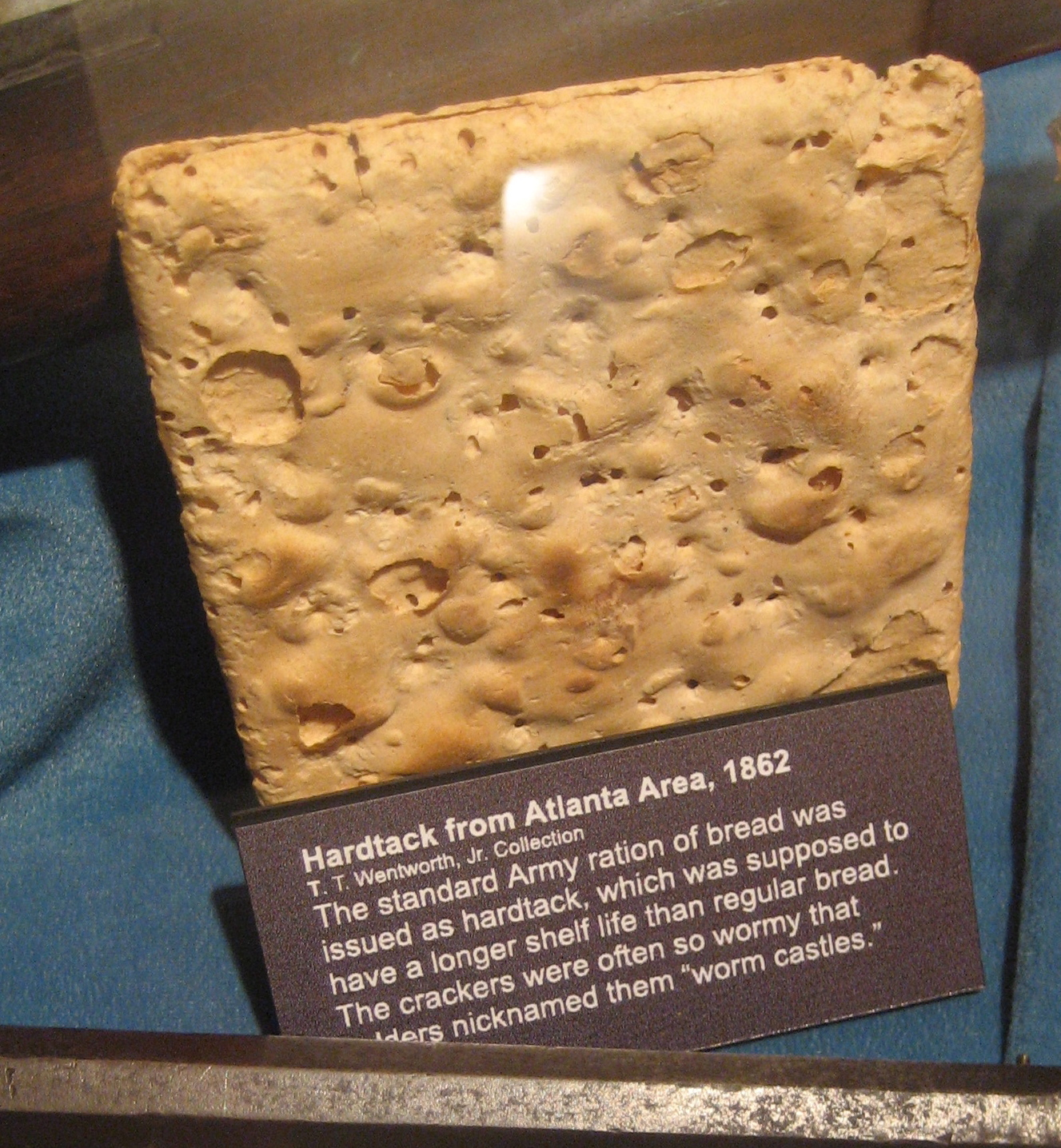
Hardtack from the Civil War

By the time the regiment reached Corinth, Mississippi, in early 1862, the 33rd was keeping "three days cooked rations in our haversacks of flour or cornbread, crackers, rice, pickled pork, fresh or pickled beef, salt, syrup, sweet potatoes, and drew some soap once a week." "Cattle, hogs, sheep or goats," said Matthews, "were either driven or shipped to us on [railroad] cars, and usually butchered on the banks of a creek into which the offal was dumped." He writes of men wrapping fish they had caught in green leaves, then roasting them in the ashes of their campfires, together with sweet potatoes.

In Tullahoma, Tennessee, in early 1863, regimental rations now consisted largely of fresh pork; after the hogs had been butchered, their intestines would be left for any soldiers who wished to make chitterlings out of them. Salt (which Matthews says was carried in "small cloth wallets in our haversacks") and coffee were highly prized, with "ghouls" even taking them from the dead. He also mentions "flour, corn meal, rice, some fresh beef, some sweet and Irish potatoes ... and soap" being issued at this time.

By April 1863, rations consisted of "three-fourths pounds of flour, or corn meal, or rice; meat rations: usually three-fourths pounds grass-fed common beef or a half pound of bacon; and salt, occasionally ..." Soldiers supplemented this through foraging, and while rations were plentiful enough at this point to ignore a dead yearling bull they found on one of their marches, Matthews indicates that "a dead yearling, nor a live one for that matter, would not have remained unskinned long near us a month later." By the start of the Atlanta campaign, the beef issued to the regiment was of such an inferior quality that "some of the boys said they had to walk across their pen twice to make a shadow."

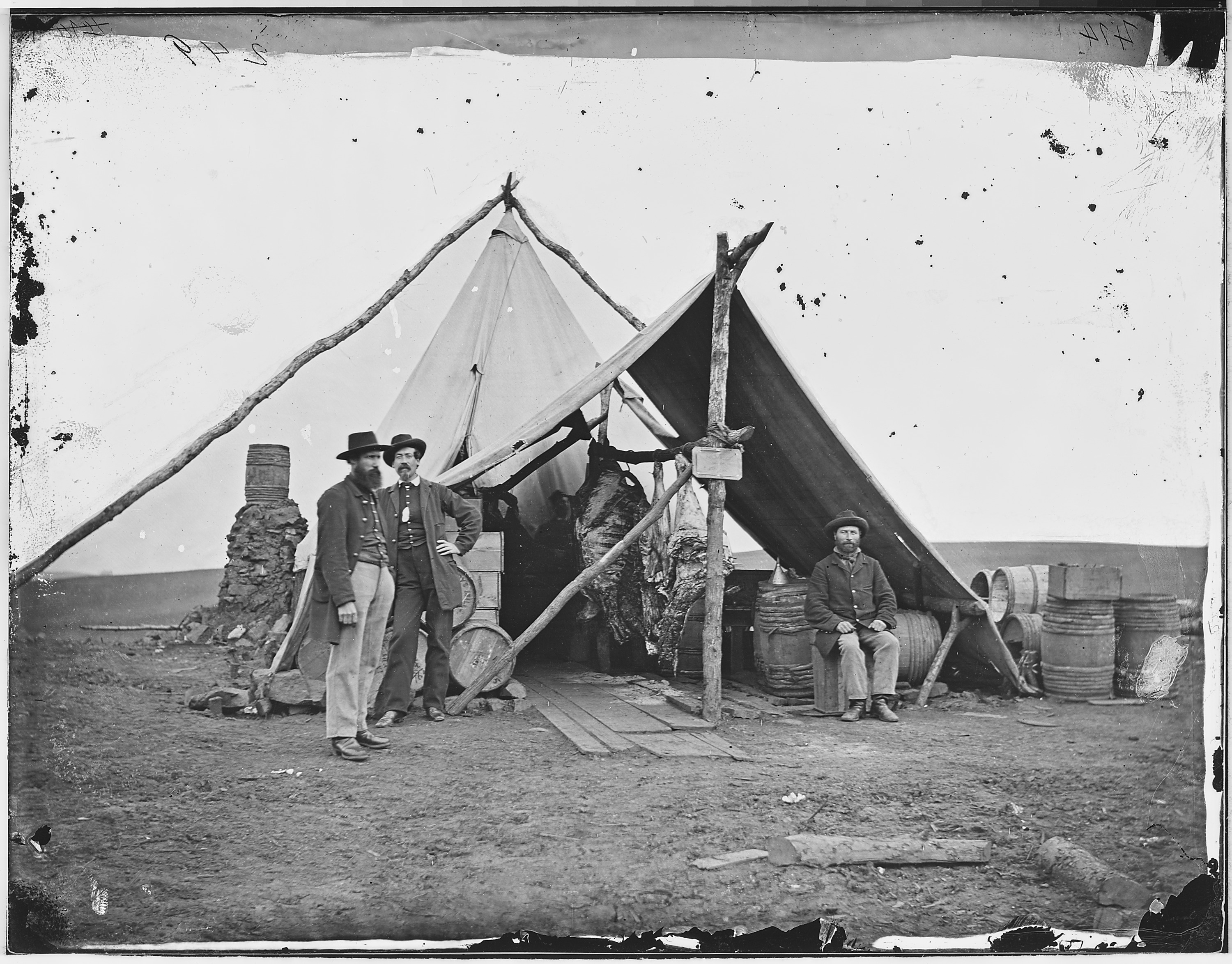
Civil War regimental commissary

While in the field, rations for the 33rd (and other Confederate regiments) were usually cooked at a site located two to five miles in the rear area behind the front lines, where the "regimental skillet wagon" was located. Men were periodically assigned to KP duty here, where they chopped wood, carried water and cooked meals. A regimental teamster was assigned to draw rations daily from the nearest railhead; in May 1864 these consisted of one pound of unbolted corn per man per day, or the same weight of flour made of wheat and cowpeas ground together. In addition, each soldier was allotted a half-pound of bacon, or a pound of fresh beef. When this arrangement proved impractical (such as during combat), uncooked rations were issued, and each soldier was on their own. Unlike modern armies who employ trained cooks, the 33rd made do with troops from the ranks; the quality of their preparations accordingly varied, with Matthews reporting of one cook: "Co. B didn't make [him] any presents."

During their ill-fated Franklin-Nashville Campaign in late 1864 regimental rations had dwindled to near nothing, with troops forced to scavenge sorghum from farms; one Mess Sergeant was even jokingly advised to throw away his scales, since the men believed that no more rations would ever be issued and the man should not have to haul the unnecessary weight. Local farmers had fled the area, leaving their fields unplanted and their stock scattered or dead. While cornbread, biscuits and beef were occasionally issued in minute quantities, persimmons were often the only food the 33rd got to eat on a regular basis. When he was wounded at Franklin, Matthews was transferred to a Confederate hospital at Columbia, Tennessee, where he was fed "beef soup, wheat and corn bread, fresh beef often hashed, pork and bacon, Irish potatoes and onions."

On their final journey from Mississippi to North Carolina in early 1865, the 33rd drew two-days' worth of rations described as: "three-fourths pound of corn meal and a half pound of flour, and three-fourths pound beef and one-third pound of bacon," plus sweet potatoes.

During the final fifteen months of the war, Matthews reports, "we were not accustomed to [having] as much as we could eat, in consequence of which our stomachs became drawn and contracted; and for two years or more after we got home, we could not eat as much as we could before we entered the army."

=== Sundries ===
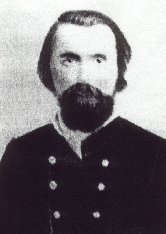
2LT James Moore Fleming, of Company K, 33rd Alabama Infantry, from Elba, Alabama

Various sundries were available at different times to men of the 33rd. At Ft. McRee soldiers could purchase: "a small horn fine-tooth comb, a horn folding pocket comb, a fourth quire of common writing paper, or about twenty-four unstamped envelopes [all of which] cost about twenty-five cents each; and fifty cents for a brass penstaff and steel pen point, or a wood-and-glass inkwell; postage stamps were ten cents each ..." During Christmas of 1862, Matthews writes that matches were at a premium among his friends: "a round wooden box, containing one hundred sulphur matches, and [having] to be quite dry to ignite, [cost] a month's wages at $11.00." Some men carried flint rocks or arrowheads, which they would scrape against their pocketknives to start fires even when it was raining. Other soldiers would gather around "in droves" with twigs, bark and other kindling to ignite and carry back to start their own blazes.

By April 1863, groundpeas retailed at 25 cents per "short tin quart;" stick candy was five cents per stick or $3.50 for a five-pound bundle; coffee was $5 per pound, and corn whiskey sold at varying prices, depending on availability. A local farmer who had received supplies from a Blockade runner might sell it for $1.00 per quart, or twenty-five cents per glass—usually only to those who belonged to a club.

During the Siege of Chattanooga, Matthews says that liver could be bought at 75 cents per pound; a cow's head cost 50 cents to a dollar per pound, while the tongue cost 75 cents to a dollar. A dollar could also buy a short pint of cowpeas, salt or rice. For a short time the regiment had the services of some women who sold a "very small hot biscuit, without yeast or shortening, and with very little salt in them" for a dollar, as well. Two men in the regiment specialized in baking cakes of flour, black sorghum syrup and a little salt, which were sold by sutlers during the regiment's time at Atlanta. These fetched a dollar apiece, or ten for $9.00, or $66.65 per hundred. Purchasers learned not to eat these while marching, as two men who did were later sent to the rear in an ambulance.

=== Discipline ===
Military justice during the U.S. Civil War was often administered with great severity. Members of the 33rd Alabama, like those of other units on both sides, were compelled at different times to witness punishments meted out to convicted offenders; Matthews describes this episode from the regiment's time in Corinth:

Bragg had to have men shot or whipped.^{b} In July we were marched to a field to see two men shot for desertion ... The two [neither of whom were from the 33rd] marched handcuffed together to the place of execution, about a mile and a half west from the depot, were seated upon their rough plank coffins just in front of their open graves and blindfolded. A detail of twenty-four men loaded their guns with eight ball cartridges and sixteen blanks, marched to within ten paces of the prisoners and stacked arms four guns to the stack, then marched away. Another detail of twenty-four men marched up and at the command "halt, front, take arms, right dress, make ready, take aim, fire!" and the men fell off their coffins backwards dead, four minie balls, one inch long by half inch in diameter, through the breast of each one.

Equally draconian was the practice of "drumming a man out of service:"

We marched to the sand field twice to see men whipped and drummed out of service for desertion and marauding; one was tied and whipped leaning against an [artillery] wheel. Infantrymen's hands were tied over a forked post, the left side of their faces and heads had been shaved clean, hats, coats, shirts, shoes and socks removed, pants rolled up to near the knees; and after receiving thirty-nine lashes on their bare backs, [they] took their shoes and socks in one hand, and their shirt, coat and hat in the other and marched between the two lines of us to the tap of a drum; and when they got to the ends of the two lines of men they were made to run, drummed out of service.

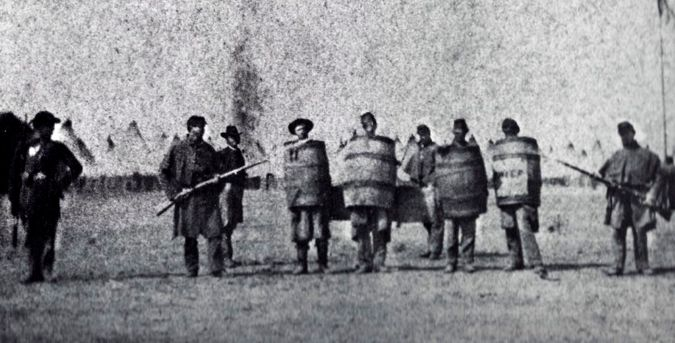
Soldiers wearing the "barrel shirt."

On another occasion, regimental soldiers were called out to witness the executions of two men: one had deserted, and the other was convicted of raping women. On this occasion, however, a last-minute reprieve from the army commander stopped both executions.

Discipline within the 33rd Alabama was lenient, compared to this. Most minor offenses were dealt with initially by a warning; if the conduct persisted, the offender might be given extra "police duty," which would entail sweeping, cleaning his living area, digging or cleaning out latrine or offal pits or similar activities during off-duty hours. The worst punishment usually meted out for all but the most serious of offenses was to be confined to the guard quarters while performing extra duty; however, Matthews indicates that those so confined were often helped in doing their punishment work by comrades who felt sorry for them. The worst punishments inflicted on anyone in the 33rd were "bucking and gagging,"^{f} the wearing of a "barrel shirt,"^{f} or carrying a rail while marching. According to Matthews, this was done to just one man—and that by the army's provost marshal, not any regimental authority.

=== Sanitation ===
Field hygiene and sanitation are extremely important in the prevention of disease, which was responsible for two-thirds of the deaths suffered during the Civil War. Private Matthews describes some of the sanitary measures taken during the 33rd's time in Tupelo:

Pickled beef and pork and other food was dumped into the offal pits: deep holes which the company dug, into which we put all slops and waste foods, and covered with a little earth each morning by details of men, who also cleaned our camp clear of all litter and garbage, burning it each day. Each company also a deep open toilet pit with a pole on each side, into which some earth was also thrown each morning.

Matthews reports that when a member of Company B accidentally dropped his pocketwatch into the latrine pit one morning, he paid a black cook $5.00 to get it out. Men from the regiment stripped and washed their socks, underwear and shirts in a creek without using soap or boiling water; then they put on dry socks, pants, coats and shoes while waiting for their wet clothes to dry in the sun—unless they were ordered to move out, in which case they simply put on their sopping clothes and let them dry on their bodies. Men tried to bathe their feet at least once every twenty-four hours, striving to always keep a pair of dry socks to keep their feet from becoming "sore." Half-ripe walnuts and fruit were forbidden for sanitary reasons, and soldiers caught eating them were punished by being forced to dig latrine pits.

=== Mail and packages ===
Often food and clothing would be sent to the regiment from families back home, in care of a soldier returning from furlough. Private Matthews writes that such a man would have to remain with them on the boxcars even after his leave had expired, to prevent them from being stolen. One such man was AWOL for two weeks while keeping an eye on some boxes shipped by families of soldiers from Eufaula, but when he was finally able to obtain transportation for himself and his cargo to the regiment, he was absolved of all charges and nothing further was said.

=== Regimental nicknames ===
Giving nicknames to soldiers has long been a feature of military life. Private David McCook of Company B was referred to as the "Skillet Wagon" by men of other companies, because they were always borrowing his tin pans, buckets or cans for cooking. Private Matthews was called "Marker", while others sported such monikers as "Burnt Tail Coat", "Fatty Bread", "Mumps", "Lousy Jim", "Cakes", "Keno", "Strap" and "Sharp." Matthews further reports that one evening as the regiment was being inspected by its commander, Colonel Adams called a twenty-year-old recruit to attention, referring to him "by a name that he would not have given a married man"; he writes that this name stuck with that man afterward, and was used by the regimental surgeon to warn malingerers away from sick call.

=== Roll of Honor ===
Ten soldiers of the 33rd Alabama were inscribed into the Confederate Roll of Honor during the civil war, all for the Battle of Chickamauga:

- CPL Bell, Alexander R., Company "H";
- 3SG Bush, Richard R., Company "G"; (KIA)
- CPT Dodson, W.E., Company "C";
- CPT Hammett, B.F., Company "B";
- PVT Harris, William, Company "K";
- PVT Hatten, W.E., Company "I";
- PVT Lewis, P.S.H., Company "E"; (KIA)
- PVT Mock, W.R., Company "A";
- PVT Perry, J.D., Company "C";
- SGT Sessions, C.L., Company "D". (KIA)

== The 33rd Alabama in art ==
The 33rd Alabama Infantry has been featured in Civil War art. Some examples include:

- Pat Cleburne's Men, by Don Troiani;
- Cleburne, by David Wright;
- 33rd Alabama Regiment, 1863, by Rodney Ramsey.

== Re-enactment groups ==
33rd Alabama Infantry – Modern re-enactment group.

== See also ==
- List of Confederate units from Alabama
- 15th Regiment Alabama Infantry – Another Confederate regiment recruited earlier in the war from this same area; it went on to fame during the Battle of Gettysburg as the regiment that charged the 20th Maine on Little Round Top.

== Footnotes ==
- ^ Note a: Although one source gives this soldier's name as "Marvin L. Wheeler", of Co. A, the Alabama Department of Archives and History lists the author's name as "W.E. Matthews" or "W.E. Matthews Preston," while the National Park Service lists it as "W.E. Preston." Another document indicates that he was "William E. Matthews" during the war, but later changed his name to "Preston." See Dale County Military Archives.
- ^ Note b: Matthew's low opinion of Bragg was shared by another private in the Army of Tennessee, Sam Watkins (of the 1st Tennessee Infantry), who wrote the famous memoir Company Aytch. See Chapter III, "Corinth," where he describes in detail the contempt he had for Bragg—an opinion shared by most of Bragg's senior officers—see also Chapter IV, "Tupelo," Chapter VII, "Shelbyville," and especially Chapter XI, "Dalton," in which he compares Bragg to his eventual replacement, General Joseph E. Johnston, insisting that in his opinion, the latter was just in his punishments, while the former was not.
- ^ Note c: Apparently unbeknownst to Matthews, General Wood had been wounded in the head during the battle; see Eicher, John H., and David J. Eicher, Civil War High Commands, Stanford University Press, 2001, ISBN 978-0-8047-3641-1, pg. 579. Wood would recover and return to command; he survived the war and served as an Alabama state legislator, attorney and professor of law at the University of Alabama before dying in 1891.
- ^ Note d: According to Private Matthews (pg. 13 of his manuscript), several soldiers of the 33rd were absent from the unit during the Battle of Perryville; many of these rejoined the regiment from Confederate military hospitals further south, after the retreat to Tennessee.
- ^ Note e: A common practice among slave-holding soldiers in the Confederate Army (especially early in the war) was to take a slave they considered especially loyal with them to the Army; these men were referred to as "body servants". While their duties were usually much less onerous than the slaves left behind at home, these men were still legally their masters' property.
- ^ Note f: "Bucking and gagging" refers to the practice of sitting a soldier on the ground, gagging him, then tying his arms and legs together, knees between his arms and a rod or stick inserted over his elbows and under his knees. A "barrel shirt" refers to a barrel that had holes for the soldier's arms, which he wore to indicate that he had committed some offense.
- ^ Note g: Lieutenant Moore was the regimental adjutant, and the author of the letter cited earlier in this article describing the Battle of Stones River (see note 97). Of him, Matthews indicates that "it was not supposed that Adjutant Moore had an enemy in the regiment, he not having trouble with anyone; furthermore, he was probably the best liked of all our regimental officers." (page 20) Apparently Moore's death was treated as an accident, though its perpetrator was "scolded ... with an exhibition of feeling that was quite plain." (page 20)
- ^ Note h: A series of five maps depicting the action in the Winfrey Field and nearby woods from 6:00 pm to 7:00 pm may be viewed here Civil War Virtual Tours Chickamauga September 19th Winfrey Field 6:00 PM. (Click on the "next" tab or the right arrow to advance to the next map in the sequence). A modern photo of the field is here Civil War Virtual Tours Chickamauga Winfrey Field, and a short video here Winfrey Field at Chickamauga - YouTube.
- ^ Note i: Six members of the 104th Ohio would win the Congressional Medal of Honor at Franklin, all for capturing enemy flags. Flags were very important during the Civil War, not just because they helped one find one's own regiment in the confusion of combat, but also in part because they symbolized the honor, history and prowess of the regiment to which they belonged. See Why Were Flags Enormously Important in the Civil War? for further explanation.
- ^ Note j: Eleven months before his death, General Cleburne had made an astonishing proposal to the Confederate government: he advocated that the South free all of its slaves, then arm and train the males as soldiers to fight alongside whites for a truly free Confederacy. Although it seems to have stemmed more from military necessity than from any moral opposition to slavery (though he refers to it as a "continued embarrassment" and an "insidious weakness"), his proposal details the various reasons given by other Southerners for wanting to preserve the institution. Cleburne's letter was scorned by his associates and suppressed by Jefferson Davis; some historians believe it cost him any chance for a future promotion. For the text of this extraordinary letter, see Patrick Cleburne's Proposal to Arm Slaves. Cleburne's idea forms the theme of the 2008 graphic novel Cleburne, by Justin Murphy.

== Bibliography ==
- Armstrong, Charles Jacob: Diary of Sergeant Charles Jacob Armstrong, Co. C, 33rd Alabama Infantry. – Unpublished manuscript, held by Alabama Department of Archives and History, Montgomery, AL.
- Bailey, Ronald H., and the Editors of Time-Life Books. Battles for Atlanta: Sherman Moves East. – Time-Life Books, 1985. ISBN 978-0-8094-4773-2.
- Brewer, Willis: Alabama: Her History, Resources, War Record, and Public Men: From 1540 to 1872. – Barrett and Brown, 1872. OCLC 2667343
- Butkovich, Brad: The Battle of Pickett's Mill: Along the Dead Line. – The History Press, 2013. ISBN 978-1-62619-042-9.
- Cartwright, Thomas Y.: Franklin: The Valley of Death. – Civil War Trust, pub. date unknown.
- Coleman, James C. (1988): Fort McRee, The Castle Built on Sand. – Pensacola Historical Society, Pensacola, FL, 1988. ISBN 978-0-9395-6606-8
- Connelly, Thomas Lawrence: Autumn of Glory: The Army of Tennessee: 1862–65. – Louisiana State University Press, 1971. ISBN 978-0-8071-2738-4.
- Cooling, B. Franklin, PhD: The Decisive Battle of Nashville. – Civil War Trust, publication date unknown.
- Cox, Jabob: The March to the Sea, Franklin and Nashville. – Charles Scribner's Sons, 1913.
- Cozzens, Peter: The Shipwreck of Their Hopes: The Battles for Chattanooga. – University of Illinois Press, 1994. ISBN 978-0-252-01922-7.
- Cozzens, Peter: This Terrible Sound: The Battle of Chickamauga. – University of Illinois Press, 1992. ISBN 978-0-252-02236-4.
- Dunkerly, Robert M.: The Confederate Surrender at Greensboro: The Final Days of the Army of Tennessee. – McFarland Publishers, 2013. ISBN 978-1-4766-0381-0.
- Eicher, David J.: The Longest Night: A Military History of the Civil War. – Simon & Schuster, 2001. ISBN 978-0-684-84944-7.
- Foote, Shelby: The Civil War: A Narrative: Vol. 3, Red River to Appomattox. – Random House, 1974. ISBN 978-0-394-74913-6
- Griffen, John Chandler: A Pictorial History of the Confederacy. – McFarland and Company, 2004. ISBN 978-0-7864-1744-5.
- Hess, Earl J.: Kennesaw Mountain: Sherman, Johnston and the Atlanta Campaign. – University of North Carolina Press, 2013. ISBN 978-1-4696-0211-0.
- Holman, Kurt. Perryville Order of Battle: Forces Present at Perryville, October 8, 1862 (Revised July 1, 2012). – Unpublished paper, Perryville Battlefield State Historic Site.
- Jacobson, Eric A., and Richard A. Rupp: For Cause & for Country: A Study of the Affair at Spring Hill and the Battle of Franklin. – O'More Publishing, 2007. ISBN 978-0-9717444-4-8.
- Joslyn, Mauriel P.: Cleburne: The Defense of Ringgold Gap. – Unpublished paper, 2013.
- Lance III, Joseph M., Major, USMC: Patrick R. Cleburne and the Tactical Employment of His Division at Chickamauga. – Master's Thesis Presented to Command and General Staff College, Ft. Leavenworth, KS, 1996.
- Liddell Hart, B. H. Sherman: Soldier, Realist, American. – Da Capo Press, 1993. ISBN 978-0-306-80507-3
- Matthews, W.E. Preston: Diary and Regimental History of the 33rd Regiment of Alabama Infantry. – Unpublished manuscript, held by Alabama Department of Archives and History, Montgomery, AL.
- McDonough, James: Chattanooga: A Death Grip on the Confederacy. – University of Tennessee Press: 1984. ISBN 978-0-87049-425-3.
- McDonough, James: Nashville: The Western Confederacy's Final Gamble. – University of Tennessee Press, 2004. ISBN 978-1-57233-322-2
- McKay, John E.: Atlanta Campaign. In Encyclopedia of the American Civil War: A Political, Social, and Military History, edited by David S. Heidler and Jeanne T. Heidler. – W. W. Norton & Company, 2000. ISBN 978-0-393-04758-5
- McPherson, James M., ed. Battle Chronicles of the Civil War: 1864. – Grey Castle Press, 1989. ISBN 978-1-55905-024-1
- Noe, Kenneth: The Drought That Changed the War. – Published in the New York Times, October 12, 2012.
- Oake, William Royal: On the Skirmish Line Behind a Friendly Tree. – Farcountry Press, 2006. ISBN 978-1-56037-322-3.
- Sartin, Jeffrey S., MD: Civil War Medicine: The Toll of Bullets and Bacteria. – Adapted from "Infectious Diseases During the Civil War: The Triumph of the Third Army," in Clinical Infectious Diseases, 16: 580–584.
- Sword, Wiley. The Confederacy's Last Hurrah: Spring Hill, Franklin, and Nashville. – University Press of Kansas, 1993. ISBN 978-0-7006-0650-4.
- Walker, Scott: Hell's Broke Loose in Georgia: Survival in a Civil War Regiment. – University of Georgia Press, 2005. ISBN 978-0-8203-2605-4.
- Watkins, Sam: Company Aytch: A Side Show of the Big Show. – Plume Books, 1999; originally published 1882. ISBN 978-1-101-11929-7.
- Woodworth, Steven E., Ed.: The Chickamauga Campaign. – Southern Illinois University Press, 2010. ISBN 978-0-8093-2980-9.
